= Tom DeLay campaign finance trial =

2005–2014 American legal case

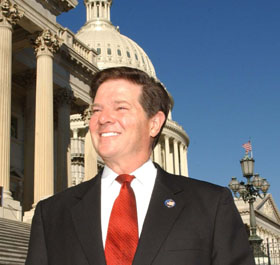
DeLay in 2005.

Tom DeLay, a Republican U.S. Representative from Texas from 1979–83, and from 1985–2006 and the House Majority Leader from 2003–05, was convicted in 2010 of money laundering and conspiracy charges related to illegal campaign finance activities aimed at helping Republican candidates for Texas state office in the 2002 elections. In 2013, a Texas Court of Appeals panel acquitted DeLay when it overturned his conviction. This decision was affirmed by the Texas Court of Criminal Appeals on October 1, 2014. DeLay had three years from that date, i.e. until October 1, 2017, to file any lawsuits for wrongful action.

Ronnie Earle, the Democratic then-District Attorney of Travis County (which includes the state capital of Austin), sought the indictment of Tom DeLay in 2005. After a first grand jury declined to indict DeLay, Earle stated that new evidence had become available. A second grand jury quickly issued an indictment of Delay for one count of criminal conspiracy on September 28, 2005. On October 3, a third grand jury indicted DeLay for the more serious offense of money laundering.

An arrest warrant was issued on October 19, and DeLay turned himself in the next day to the Harris County Sheriff's Office in Houston. In accordance with House Republican Conference rules, DeLay temporarily resigned from his position as House Majority Leader. On January 7, 2006, after pressure from fellow Republicans, he announced that he would not seek to return to the post. On June 9, 2006, DeLay resigned from Congress.

After two judges were recused from the case, the chief justice of the Texas Supreme Court assigned Senior District Judge Pat Priest, a Democrat, of San Antonio to preside over the case. DeLay moved to dismiss all charges. Judge Priest dismissed one count of the indictment alleging conspiracy to violate election law but allowed the other, more serious charges of money laundering and conspiracy to engage in money laundering to proceed. In November 2010, DeLay was found guilty by a Travis County jury on both counts. In September 2013, a Texas appeals court, composed of two Republicans and a dissenting Democrat, overturned DeLay's conviction. In the opinion of the court, the state's evidence was legally insufficient to sustain DeLay's convictions so the court reversed the judgments of the trial court and rendered judgments of acquittal. The current DA's office said it would appeal the decision to the Texas Court of Criminal Appeals, which it later did. The all-Republican Texas Court of Criminal Appeals agreed to review the case and handed down an 8–1 decision affirming the lower courts' dismissal October 1, 2014.

== Background ==
In the reapportionment following the 1990 Census, Texas Democrats drew what Republican political analyst Michael Barone argued was the most effective partisan gerrymander in the country. The Democrats won 70 percent of the Texas congressional seats in 1992, the first year in which the new districts were in effect, while taking half of the total number of votes cast for Congress statewide. After the 2000 census, Republicans sought to redraw the district lines to support a Republican majority in the congressional delegation while Democrats desired to retain a plan similar to the existing lines. The two parties reached an impasse in the Texas Legislature, where Republicans controlled the Senate and Democrats controlled the House. As a result the new district lines were drawn by a three judge federal court panel that made as few changes as possible while adding the two new seats.

In 2001 the Texas Legislative Redistricting Board (a panel composed of the state's Lieutenant Governor, Comptroller of Public Accounts, Speaker of the state House, Attorney General, and Land Commissioner) redrew state legislative districts in accordance with the Census results. The new map that was adopted by the Republican-dominated board gave the Republicans an edge in winning the Texas House of Representatives, still controlled at that time by the Democrats. During the 2002 elections under these new maps, DeLay aggressively raised money for Republican candidates under Texans for a Republican Majority (TRMPAC). In October 2002, TRMPAC made contributions, through several channels, to Nelson Balido of San Antonio ($2,000), Byron Cook of Corsicana ($2,000), Wayne Christian of Center ($2,000), Rick Green of Dripping Springs ($2,000), and Eddie Shauberger of Liberty ($2,000), among others.

The GOP victories in 2002 resulted in their control of the Texas House in addition to the Senate. As a result, the Texas Legislature was called into session in 2003 to establish a controversial mid-decade redistricting plan that favored Republicans. A number of Democrats (the "Killer Ds", in the state House, and "Texas Eleven" in the state Senate) left the state and went to Oklahoma and later New Mexico to deny a quorum for voting. Helen Giddings, the recognized negotiator, was arrested in May 2003, but later the arrest was called a mistake. The political police dragnet was at taxpayer expense. Texas House Speaker Craddick apologized to Giddings, then ordered the Sergeant at Arms to incarcerate Giddings in the state capital building.

On May 26, 2005, a Texas judge ruled that a committee formed by DeLay had violated state law by not disclosing over $600,000 worth of fundraising money, mostly from the credit card industry, including $25,000 from Sears, Roebuck & Co., and $50,000 from Diversified Collections Services of San Leandro.

Some of the money was spent on manning phone banks and posting wanted posters on Federal Highways calling for the arrest of Democratic legislators with an 800 number to the Texas Department of Public Safety to call if seen after the Democratic caucus left for Oklahoma in order to prevent the redistricting legislation from passing. The Federal Highway Administration offered to cooperate in arresting the Democrats, forcing the Democrats to travel to Oklahoma by plane instead of by automobile. Five Texas congressional seats changed hands from Democrats to Republicans during the 2004 election, largely due to the new redistricting. On October 6, 2004, the House Ethics Committee unanimously admonished DeLay on two counts. The first count stated that DeLay "created the appearance that donors were being provided with special access to Representative DeLay regarding the then-pending energy legislation." The second count alleged DeLay had "used federal resources in a political issue" by asking the Federal Aviation Administration and Justice Department to help track Texas legislators during the battle over Texas redistricting. At the time of the latter admonishment, the House Ethics committee deferred action on another count related to fundraising while that matter was subject to state criminal action. That state investigation eventually led to the felony indictment on September 28, 2005.

In 2005, the Federal Election Commission audited DeLay's national political action committee, Americans for a Republican Majority (ARMPAC). The FEC found that ARMPAC had failed to report $322,306 in debts owed to vendors, and that it had incorrectly paid for some committee expenses using funds from an account designated for non-federal elections. The FEC also found that ARMPAC had misstated the balances of its receipts and ending cash-on-hand for 2001, and of its receipts, disbursements, and beginning and ending cash-on-hand for 2002. ARMPAC corrected the omission of the debts in amended reports, and is reviewing the portion of the audit dealing with incorrect payment for expenses.

DeLay asserted that Earle was "a rogue district attorney" engaged in "blatant political partisanship". Earle retired in December 2007 and was succeeded by Rosemary Lehmberg, whom he mentored.

== Grand jury indictments ==
- September 8, 2005: A federal grand jury indicted TRMPAC, which allegedly accepted an illegal political contribution of $100,000 from the Alliance for Quality Nursing Home Care and the Texas Association of Business, on four charges, including unlawful political advertising, unlawful contributions to a political committee and unlawful expenditures such as those to a graphics company and political candidates.
- September 28, 2005: A Travis County grand jury operating under Travis County District Attorney Ronnie Earle indicted DeLay for conspiring to violate Texas state election law stemming from issues dealing with his involvement in TRMPAC. Texas law prohibits corporate contributions in state legislative races. The indictment charged that TRMPAC accepted corporate contributions, laundered the money through the Republican National Committee, and directed it to favored Republican candidates in Texas.
- September 30, 2005: In response to a motion to dismiss his initial indictment, Earle sought a second indictment of DeLay from a second grand jury. That jury refused to indict. Contrary to normal Texas procedure, a "no bill" document was not publicly released, and no public announcement was made regarding the result until after Earle had presented evidence to a third grand jury and obtained an indictment.
- October 3, 2005: Earle sought and received a new indictment of DeLay from a third grand jury in Austin on charges of conspiracy and money laundering. The next day, in a written statement, Earle publicly admitted he had presented the case to three grand juries, and that two of the three had refused to indict. Earle claimed he had presented the new money-laundering charge to another grand jury because the previous grand jury had expired. DeLay's lawyers noted that Earle should not have waited to make the statement until after 5 p.m. that day.
- October 3, 2005: DeLay's lawyers filed a motion to throw out the charge of conspiracy to violate election law as fraudulent, claiming it was a violation of the U.S. Constitution's ban on ex-post facto applications of law. DeLay's lawyers argued that, in 2002, the crime of conspiracy did not apply to Texas election law. However, George Dix, a law professor at the University of Texas at Austin, stated that charges of criminal conspiracy could legally be applied to any felony (including violation of election law) committed prior to the 2003 law. He characterized the 2003 change cited by DeLay's lawyers as a clarification of existing law, saying, "It isn't unheard of — the Legislature passing a law to make clear what the law is." As the Texas Penal Code defines laundered money only as money gained as the "proceeds of criminal activity", DeLay's lawyers maintained that misuse of corporate donations, even if it occurred, could not constitute money laundering.
- October 7, 2005: DeLay's attorneys filed a motion in court to have the latest indictment thrown out, charging that Earle coerced the grand jury and illegally discussed grand jury information and encouraged others to do the same.
- October 19, 2005: A Texas court issued a warrant for DeLay's arrest. DeLay surrendered at the Harris County, Texas jail the next day. He was booked, photographed, and fingerprinted, before posting $10,000 bond.
- October 21, 2005: DeLay appeared in court.
- November 1, 2005: DeLay prevailed in a motion to remove assigned Travis County judge Bob Perkins from the case. Perkins had donated to Democratic candidates and organizations, including MoveOn.org. DeLay's attorneys argued Perkins could not be perceived as impartial under the circumstances. The motion was heard by retired judge C.W. Duncan. Duncan ordered Perkins' removal from the case. DeLay also sought to have the venue changed from Democratic-leaning Travis County, which was later denied.
- November 3, 2005: Pat Priest, a "semi-retired" judge and a Democrat, was selected to preside over the case.
- November 22, 2005: DeLay filed a motion to dismiss the charges against him.
- December 5, 2005: Judge Priest dismissed one count, conspiracy to violate election law, but let stand two counts alleging money laundering and conspiracy to commit money laundering, of which DeLay was later convicted on November 24, 2010.
- April 19, 2006: The Texas Third Court of Appeals upheld the decision to dismiss the charge of conspiracy to violate election law.
- September 19, 2013: DeLay's November 2010 convictions were overturned by the Texas 3rd Court of Appeals, which noted in part that "the jury on two occasions had asked trial Judge Pat Priest whether the $190,000 was 'illegal at the start of the transaction' or 'procured by illegal means originally'" and that "the judge never answered the jurors' questions".
- October 1, 2014: The Texas Court of Criminal Appeals ruled 8-1 to uphold the decisions of the lower courts, exonerating DeLay.

=== Indictments of associates ===
On September 13, 2005, a federal grand jury indicted ARMPAC's executive director Jim Ellis and TRMPAC's former executive director John Colyandro, who already faced charges of money laundering in the case, as well as 13 counts of unlawful acceptance of a corporate political contribution. The charges were brought before the grand jury by Earle. Joe Turner, who represented Colyandro, stated he did not want a jury trial in Austin, because "DeLay and Republicans are hated [there]". The indictment charged that DeLay, Colyandro and Ellis conspired to pass corporate contributions to candidates for the Texas legislature in violation of Texas campaign finance law. Several corporations (such as Diversified Collection Services and Sears Roebuck) allegedly made contributions to TRMPAC. The indictment charged that TRMPAC then sent a check for $190,000 to the Republican National Committee, made payable to "RNSEC" (the Republican National State Elections Committee), along with a list of state-level Republican candidates who should receive the money. According to the indictment, the Republican candidates in Texas did receive the money so designated.

A Travis County grand jury issued the indictment. The third grand jury's foreman, William Gibson, stated that there were "stacks and stacks" [of evidence] and that "[A]s far as we're concerned, they presented us enough evidence and witnesses that we felt we were on the right track. I would not have put my name on that grand-jury indictment unless I felt we had ample probable cause." Gibson, however, later reportedly told KLBJ Radio in an interview that his decision to indict DeLay was based on news stories that the Texas Association of Business mailings against candidate James Spencer, a personal friend of Gibson, were coordinated with TRMPAC.

Earle's investigation of DeLay was the subject of a documentary, The Big Buy: Tom DeLay's Stolen Congress. The filmmakers went to cover the 2003 Texas redistricting battle but eventually focused primarily on the grand jury investigation. Earle cooperated with the documentarians, but DeLay refused to meet with them.

=== DeLay's response to the indictments ===
DeLay blasted the charges as a "sham" and an act of "political retribution", perpetuated by his political opponents. He added, "I have done nothing wrong, I have violated no law, no regulation, no rule of the House." He retained former U.S. Representative Edwin Bethune of Arkansas, a Washington, D.C., lawyer and lobbyist, who had earlier represented Gingrich during his ethics cases. DeLay and his attorney, Dick DeGuerin, claimed Earle has a history of indicting political enemies. Due to Republican party rules regarding leadership and indictments, DeLay stepped down from his position as House Majority Leader. Serving his last day on June 9, 2006, he stepped down, "to pursue new opportunities to engage in the important cultural and political battles of our day from an arena outside of the U.S. House of Representatives."

White House spokesman Scott McClellan commented by saying that President Bush still viewed DeLay as "a good ally, a leader who we have worked closely with to get things done for the American people." On January 7, 2006, DeLay announced he would not seek to return to his position as Majority Leader. His lawyers asserted there were various legal insufficiencies regarding the indictments. On October 3, 2005, DeLay's lawyers filed a motion to get the indictment of conspiracy to violate election law thrown out as fraudulent, claiming it was a violation of the U.S. Constitution's ban on ex-post facto applications of law. DeLay's lawyers claimed that, in 2002, the crime of conspiracy did not apply to Texas election law, and maintained the corporate donations came from normal and legal business activity.

== Verdict and appeals ==
On November 24, 2010, DeLay was found guilty by a Travis County jury on both counts. The range of possible sentences was probation to between 5 and 99 years in prison and up to $20,000 in fines. On January 10, 2011, after a sentencing hearing, Judge Priest sentenced DeLay to three years in prison on the charge of conspiring to launder corporate money into political donations. On the charge of money laundering, DeLay was sentenced to five years in prison, which was probated for 10 years, meaning DeLay would have had to serve 10 years' probation. Dick DeGuerin, DeLay's defense attorney, appealed his conviction to the Texas Court of Criminal Appeals, which heard oral arguments on October 10, 2012.

On September 19, 2013, two Republican judges on a Texas appeals court overturned Delay's convictions, 2-1, ruling the evidence was legally insufficient to sustain his convictions. The Travis County District Attorney's office issued a statement that it would appeal the decision before the Texas Court of Criminal Appeals, which it did. The all-Republican Texas Court of Criminal Appeals agreed to review the case and ruled, 8-1, to affirm the lower courts' dismissal on October 1, 2014.
