= Robert Perkins =

Robert Perkins may refer to:

- Robert Perkins (actor) (born 1966), British actor in the television series The Bill
- Robert Perkins (architect), American architect
- Robert Perkins (artist) (born 1949), American artist, filmmaker and writer
- Robert Perkins (MP), British Conservative MP for Stroud
- Robert Perkins, co-producer of the Ricky Martin song "It's Alright"
- Robert Irvin Perkins (1898–1992), politician in Saskatchewan, Canada
- Robert Cyril Layton Perkins (1866–1955), British entomologist
- Robert D. Perkins Sr. (1922–1994), American educator, businessman and civil rights activist
- Bob Perkins (judge), American judge
- Bob Perkins (radio personality) (1933–2025), American radio personality
- Robert L. Perkins, American philosopher
- Robbie Perkins (born 1994), Australian baseball player
