= Bob Perkins (judge) =

American judge

Bob Perkins is an American judge who sits on Travis County District Court in Austin, Texas. In November 2005, he was assigned to preside over the Tom DeLay money-laundering case. DeLay's attorneys objected, arguing that Perkins was a member of the Democratic Party, and had contributed to the liberal group MoveOn.org which DeLay's lawyers alleged sold anti-DeLay T-shirts, which MoveOn.org denied.

Perkins denied ever seeing the alleged T-shirts but confirmed he had contributed to the failed campaign of Democratic presidential nominee John Kerry. Travis County District Attorney Ronnie Earle attempted to keep Perkins as the presiding judge over the prosecution of DeLay, whose lawyers were successful in arguing the judge could not be perceived in public as impartial under the circumstances of Perkins' donations.

Earle's office argued there was no reason to replace Perkins as judges should automatically be viewed as impartial. Perkins had once voluntarily recused himself in Earle's earlier failed prosecution of Republican U.S. Senator Kay Bailey Hutchison. The motion was heard by retired judge C.W. Duncan.

Duncan ordered Perkins' removal from the case, and judge Pat Priest (also a Democrat) was selected by Texas Supreme Court Chief Justice Wallace Jefferson (a Republican) to preside over the case. DeLay was later exonerated by an appeals court of all charges.
