= John Colyandro =

John Dominick Colyandro is a former Senior Advisor and Policy Director for Texas Governor Greg Abbott. He is a former executive director of the Texas Conservative Coalition and the Texas Conservative Coalition Research Institute. He is also the former executive director of the political action committee Texans for a Republican Majority.

He was indicted for money laundering and unlawful acceptance of corporate contributions in 2004. He pleaded guilty to illegal acceptance of political contributions in 2012.

== Early years ==
Colyandro graduated from Westfield High School in Houston in 1982. In 1983, while attending the University of Texas at Austin, he founded the Texas Review Society and the Texas Review, a conservative political newspaper, which was the antecedent to the Austin Review, Texas Education Review, and Houston Review. Later in the 1980s, he wrote direct mail pieces for Karl Rove. When Colyandro was hired as executive director of TRMPAC, he was described as a "longtime pal of Rove['s]."

In 1985, Colyandro founded the Texas Conservative Coalition to shape public policy through the promotion of limited government, free enterprise, individual liberties, and traditional values. Today, the TCC is widely recognized as one of the largest and most influential caucuses in the Texas Legislature.

== Tom DeLay scandal ==
In 2001, Colyandro was selected by Jim Ellis and Tom DeLay (R-Texas) to be executive director of TRMPAC. Three years later, in 2004, Colyandro was indicted for accepting illegal corporate donations and for illegally laundering $190,000 in corporate funds through the Republican National State Elections Committee; money that later wound up in the hands of Texas Republican candidates. He was indicted on September 28, 2005, along with then-House Majority Leader DeLay and Jim Ellis, who ran DeLay's political action committee Americans for a Republican Majority (ARMPAC).

Colyandro, who "already faced charges of money laundering in the case, also faces 13 counts of unlawful acceptance of a corporate political contribution," and Ellis were indicted September 13, 2005, "on additional felony charges of violating Texas election law and criminal conspiracy to violate election law for their role in the 2002 legislative races." "The money laundering charges stem from $190,000 in corporate funds that were sent to the Republican National Committee, "which then spent the same amount on seven candidates for the Texas Legislature."

In November 2012, Colyandro pleaded guilty to lesser charges of accepting illegal political contributions during the 2002 state legislative elections. He received a one-year deferred adjudication on two Class A misdemeanor charges. There will be no final conviction on his record if he successfully completes unsupervised probation. He also was fined $8,000.

== Recent activities ==
In 2014, Colyandro advised then Texas Attorney General, now Governor, Greg Abbott on his policy positions and agenda. In September 2017 Abbott appointed him as a Senior Advisor and Policy Director within the Office of the Governor.

== See also ==
- Republican Party of Texas
- Texas politics
