= Pat Priest =

Pat Priest may refer to:

- Pat Priest (actress) (born 1936), American actress
- Pat Priest (judge) (1940–2018), Texas state court judge
