= 2002 Texas House of Representatives election =

- November 5, 2002

All 150 seats in the Texas House of Representatives 76 seats needed for a majority
	Majority party	Minority party
Leader	Tom Craddick	Pete Laney
Party	Republican	Democratic
Leader since	January 9, 1973	January 12, 1993
Leader's seat	82nd	85th
Last election	72	78
Seats won	88	62
Seat change	▲16	▼16
Popular vote	2,338,133	1,553,606
Percentage	58.98%	39.19%
Swing	▲2.28%	▼1.84%
- Republican hold Republican gain Democratic hold Democratic gain Republican: 50–60% 60–70% 70–80% 80–90% ≥90% Democratic: 40–50% 50–60% 60–70% 70–80% 80–90% ≥90%
Speaker before election
Pete Laney
Democratic
Elected Speaker
Tom Craddick
Republican

The 2002 Texas House of Representatives elections took place as part of the biennial United States elections. Texas voters elected state representatives in all 150 State House of Representatives districts. The winners of this election served in the 78th Texas Legislature, with seats apportioned according to the 2000 United States census. State representatives serve for two-year terms. Republicans gained control of the House with 88 seats to the Democrats' 62, giving them a governmental trifecta for the first time since Reconstruction.

== Background ==
Democrats had held control of the Texas House of Representatives since Reconstruction despite Republicans winning the governorship in 1994 and the Texas Senate in 1996. In the 2000 elections, Democrats had heavily emphasized the need to maintain control of the chamber to combat a potential Republican gerrymander after the next census. Their heavy investments in key races allowed them to maintain control of the chamber despite governor George W. Bush's victory in the state in the concurrent presidential election.

=== Redistricting ===
Following the release of the 2000 census results, the divided Texas Legislature attempted to undergo its decennial redistricting responsibility, but it failed. Many Republicans in the legislature had felt no pressure to redistrict their own lines as control would fall to the Legislative Redistricting Board, which was controlled by Republicans, if they failed to do so. The districts that the board drew were seen as highly favorable to Republicans. Challenges by the Mexican American Legal Defense and Educational Fund and the Department of Justice altered the board's state House districts, while keeping the state Senate map intact. The Board had attempted to draw Democratic Speaker Pete Laney out of his west Texas district, but this had the ripple effect of reducing the Hispanic population in district 74 along the Texas–Mexico border. The Board agreed to revert this change, allowing the map to pass preclearance.

House districts follow the "county line rule," effectively granting individual counties delegations of state house seats based on their population. The census found that Texas had a population of 20,851,820 in 2000, giving each district an "ideal population" of 139,006 people. In 1990, the "ideal population for a district" was 113,006 people. Counties with at least this number of people must fully contain at least one state house district. Counties with sufficient population for two or more districts must be divided into that number of districts. Should a county have sufficient population for one or more district plus a fraction of another, one district from another county may extend into it to represent the remaining population. District delegations for counties with at least one district changed as follows following the 2000 Census:

County	1990 pop.	Seats	Partial	2000 pop.	Seats	Partial	+/– W	+/– P
Bell County	191,073	1	Yes	238,000	1	Yes	Steady	Steady
Bexar County	1,185,394	11	No	1,393,035	10	No	▼1	Steady
Brazoria County	191,707	1	Yes	241,805	1	Yes	Steady	Steady
Brazos County	121,862	1	Yes	152,436	1	Yes	Steady	Steady
Cameron County	260,120	2	Yes	334,884	2	Yes	Steady	Steady
Collin County	264,036	2	Yes	491,272	3	Yes	▲1	Steady
Dallas County	1,852,691	16	No	2,216,808	16	No	Steady	Steady
Denton County	273,644	2	Yes	433,065	3	No	▲1	▼
Ector County	118,934	1	Yes	121,124	0	Yes	▼1	Steady
El Paso County	591,610	5	No	679,568	5	No	Steady	Steady
Fort Bend County	225,421	2	No	354,286	2	Yes	Steady	▲
Galveston County	217,396	2	No	250,178	1	Yes	▼1	▲
Harris County	2,818,101	25	No	3,401,139	25	No	Steady	Steady
Hidalgo County	383,545	3	Yes	569,099	4	No	▲1	▼
Jefferson County	239,389	2	Yes	251,968	1	Yes	▼1	Steady
Lubbock County	222,636	2	No	242,644	1	Yes	▼1	▲
McLennan County	189,123	1	Yes	213,525	1	Yes	Steady	Steady
Montgomery County	182,201	1	Yes	293,779	2	Yes	▲1	Steady
Nueces County	291,145	2	Yes	313,512	2	Yes	Steady	Steady
Smith County	151,309	1	Yes	174,861	1	Yes	Steady	Steady
Tarrant County	1,170,103	10	No	1,449,290	10	No	Steady	Steady
Taylor County	119,655	1	Yes	126,606	0	Yes	▼1	Steady
Travis County	576,407	5	No	811,776	6	No	▲1	Steady
Webb County	133,239	1	Yes	193,124	1	Yes	Steady	Steady
Wichita County	122,378	1	Yes	131,695	0	Yes	▼1	Steady
Williamson County	139,551	1	Yes	250,466	1	Yes	Steady	Steady

As a result of these changes, the following districts drastically moved:

1. District 20 moved from East Texas to Williamson County.
2. District 46 moved from Hays County to Travis County.
3. District 70 moved from West Texas to Collin County.
4. District 80 moved from the Permian Basin to South Texas.
5. District 89 moved from Tarrant County to Collin County.
6. District 99 moved from Dallas County to Tarrant County.
7. District 115 moved from Bexar County to Dallas County.

== Campaign ==
Seeking a more favorable redistricting plan to boost his political standing, U.S. House majority leader Tom DeLay organized the Texans for a Republican Majority PAC (TRMPAC) with the express purpose of ensuring the election of Tom Craddick as Speaker of the Texas House. This not only involved electing a Republican majority, but also electing enough Republicans such that not enough could defect to continue to support Democrat Pete Laney's speakership. TRMPAC intervened in several Republican primaries to support candidates it saw as more conservative and more supportive of Craddick. This led to the defeat of multiple moderate Republicans as well as the victory of conservative incumbents against more moderate challengers. TRMPAC raised over $1 million during the 2002 cycle from a variety of corporate sources. About half of this money was laundered from corporate treasuries. Later, these actions would lead to the indictment of DeLay and several TRMPAC officials.

The Democratic Party sought to maintain its control of the House by building a strong, diverse statewide ticket, including Tony Sanchez for governor and Ron Kirk for U.S. Senator. They saw the election as an opportunity to reverse the state's Republican trend without the popular George W. Bush on the ballot.

== Predictions ==
Source	Ranking	As of
The Cook; Political Report	Likely R (flip)	October 4, 2002

== Results ==
Republicans flipped twenty one Democratic-held seats, while Democrats flipped five Republican-held seats. Several of these flips came through reapportionment and the movement of districts across the state. With a net gain of sixteen seats, Republicans gained control of the House, giving them a governmental trifecta for the first time since Reconstruction.

=== Statewide ===
Summary of the November 5, 2002 Texas House of Representatives election results
Party	Candidates	Votes	%	Seats	+/–
Republican Party	114	2,338,133	58.98%	88	▲16
Democratic Party	103	1,553,606	39.19%	62	▼16
Libertarian Party	32	58,791	1.48%	0	–
Green Party	7	11,079	0.78%	0	–
Independent	1	2,385	0.06%	0	–
Write-in	1	79	0.00%	0	–
Total		3,964,073	100.00%	150	–

Popular vote
Republican	58.98%
Democratic	39.19%
Libertarian	1.48%
Libertarian	0.28%
Independent	0.06%

House seats won
Republican	58.67%
Democratic	41.33%

=== Close races ===
1. District 45, 0.88% (gain)
2. District 56, 2.88% (gain)
3. District 35, 4.66%
4. District 5, 4.74% (gain)
5. District 18, 6.10%
6. District 134, 6.16%
7. District 32, 6.72%
8. District 48, 7.00% (gain)
9. District 34, 7.58%
10. District 137, 9.50%
11. District 32, 9.76%

=== Results by district ===
District	Democratic		Republican		Others		Total		Result
District	Votes	%	Votes	%	Votes	%	Votes	%	Result
District 1	20,627	62.05%	12,615	37.95%	-	-	33,242	100.00%	Democratic hold
District 2	13,384	41.49%	18,872	58.51%	-	-	32,256	100.00%	Republican gain
District 3	21,153	100.00%	-	-	-	-	21,153	100.00%	Democratic hold
District 4	15,058	40.29%	22,313	59.71%	-	-	37,371	100.00%	Republican hold
District 5	18,451	47.63%	20,286	52.37%	-	-	38,737	100.00%	Republican gain
District 6	-	-	27,729	100.00%	-	-	27,729	100.00%	Republican hold
District 7	-	-	26,265	100.00%	-	-	26,265	100.00%	Republican hold
District 8	14,126	44.79%	17,411	55.21%	-	-	31,537	100.00%	Republican gain
District 9	14,651	45.12%	17,823	54.88%	-	-	32,474	100.00%	Republican hold
District 10	-	-	28,072	100.00%	-	-	28,072	100.00%	Republican hold
District 11	21,161	100.00%	-	-	-	-	21,161	100.00%	Democratic hold
District 12	20,053	61.15%	12,740	38.85%	-	-	32,793	100.00%	Democratic hold
District 13	-	-	24,161	100.00%	-	-	24,161	100.00%	Republican hold
District 14	-	-	20,951	87.86%	2,894	12.14%	23,845	100.00%	Republican hold
District 15	-	-	33,108	91.01%	3,270	8.99%	36,378	100.00%	Republican hold
District 16	-	-	24,514	100.00%	-	-	24,514	100.00%	Republican hold
District 17	21,630	56.38%	16,022	41.76%	715	1.86%	38,367	100.00%	Democratic hold
District 18	14,705	53.05%	13,013	46.95%	-	-	27,718	100.00%	Democratic hold
District 19	12,846	44.58%	15,971	55.42%	-	-	28,817	100.00%	Republican gain
District 20	-	-	34,736	100.00%	-	-	34,736	100.00%	Republican gain
District 21	23,108	69.73%	10,032	30.27%	-	-	33,140	100.00%	Democratic hold
District 22	20,218	100.00%	-	-	-	-	20,218	100.00%	Democratic hold
District 23	23,267	100.00%	-	-	-	-	23,267	100.00%	Democratic hold
District 24	14,746	41.63%	20,673	58.37%	-	-	35,419	100.00%	Republican gain
District 25	8,592	30.97%	19,148	69.03%	-	-	27,740	100.00%	Republican hold
District 26	-	-	26,994	100.00%	-	-	26,994	100.00%	Republican hold
District 27	20,200	62.67%	12,034	37.33%	-	-	32,234	100.00%	Democratic hold
District 28	-	-	25,225	100.00%	-	-	25,225	100.00%	Republican gain
District 29	13,897	42.60%	18,728	57.40%	-	-	32,625	100.00%	Republican gain
District 30	-	-	24,205	100.00%	-	-	24,205	100.00%	Republican hold
District 31	16,665	100.00%	-	-	-	-	16,665	100.00%	Democratic hold
District 32	16,548	46.64%	18,930	53.36%	-	-	35,478	100.00%	Republican hold
District 33	18,930	66.48%	9,545	33.52%	-	-	28,475	100.00%	Democratic hold
District 34	15,379	53.79%	13,211	46.21%	-	-	28,590	100.00%	Democratic hold
District 35	17,040	52.33%	15,522	47.67%	-	-	32,562	100.00%	Democratic hold
District 36	13,606	100.00%	-	-	-	-	13,606	100.00%	Democratic hold
District 37	11,454	100.00%	-	-	-	-	11,454	100.00%	Democratic hold
District 38	12,922	68.00%	6,082	32.00%	-	-	19,004	100.00%	Democratic hold
District 39	11,498	100.00%	-	-	-	-	11,498	100.00%	Democratic hold
District 40	10,869	100.00%	-	-	-	-	10,869	100.00%	Democratic hold
District 41	10,700	100.00%	-	-	-	-	10,700	100.00%	Democratic hold
District 42	26,961	100.00%	-	-	-	-	26,961	100.00%	Democratic hold
District 43	14,940	61.59%	9,319	38.41%	-	-	24,259	100.00%	Democratic hold
District 44	-	-	25,532	100.00%	-	-	25,532	100.00%	Republican gain
District 45	18,633	48.82%	18,298	47.94%	1,239	3.25%	38,170	100.00%	Democratic gain
District 46	19,253	88.29%	-	-	2,553	11.71%	21,806	100.00%	Democratic gain
District 47	15,524	32.69%	30,001	63.18%	1,963	4.13%	47,488	100.00%	Republican hold
District 48	21,928	45.38%	25,309	52.38%	1,084	2.24%	48,321	100.00%	Republican gain
District 49	27,384	70.72%	9,095	23.49%	2,242	5.79%	38,721	100.00%	Democratic hold
District 50	16,029	41.17%	21,699	55.74%	1,203	3.09%	38,931	100.00%	Republican gain
District 51	14,389	82.27%	-	-	3,101	17.73%	17,490	100.00%	Democratic hold
District 52	10,979	31.60%	22,433	64.56%	1,336	3.84%	34,748	100.00%	Republican hold
District 53	-	-	31,675	90.50%	3,325	9.50%	35,000	100.00%	Republican hold
District 54	-	-	18,812	100.00%	-	-	18,812	100.00%	Republican hold
District 55	-	-	23,280	100.00%	-	-	23,280	100.00%	Republican hold
District 56	20,104	51.44%	18,979	48.56%	-	-	39,083	100.00%	Democratic gain
District 57	17,358	60.20%	11,478	39.80%	-	-	28,836	100.00%	Democratic hold
District 58	10,285	31.83%	22,023	68.17%	-	-	32,308	100.00%	Republican hold
District 59	12,337	43.25%	16,186	56.75%	-	-	28,523	100.00%	Republican hold
District 60	-	-	28,762	91.34%	2,726	8.66%	31,488	100.00%	Republican hold
District 61	11,475	31.01%	25,528	68.99%	-	-	37,003	100.00%	Republican hold
District 62	12,217	35.40%	22,295	64.60%	-	-	34,512	100.00%	Republican hold
District 63	-	-	33,951	100.00%	-	-	33,951	100.00%	Republican hold
District 64	-	-	23,272	86.87%	3,518	13.13%	26,790	100.00%	Republican hold
District 65	-	-	22,263	88.18%	2,983	11.82%	25,246	100.00%	Republican hold
District 66	7,485	20.03%	29,000	77.62%	877	2.35%	37,362	100.00%	Republican hold
District 67	8,485	30.18%	19,626	69.82%	-	-	28,111	100.00%	Republican hold
District 68	12,659	34.77%	23,750	65.23%	-	-	36,409	100.00%	Republican hold
District 69	20,252	100.00%	-	-	-	-	20,252	100.00%	Democratic hold
District 70	7,074	19.82%	28,012	78.50%	600	1.68%	35,686	100.00%	Republican gain
District 71	-	-	26,784	91.04%	2,636	8.96%	29,420	100.00%	Republican hold
District 72	9,521	30.38%	21,433	68.40%	383	1.22%	31,337	100.00%	Republican gain
District 73	9,305	20.85%	35,314	79.15%	-	-	44,619	100.00%	Republican gain
District 74	21,326	71.05%	8,688	28.95%	-	-	30,014	100.00%	Democratic hold
District 75	13,267	99.41%	-	-	79	0.59%	13,346	100.00%	Democratic hold
District 76	17,387	100.00%	-	-	-	-	17,387	100.00%	Democratic hold
District 77	13,914	100.00%	-	-	-	-	13,914	100.00%	Democratic hold
District 78	-	-	18,598	100.00%	-	-	18,598	100.00%	Republican hold
District 79	14,170	100.00%	-	-	-	-	14,170	100.00%	Democratic hold
District 80	14,302	55.80%	11,327	44.20%	-	-	25,629	100.00%	Democratic gain
District 81	-	-	21,583	100.00%	-	-	21,583	100.00%	Republican hold
District 82	-	-	28,968	100.00%	-	-	28,968	100.00%	Republican hold
District 83	-	-	31,551	91.10%	3,083	8.90%	34,634	100.00%	Republican hold
District 84	8,547	31.31%	18,088	66.27%	661	2.42%	27,296	100.00%	Republican hold
District 85	21,121	64.63%	11,559	35.37%	-	-	32,680	100.00%	Democratic hold
District 86	-	-	32,387	100.00%	-	-	32,387	100.00%	Republican hold
District 87	8,872	34.18%	17,086	65.82%	-	-	25,958	100.00%	Republican hold
District 88	-	-	27,880	100.00%	-	-	27,880	100.00%	Republican hold
District 89	8,245	22.27%	28,776	77.73%	-	-	37,021	100.00%	Republican hold
District 90	11,731	72.23%	4,511	27.77%	-	-	16,242	100.00%	Democratic hold
District 91	-	-	21,227	84.41%	3,921	15.59%	25,148	100.00%	Republican hold
District 92	-	-	25,248	88.51%	3,278	11.49%	28,526	100.00%	Republican hold
District 93	10,033	43.39%	13,089	56.61%	-	-	23,122	100.00%	Republican hold
District 94	-	-	28,892	100.00%	-	-	28,892	100.00%	Republican hold
District 95	25,188	100.00%	-	-	-	-	25,188	100.00%	Democratic hold
District 96	14,589	39.99%	21,896	60.01%	-	-	36,485	100.00%	Republican hold
District 97	14,291	32.58%	29,579	67.42%	-	-	43,870	100.00%	Republican hold
District 98	-	-	37,366	100.00%	-	-	37,366	100.00%	Republican hold
District 99	10,012	29.44%	23,427	68.89%	566	1.66%	34,005	100.00%	Republican hold
District 100	16,679	95.16%	-	-	849	4.84%	17,528	100.00%	Democratic hold
District 101	-	-	16,947	100.00%	-	-	16,947	100.00%	Republican hold
District 102	-	-	19,136	100.00%	-	-	19,136	100.00%	Republican hold
District 103	9,006	68.75%	3,828	29.22%	266	2.03%	13,100	100.00%	Democratic hold
District 104	10,023	73.99%	3,523	26.01%	-	-	13,546	100.00%	Democratic hold
District 105	-	-	13,461	75.85%	4,287	24.15%	17,748	100.00%	Republican gain
District 106	-	-	13,851	100.00%	-	-	13,851	100.00%	Republican hold
District 107	14,786	41.59%	20,764	58.41%	-	-	35,550	100.00%	Republican gain
District 108	10,862	33.55%	21,514	66.45%	-	-	32,376	100.00%	Republican hold
District 109	26,747	74.50%	9,155	25.50%	-	-	35,902	100.00%	Democratic hold
District 110	19,511	100.00%	-	-	-	-	19,511	100.00%	Democratic hold
District 111	25,721	100.00%	-	-	-	-	25,721	100.00%	Democratic hold
District 112	10,053	29.05%	24,548	70.95%	-	-	34,601	100.00%	Republican hold
District 113	-	-	18,065	100.00%	-	-	18,065	100.00%	Republican hold
District 114	-	-	24,503	100.00%	-	-	24,503	100.00%	Republican hold
District 115	9,588	28.70%	23,823	71.30%	-	-	33,411	100.00%	Republican gain
District 116	15,174	100.00%	-	-	-	-	15,174	100.00%	Democratic hold
District 117	8,138	41.02%	11,703	58.98%	-	-	19,841	100.00%	Republican gain
District 118	14,416	100.00%	-	-	-	-	14,416	100.00%	Democratic hold
District 119	15,451	100.00%	-	-	-	-	15,451	100.00%	Democratic hold
District 120	15,280	100.00%	-	-	-	-	15,280	100.00%	Democratic hold
District 121	-	-	30,720	89.93%	3,441	10.07%	34,161	100.00%	Republican hold
District 122	-	-	39,048	88.45%	5,100	11.55%	44,148	100.00%	Republican hold
District 123	14,461	63.09%	8,088	35.28%	373	1.63%	22,922	100.00%	Democratic gain
District 124	14,970	100.00%	-	-	-	-	14,970	100.00%	Democratic hold
District 125	15,391	60.28%	10,143	39.72%	-	-	25,534	100.00%	Democratic hold
District 126	-	-	24,197	100.00%	-	-	24,197	100.00%	Republican hold
District 127	-	-	28,214	100.00%	-	-	28,214	100.00%	Republican hold
District 128	-	-	16,421	100.00%	-	-	16,421	100.00%	Republican gain
District 129	-	-	26,664	100.00%	-	-	26,664	100.00%	Republican hold
District 130	-	-	29,652	100.00%	-	-	29,652	100.00%	Republican hold
District 131	18,572	100.00%	-	-	-	-	18,572	100.00%	Democratic hold
District 132	-	-	21,079	90.45%	2,225	9.55%	23,304	100.00%	Republican gain
District 133	8,128	34.86%	15,189	65.14%	-	-	23,317	100.00%	Republican hold
District 134	21,645	46.39%	24,520	52.55%	492	1.05%	46,657	100.00%	Republican hold
District 135	7,280	29.76%	17,186	70.24%	-	-	24,466	100.00%	Republican hold
District 136	-	-	31,763	100.00%	-	-	31,763	100.00%	Republican hold
District 137	6,292	54.75%	5,200	45.25%	-	-	11,492	100.00%	Democratic hold
District 138	10,026	40.58%	14,682	59.42%	-	-	24,708	100.00%	Republican gain
District 139	18,559	100.00%	-	-	-	-	18,559	100.00%	Democratic hold
District 140	8,503	73.63%	3,045	26.37%	-	-	11,548	100.00%	Democratic hold
District 141	16,478	100.00%	-	-	-	-	16,478	100.00%	Democratic hold
District 142	20,574	100.00%	-	-	-	-	20,574	100.00%	Democratic hold
District 143	10,175	91.77%	-	-	913	8.23%	11,088	100.00%	Democratic hold
District 144	-	-	15,417	87.51%	2,201	12.49%	17,618	100.00%	Republican hold
District 145	11,087	100.00%	-	-	-	-	11,087	100.00%	Democratic hold
District 146	24,558	92.64%	-	-	1,951	7.36%	26,509	100.00%	Democratic hold
District 147	21,253	100.00%	-	-	-	-	21,253	100.00%	Democratic hold
District 148	14,633	100.00%	-	-	-	-	14,633	100.00%	Democratic hold
District 149	10,530	44.48%	13,144	55.52%	-	-	23,674	100.00%	Republican hold
District 150	-	-	26,174	100.00%	-	-	26,174	100.00%	Republican hold
Total	1,553,606	39.19%	2,338,133	58.98%	72,334	1.82%	3,964,073	100.00%	
