= K Street Project =

Lobbying effort by the US Republican Party

K Street Project's trademark pending logo

The K Street Project was an effort by the Republican Party (GOP) to pressure Washington, D.C. lobbying firms to hire Republicans in top positions, and to reward loyal GOP lobbyists with access to influential officials, an arrangement known as crony capitalism. It was launched in 1995 by Republican strategist Grover Norquist and then-House majority whip Tom DeLay. It has been criticized as being part of a "coziness" between the GOP and large corporations which has allegedly allowed business to rewrite government regulations affecting their own industries in some cases, such as with Dick Cheney's energy task force.

Shortly after the 1994 elections which gave a majority of seats to Republican candidates, DeLay called prominent Washington lobbyists into his office. He had pulled the public records of political contributions that they made to Democrats and Republicans. According to Texans for Public Justice, "he reminded them that Republicans were in charge and their political giving had better reflect that—or else. The "or else" was a threat to cut off access to the Republican House leadership."

The project is named for K Street in Washington, D.C., where the largest lobbying firms once had their headquarters. Lobbyists are, in some circles, referred to as the "fourth branch of government," as some have great influence in U.S. national politics due to their monetary resources and the "revolving-door" practice of hiring former government officials.

Candidates seeking to succeed DeLay as House majority leader sought to distance themselves from the project, and as of January 15, 2006, all three announced candidates had vowed to dismantle it and overhaul the lobbying process. The fundamental quid pro quo at the center of the K Street Project, the withholding of policy favors from interest groups and lobbying firms that hire Democrats, is now illegal: the Honest Leadership and Open Government Act of 2007, Sec 102, bans members of Congress and staffers from using their political power to influence the employment decision of any private entity "on the basis of partisan political affiliation".

== The dossier ==
In 2002, The Washington Post reported on the existence of a dossier compiled by the project, keeping tabs on which lobbying firms and individual lobbyists gave to which politicians and parties. An unnamed GOP lobbyist source told the Washington Post that "you will have this list to control access" to the White House, Congress, and Federal agencies.

According to The New York Times, Grover Norquist claimed "it's an ongoing project that's been updated over the last several years, and this is the most recent iteration." Norquist claimed that the object was "letting people know how many R's and D's are being hired" by certain interest groups, so that these groups would hire more Republicans to represent them.

As a result of this exposure, a letter circulated in Congress reminding members and Senators that it was a violation of ethical standards to limit lobbyists' access based on their political contributions.

== Reactions ==
Former Pennsylvania Senator Rick Santorum, who served in the House before 1994, has often been described as the Senate liaison to the K Street Project, as he met with Norquist on a regular basis to review openings at lobbying firms and the leading candidates for those positions. As the Jack Abramoff lobbying and corruption scandal broke and grew, however, he denied the extent of the role attributed to him. He claimed his meetings with Norquist were not as frequent as asserted, that he did not know Norquist that well, and that he was unaware of a file keeping track of campaign contributions by lobbyists and their firms.

He took particular umbrage at claims to the contrary by then-Senate minority leader Harry Reid, saying they amounted to libel, although he did not deny that meetings took place. He referred to them as "good government" efforts. He claimed he had not seen Norquist in years, but later the blog Crooks and Liars posted a video clip of the two of them sharing a podium at a June 28, 2005 press conference.

Norquist, however, claims that at a 2002 meeting with Santorum and lobbyists he described the project to them. A contemporary report says he described its goals and asked those present to help complete the project. He passed out a list of lobbyists the project was checking on. At that time Santorum did not comment.

Later that year, Norquist publicly commented, "(Santorum) has gotten me in to talk to all those guys."

Santorum also had publicly criticized the Motion Picture Association of America and Boeing for hiring former Clinton Administration officials, but said that was unrelated to his meetings with Norquist.

Roll Call also reported that Abramoff himself attended one of Santorum's meetings in 2001. Santorum says he might have attended but does not specifically recall that.

After the disclosures, Santorum announced the jobs list would no longer be part of the meetings.

Santorum lost his bid for re-election in 2006.

Defending the K Street Project in Human Events, Chuck Muth said that after 40 years of a near-total Democratic control of Congress, most of the top lobbyists in Washington were former Democratic congressional staffers and aides, since lobbyists are valued for their access to power more than their political ideologies. Muth also said that Democrats in Congress had informally done the same thing and forced lobbies to hire former staffers of their own.

== Trademark application ==
On April 6, 2006, Norquist applied, through his organization Americans for Tax Reform, for trademark protection for the term "K Street Project." When the story was reported the following week, he suggested it had been unfairly maligned by the media coverage of the scandal and that it was in fact simply a job-listing service. He promised to enforce it vigorously if it were approved, saying "We will sue anyone who says it wrong and make lots of money."

Democrats and liberals ridiculed the idea, with blogger Josh Marshall wondering if Norquist was trying to corner "exclusive rights to engage in organized corruption under this title in the environs of Washington, DC." Others, like Jennifer Crider, spokeswoman for House minority leader Nancy Pelosi, accused Norquist of trying to keep the term from being associated with Republican corruption in an election year. However, it would take the application a year and a half, well after the election, to be approved at the Patent and Trademark Office's usual pace.

Contrary to Norquist's public statements, his formal application requests trademark status only for the project's actual logo (see above).

However, on July 11, 2006, Norquist filed a second trademark application, this time seeking protection for the term "The K Street Project promotes the hire of lobbyists at corporations and trade associations who understand free-market economics, who support their principled positions for free trade, against tort law abuse, and for lower and more transparent taxation."
