= No Retreat, No Surrender: One American's Fight =

2007 book by Tom DeLay and Stephen Mansfield

- Author: Tom DeLay and Stephen Mansfield
- Publisher: Sentinel HC
- Publication date: March 14, 2007
- Media type: Hardcover
- Pages: 208 pages
- ISBN: 1-59523-034-3
- OCLC: 83309711
- Dewey Decimal: 328.73/092 B 22
- LC Class: E840.8.D455 A3 2007

No Retreat, No Surrender: One American's Fight is a 2007 book by Tom DeLay and Stephen Mansfield. The book has a foreword by Rush Limbaugh and a preface by Sean Hannity.

== Controversy ==
At least one statement about the Clinton administration included in the book—that the Clintons had sought to have military uniforms banned from the White House—had been repeatedly shown to be false prior to the publication of this book.

== See also ==
- The Big Buy: Tom DeLay's Stolen Congress
