= Jim Ellis (lobbyist) =

American political activist

James W. Ellis is a political lobbyist self-described in 2018 as "a 35-year veteran of politics at the state and national levels". Ellis began his career with the San Diego County Republican Party, and then served as an original staff member for then-Congressman Bill Lowery (R-CA). He also worked as President of the Ramhurst Corporation of North Carolina and as a manager of the Public Issues Department of R. J. Reynolds Tobacco Company in Winston-Salem, North Carolina.

== Career and criminal convictions ==
Ellis was the executive director of the Americans for a Republican Majority political action committee (ARMPAC). As such, he was swept up in the indictment of U.S. House of Representatives Majority Leader, Tom DeLay in September 2005. "The Republican congressman was named, along with two political associates, in an indictment handed up by a Travis County grand jury. ... The conspiracy count charges DeLay, 58, and associates John Colyandro and Jim Ellis with wrongdoing in connection with the operation of Texans for a Republican Majority, a political action committee founded by the politician. Since House GOP rules require leaders to step down if charged criminally, DeLay immediately announced that he was relinquishing his leadership post. DeLay, who has repeatedly denied wrongdoing in connection with the PAC's operations, has said that the Texas probe was politically motivated by Travis County District Attorney Ronnie Earle, a Democrat."

DeLay was found guilty in November 2010 of money laundering and conspiracy to commit money laundering. However, after years of appeals and "siding with a decision made ... by a lower appeals court, the Texas Court of Criminal Appeals in 2014 refused to reinstate money-laundering convictions against former U.S. House Majority Leader Tom DeLay. In an 8–1 decision, the state's highest criminal court backed [an earlier] Texas 3rd Court of Appeals decision that reversed DeLay's ... convictions on money laundering and conspiracy to commit money laundering. The court had ruled there was not enough evidence to prove that DeLay's actions were criminal."

In September 2012, Ellis pleaded guilty in a separate campaign finance case related to the DeLay court case to a felony charge of making an illegal campaign contribution during the 2002 election. "Ellis received a four-year probation and was fined $10,000 on a charge that he made a contribution of corporate money to a political party within 60 days of an election. ... Under the terms of Ellis' plea, the adjudication of the third-degree felony charge is deferred ... " Thus, after the four-year probation period expired, the third-degree felony conviction was not recorded in his criminal record. Under the terms of the deal, he also agreed to testify in future legal proceedings and was barred from soliciting or handling corporate political contributions.
