= Red Cavaney =

American businessman and lobbyist

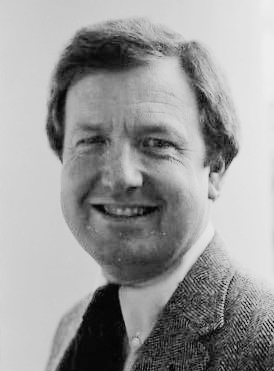
- 1981
- Born: February 26, 1943 (age 83); Kansas City, Missouri
- Education: University of Southern California

Red Cavaney (February 26, 1943) is an American businessman and lobbyist. He is a former CEO of the American Petroleum Institute, of Ericson Yachts, and he served in the administrations of Richard Nixon and Gerald Ford.

== Biography ==
Red Cavaney was born in Kansas City, Missouri on 26 February 1943. He graduated from the University of Southern California in 1964.

He served in the Vietnam War as a United States Navy from 1964 to 1967. He served as a branch manager for the Security Pacific National Bank. From 1978 to 1981, he served as CEO of Ericson Yachts. He served in the administrations of Richard Nixon and Gerald Ford. In 1981, he served as the Deputy Assistant to the President for Public Liaison under President Ronald Reagan. From 1983 to 1993, he was a member of the American Paper Institute. From 1993 to 1994, he was a member of the American Forest & Paper Association. From 1997 to 2008, he served as president and CEO of the American Petroleum Institute. He served as Senior Vice President of Government Affairs of ConocoPhillips until 2012.

He is a member of the American Council for Capital Formation, former chairman of the American Society of Association Executives. He sits on the board of trustees of the Center for Excellence in Education and the Gerald R. Ford Foundation, and the board of directors of the United States Energy Association and Buckeye Technologies. He sits on the advisory board of Mullin Consulting. He is a former board member of the National Association of Manufacturers and the United States Chamber of Commerce.

A Republican, he has been active in Americans for a Republican Majority, Americans for Sound Energy Policy, The Freedom Project, the Monday Morning PAC, the New Republican Majority Fund, the National Republican Congressional Committee, the National Republican Senatorial Committee, and he has been a board member of Rebuilding Together. He has also supported George W. Bush for President in 2000 and 2004, John McCain in 2008, Elizabeth Dole, John Boehner, Kay Bailey Hutchison, and Tom DeLay.
