= Energy Task Force =

Former United States governmental task force

The Energy Task Force, officially the National Energy Policy Development Group (NEPDG), was a task force created by U.S. President George W. Bush in 2001 during his second week in office. Vice President Dick Cheney was named chairman. This group's stated objective was to “develop a national energy policy designed to help the private sector, and, as necessary and appropriate, State and local governments, promote dependable, affordable, and environmentally sound production and distribution of energy for the future." The final report was released on May 16, 2001.

The Bush Transition Energy Advisory Team shaped the administration's supply-side energy policy administration and was a precursor to the Energy Task Force.

== Background ==
Secretary of Energy Spencer Abraham told a National Energy Summit on March 19, 2001, that America was going to face an energy supply crisis in the next 20 years. He believed that if America was not adequately prepared for those demands then the foundations for the prosperity of the country would be threatened. The Energy Task Force was developed to decrease American dependency on foreign petroleum, which the National Energy Policy deemed would have a negative effect on the US economy, standards of living and national security.

The Task Force was composed of Vice President Dick Cheney and the Secretaries of State, Treasury, Interior, Agriculture, Commerce, Transportation and Energy, as well as other cabinet and senior administration-level officials. According to the Government Accountability Office (GAO), these members held ten meetings over the course of three and a half months with petroleum, coal, nuclear, natural gas, and electricity industry representatives and lobbyists. None of the meetings were open to the public and no non-federal participants were involved. The first phase of the project was to inform the President of current energy supply problems and changes needed to the economic policy. This was completed on March 19, 2001, while the second phase, the presentation of the National Energy Policy, was completed on May 16, 2001.

The GAO stated that "the National Energy Policy report was the product of a centralized, top-down, short- term, and labor-intensive process that involved the efforts of several hundred federal employees governmentwide". This meant that the cabinet officials members held the authority in developing the report, while working groups drafted sample reports and findings for them.

== National Energy Policy ==
The National Energy Policy Development Group completed its report in the beginning of 2001. The 169- page report, released on May 17, 2001, was titled the National Energy Policy (NEP).

Included in the proposed policy is the importance of energy efficiency and conservation. Using energy wisely is cited as the first challenge for the nation, as this will lessen the burden on our finances and the environment. The second listed challenge was to repair and add to the existing network of refineries, pipelines, generators and transmission lines. It was stated that the refining and distribution of natural gas were affected by an inefficient and inadequate infrastructure and that this issue could be remedied by 38,000 miles of new pipeline and 255,000 miles of distribution lines. The third challenge is "increasing energy supplies while protecting the environment". This section states that although renewable energy is a hope for the future, it will be many years until this energy is sufficient for the nations current needs, and therefore the requirements must be met using the available means.

=== Foreign energy sources ===
One of the widely disputed aspects of the proposed National Energy Policy is how the plan suggests balancing needs for future sources of renewable energy with the immediate reliance on petroleum. In Chapter Six of the policy, titled "Nature’s Power: Increasing America’s Use of Renewable and Alternative Energy", domestic energy sources such as wind, geothermal, solar and bio-fuel are cited as necessary to stabilize and protect the United States' interests. Future energy sources such as hydrogen and fusion are also cited as long-term projects. However, the Policy also states the necessity for plans to improve and expand the current pipeline systems within the US, implying that reliance on oil and natural gas will exist for years to come. The plan then goes on to detail American interests in foreign energy resources. In a section titled "Diversity of Supply", the policy explains why diversifying dependence on foreign oil is a key factor in securing short term stability. Canada, South America and the Caribbean, Africa, Russia and Asia were all detailed as having supplies of oil that could add to the supply of resources available to US consumption.

== President Barack Obama's energy policy ==
=== Protecting American energy ===
During Barack Obama's presidency, America saw an increase in oil production. It was especially high in the year of 2011. The Obama administration took steps to ensure that America's need for oil would also safeguard the protection of the environment as well. Although oil production has increased, America's dependency on foreign oil has decreased. The total consumption of imported oil has decreased from 57% in 2008 to 45% in 2011, which is the lowest it has been for about 20 years.

President Obama made strict guidelines to standardize fuel economy in vehicles, especially passenger vehicles. Statistically, vehicles with fuel economy benefits improve the environment and lower fuel costs. The Obama Administration finalized a new regulation that would require commercial trucks, vans, and buses produced in the years 2014–2018 to be tested for national fuel economy and greenhouse gas emission standards. Barack Obama has also made investments to manufacture efficient batteries for hybrid and electric vehicles. The Administration is funding research that would help increase the use of natural gas and reduce oil consumption.

=== Adjusting to climatic changes ===
Another goal that President Barack Obama had in regards to efficient energy use was to reduce emissions that are unsafe to the environment, which in turn would result in climate change and cause air and water pollution. He made efforts to gather other world leaders, in December 2009, and have them agree to make this an international endeavor. It has been noted that the Obama Administration has made the largest investment in the American history to have clean energy through renewable power generation. One of the ways to ensure this goal is by monitoring greenhouse gas emissions from direct and indirect sources. President Obama has started a Climate Change Adaptation Task Force, to aid in policies and programs on a Federal level. With the use of interagency decisions can be made on how to protect the environment and local communities against changing climatic conditions. The agency also created strategies that would shield wildlife and freshwater resources.

=== Protecting the environment as a whole ===
On the grand scale, President Obama is taking measures to protect the American soil, the bodies of water and the atmosphere from severe pollution and other problems caused by inefficient energy use. He plans to have an interagency collaboration on a Federal level so that the environmental issues facing America could be solved or even brought down. The Recovery Act of 1999 has programs and projects that would entail the protection of our environment through agencies including the Environmental Protection Agency and Department of Interior. These agencies oversee funding for many big projects like those that promote going green. The Act also invests in advancing in technology so that American people can enjoy the long-term effects of a clean environment. The National Ocean Policy looks after resources that are critical to America and prioritize them accordingly. They ensure that United States has oceans and coastal regions that healthy that people can enjoy.

In his efforts to preserve and conserve land, Obama signed the Omnibus Public Land Management Act in 2009. Through this act he was able to vastly expand American land. The Clean Water Act already does some regulation to protect the American waters. Nonetheless, a draft has been submitted requesting a specific list of those water bodies protected under this list and which ones are considered federally controlled water bodies. The Obama Administration has now modernized the National Environmental Policy Act (NEPA) in order to allow a fair governing on the quality of our environment. The revision is for better and improved efforts by the Federal agencies on protecting communities, the economy and also to find ways to get the American public to be involved in the decision making.

== Controversy ==
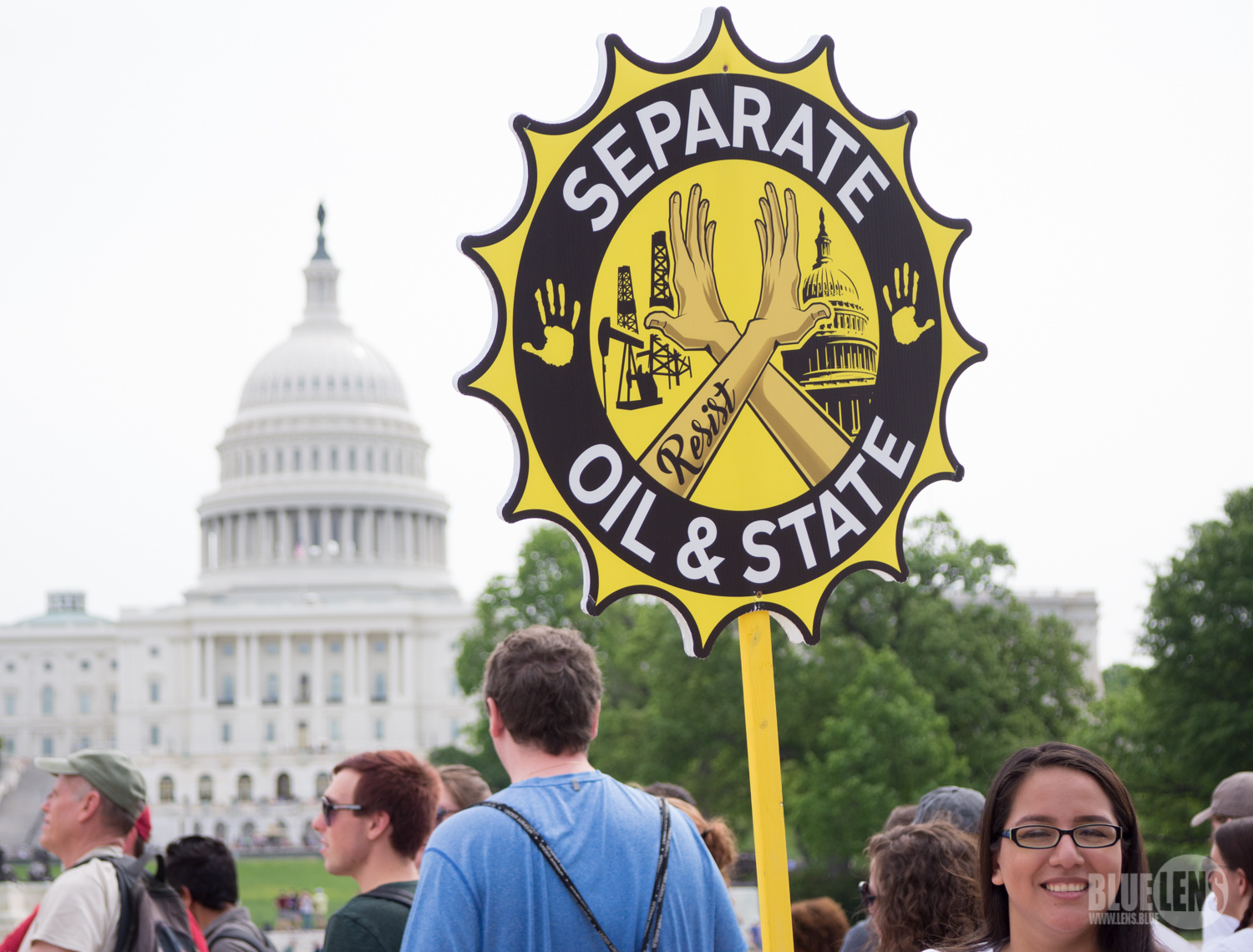
Placard "Separate oil and state", at the People's Climate March (2017).

Most of the activities of the Energy Task Force have not been disclosed to the public, even though Freedom of Information Act (FOIA) requests (since 19 April 2001) have sought to gain access to its materials. The organisations Judicial Watch and Sierra Club launched a lawsuit (U.S. District Court for the District of Columbia: Judicial Watch Inc. v. Department of Energy, et al., Civil Action No. 01-0981) under the FOIA to gain access to the task force's materials. Additionally, the Natural Resources Defense Council (NRDC), an environmental advocacy group, filed a suit to obtain the records of the task force meeting in April 2001. In the spring of 2002, the U.S. Department of Energy released approximately 13,500 pages to the NRDC related to the NEP. After several years of legal wrangling, in May, 2005 an appeals court permitted the Energy Task Force's records to remain secret.

In 2001, the energy task force that Cheney had commenced in secret finally went public. Soon afterwards, the United States House of Representatives approved the measures and decided to legalize the new policy set forth by Cheney. Upon revision of the policy it was evident that many of the regulations and recommendations were pro-Oil company. The policy assigned little accountability for mistakes or harmful actions to those in authority, especially the government officials. This policy was to provide very specific guidelines to run the Energy Task Force efficiently and effectively.

The NEP was intended to be a directive with clear instructions on how to proceed with the new task force. Despite the fact that renewable energy was the purpose behind establishing this force, only seven of the 105 recommendations in the final report referenced renewable energy. Many of the big oil companies benefited from the policy. There is some speculation, however, that some of the congressmen profited from the policy due to the major contributions they got from these companies.

On April 4, 2001, representatives of 13 environmental groups, including Erich Pica of Friends of the Earth and Anna Aurilio of the U.S. Public Interest Group, met with the Task Force (although not with Vice President Cheney personally). Environmental groups have speculated that this meeting was an attempt to appease them, since it is reported that a draft paper had already been produced at the time of this meeting and that half of the meeting was spent on various members introducing themselves. No further meetings between the task force and the environmental groups were reported, although there had been at least 40 meetings between the task force and representatives of the energy industry and its interest groups.

The Washington Post reported on November 15, 2005, that it had obtained documents listing executives from major oil corporations, including ExxonMobil, Conoco, Royal Dutch Shell, and the American subsidiary of BP who met with Energy Task Force participants while they were developing national energy policy. Vice President Cheney was reported to have met personally with the chief executive officer of BP during the time of the Energy Task Force's activities. In the week prior to this article revealing oil executive involvement, the Chief Executives of ExxonMobil and ConocoPhillips told members of the US Senate that they had not participated as part of the Energy Task Force, while the CEO of BP stated that he did not know. In response to questions regarding the article, Cheney spokesperson Lea Ann McBride was quoted as saying that the courts have upheld "the constitutional right of the president and vice president to obtain information in confidentiality."

On July 18, 2007, The Washington Post reported the names of those involved in the Task Force, including at least 40 meetings with interest groups, most of them from energy-producing industries. Among those in the meetings were James J. Rouse, then vice president of ExxonMobil and a major donor to the Bush inauguration; Kenneth L. Lay, then head of Enron; Jack N. Gerard, then with the National Mining Association; Red Cavaney, president of the American Petroleum Institute; and Eli Bebout, an old friend of Cheney's from Wyoming who serves in the state Senate and owns an oil and drilling company.

== See also ==
- Fossil fuels lobby
