= Americans for a Republican Majority =

Republican political action committee

Americans for a Republican Majority (also ARMPAC) was a political action committee formed by former Republican House Majority Leader Tom DeLay and directed by Karl Gallant. On July 7, 2006, ARMPAC reached an agreement with the Federal Election Commission to pay a fine of $115,000 for various violations and to shut down operations. It filed its termination papers on April 24, 2007.

== History ==
Originally formed by Tom DeLay (R-Texas), Jim Ellis and several of close associates, ARMPAC was created with the goal of electing a Republican majority in the United States Congress for the 2000 elections. The millions of dollars ARMPAC raised were responsible for the success of many Republican candidates, officeholders, and PACs nationwide.

An FEC audit of ARMPAC's activities during the 2002 campaign cycle (January 1, 2000 to December 31, 2002) found failures to report debts, contributions, and assets, as well as a failure to properly separate federal and non-federal spending. On 28 July 2005, the FEC approved enforcement for the matter after accepting the audit. Dani DeLay Ferro, DeLay's daughter and spokeswoman, said the fine and shutdown of ARMPAC were voluntary. In a statement, she said that the audit "concerns highly technical FEC reporting rules, which due to their complexity, the commission has since reformed and simplified".

ARMPAC provided the blueprint for Texans for a Republican Majority (TRMPAC), a state-level PAC founded in Austin by Ellis and DeLay in 2001.

== Payments to relatives ==
From 2001 to January 31, 2006, ARMPAC paid Christine DeLay (DeLay's wife); Dani DeLay Ferro, and Ferro's Texas firm a total of $350,304 in political consulting fees and expenses.

== Officers and notable members ==
| Name | Position | Ref. | Notes |
|---|---|---|---|
| Edwin Buckham | Co-founder | | |
| James W. Ellis | Executive Director | | |
| Red Cavaney | | | Former CEO of the American Petroleum Institute |
| John Colyandro | | | Later ran Texans for a Republican Majority |
| Tom DeLay | Founder | | |
| Karl Gallant | Director | | Also helped run Republican Majority Issues Committee |
| Don McGahn | Attorney | | Tom DeLay's former attorney. Later was appointed White House Counsel under President Donald Trump. |
| Warren Robold | Fundraiser | | |
| Corwin Teltschik | Treasurer | | |

== See also ==
- Texans for a Republican Majority
- Cleta Mitchell
