= 2003 Texas redistricting =

Controversial redistricting of Texas's districts for the U.S. House of Representatives

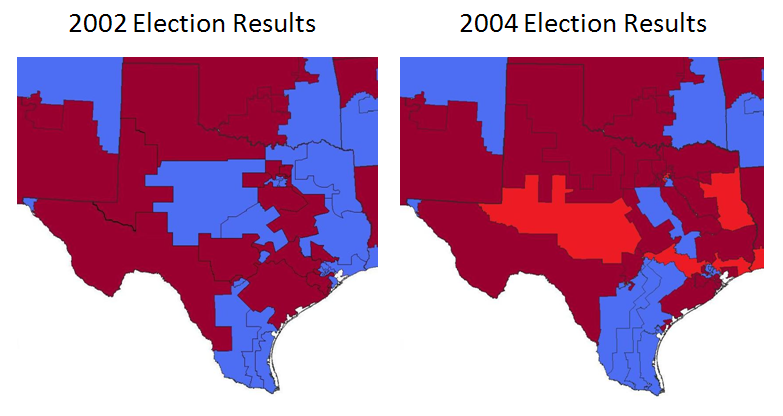
Comparison of U.S. House election results for Texas in 2002 and 2004 after the creation of new boundaries for congressional districts following mid-term redistricting in 2003. Blue denotes a Democratic hold, dark red denotes a Republican hold, and light red denotes a Republican gain.

In 2003, Texas enacted a controversial intercensus redistricting plan that defined congressional districts. In the 2004 elections, this redistricting supported the Republicans taking a majority of Texas's federal House seats for the first time since Reconstruction. Democrats in both houses of the Texas Legislature staged walkouts, unsuccessfully trying to prevent the changes. Opponents challenged the plan in three suits, combined when the case went to the United States Supreme Court in League of United Latin American Citizens v. Perry (2006).

On June 28, 2006, the Supreme Court upheld the statewide redistricting as constitutional, with the exception of Texas's 23rd congressional district, which it held was racially gerrymandered in violation of Section 2 of the 1965 Voting Rights Act, apparently to try to protect a Hispanic Republican representative. A three-judge Federal District Court redrew District 23 and four other nearby districts: 15, 21, 25, and 28. In November 2006, a special election was held in the new districts. All incumbents won except in District 23. There, Republican incumbent Henry Bonilla was forced into a December run-off after a jungle primary; he lost to Democratic challenger Ciro Rodriguez.

== Overview ==
Changes in boundaries for Texas's congressional districts following the 2003 Texas redistricting Territory which was moved to a new district Districts which were entirely unchanged Districts which contained none of their prior territory

After Republicans won control of the Texas state legislature in 2002 for the first time in 130 years, they intended to work toward establishing a majority of House of Representatives seats from Texas held by their party. After the 2002 election, Democrats had a 17–15 edge in House seats representing Texas or 53% of the seats to Republican's 47%, although the state voted for Republicans in congressional races 53.3%–43.8%. After a protracted partisan struggle, the legislature enacted a new congressional districting map, Plan 1374C, introduced in the Texas House by Representative Phil King of Weatherford. In the 2004 elections, Republicans won 21 seats to the Democrats' 11, which suggested they had considerably surpassed their margin of preference among voters.

On June 28, 2006, the Supreme Court of the United States issued an opinion that threw out one of the districts in the plan as a violation of the 1965 Voting Rights Act because of racial gerrymandering. It ordered the lower court to produce a remedial plan, which it did in Plan 1440C. The Supreme Court ruling was not considered to seriously threaten Republican gains from the 2004 elections.

== 1991–2003 evolution and Tom DeLay's role ==
The Texas Legislature had last enacted a congressional redistricting plan in 1991, following the 1990 census. At the time, Democrats held both the governor's seat (with Ann Richards) and control of both state legislative branches. By the 2000 census, Republicans had recaptured the state executive branch, having elected Governor George W. Bush and Lt. Governor Rick Perry, as well as control of the Texas Senate. Democrats maintained their majority in the Texas House of Representatives.

In 2001, Democrats and Republicans were unable to agree on new district maps to respond to the latest census. The Republican minority recommended the issue be submitted to a panel of judges, per state law. The judges, being "hesitant to undo the work of one political party for the benefit of another", drew a new map which left many of the 1991 districts intact. It yielded a 17-to-15 Democratic majority in Texas's US House delegation after the 2002 elections.

For Texas House and Senate redistricting, the Texas Constitution provides that the Legislative Redistricting Board (LRB) convenes when the state legislature is unable to approve, for either body, a redistricting plan in the first legislative session following the census. In June 2001, the task of redistricting passed to the LRB after the state legislature failed to pass a redistricting plan for either the House or Senate. The LRB consists of five statewide officials, the Lieutenant Governor, the Speaker of the House, the Attorney General, the State Comptroller, and the Commissioner of the General Land Office. Four of these five officials were Republican, and the resulting redistricting plans were seen as favorable to Republicans.

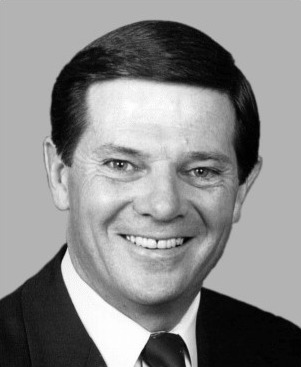
Tom DeLay led the Republican effort to redraw congressional districts between censuses.

In September 2001, then House Majority Whip Tom DeLay (TX-22) organized Texans for a Republican Majority (TRMPAC), a political action committee designed to gather campaign funds for Republican candidates throughout Texas—in particular with an eye to gaining control of the state House Speakership, then held by Democrat Pete Laney. TRMPAC was modeled closely after DeLay's Americans for a Republican Majority (ARMPAC), a federal-level organization created to raise funds for Republicans during the 2000 national elections. Simultaneously, as has been well documented in the media, DeLay played a key role in the ongoing Texas redistricting effort.

=== Special legislative sessions ===
In 2002, after winning a majority of seats in the State House of Representatives, Republicans gained complete control of the legislature. With the urging of Governor Rick Perry and Tom Delay, who had assumed the position of US House Majority Leader in January 2003, the Republican majority introduced legislation to redraw the court-drawn districts from 2001.

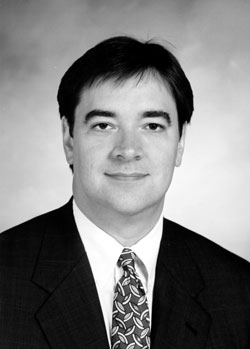
Jim Dunnam led the "Killer Ds" walkout.

Lacking sufficient votes to stop the new plan, 52 Democratic members fled the state to prevent a quorum (an act known as quorum-busting) in the Texas House, effectively preventing a vote from taking place during the regular session. The 52 Democrats, known as the "Killer Ds", returned to the state when time had expired for the bill. But in the summer of 2003, Governor Rick Perry called a series of special legislative sessions in order to continue the redistricting effort. With control of more than one-third of the seats in the State Senate, the Democrats invoked a two-thirds rule, preventing a vote on the redistricting plan during the first special session. Half an hour after ending the first special session, Governor Perry called a second special session. This time, due to the calendaring of the redistricting bill, the two-thirds rule would not come into play.

Eleven of the twelve Democratic state senators left the state to prevent a quorum. The Senators assembled in Albuquerque, New Mexico and were referred to as the Texas Eleven. After a month-long stand off, Senator John Whitmire returned to the State Senate. The redistricting plan was passed in a third special legislative session. After the 2004 elections, Texas' U.S. House delegation had a Republican majority, 21-11, for the first time since Reconstruction.

An article in the March 6, 2006, issue of The New Yorker magazine, written by Jeffrey Toobin, quoted Texas's junior Republican Senator John Cornyn as saying, "Everybody who knows Tom knows that he's a fighter and a competitor, and he saw an opportunity to help the Republicans stay in power in Washington." Toobin reported that DeLay left Washington and returned to Texas to oversee the project while final voting was underway in the state legislature, and that "several times during the long days of negotiating sessions, DeLay personally shuttled proposed maps among House and Senate offices in Austin." Texas Monthly editor Paul Burka, writing in the magazine's May 2006 issue, characterized the measure as "DeLay's midcensus congressional redistricting plan" and said, "[I]n order to increase his Republican majority in Congress, he [DeLay] resorted to a midcensus redistricting plan."

List of the "Killer Ds"
- Roberto R. Alonzo (Dallas)
- Kevin E. Bailey (Houston)
- Lon M. Burnam (Fort Worth)
- Gabriella Canales (Alice)
- Jaime Capelo (Corpus Christi)
- Joaquín Castro (San Antonio)
- Garnet F. Coleman (Houston)
- Robert L. (Robby) Cook 3d (Eagle Lake)
- Yvonne Davis (Dallas)
- Joseph D. (Joe) Deshotel (Beaumont)
- Dawnna M. Dukes (Austin)
- James R. (Jim) Dunnam (Waco)
- A. Craig Eiland (Galveston)
- Dan Ellis (Huntsville)
- Juan Manuel Escobar (Kingsville)
- David L. Farabee (Wichita Falls)
- Jessica Cristina Farrar (Houston)
- Pete P. Gallego (Alpine)
- Timoteo Garza (Eagle Pass)
- Ryan Guillen (Rio Grande City)
- L. Scott Hochberg (Houston)
- Gladys E. (Terri) Hodge (Dallas)
- Mark S. Homer (Paris)
- Charles L. Hopson 2d (Jacksonville)
- Jesse W. Jones (Dallas)
- James E. (Pete) Laney (Hale Center)
- John P. Mabry, Jr. (Waco)
- F.F. (Trey) Martinez Fischer 3d (San Antonio)
- Ruth Jones McClendon (San Antonio)
- James M. (Jim) McReynolds (Lufkin)
- José A. Menéndez (San Antonio)
- Joe E. Moreno (Houston)
- Paul C. Moreno (El Paso)
- Elliott Naishtat (Austin)
- Richard J. (Rick) Noriega (Houston)
- René O. Oliveira (Brownsville)
- Dora F. Olivo (Missouri City)
- L. Aaron Peña, Jr. (Edinburg)
- Joseph C. (Joe) Pickett (El Paso)
- Robert R. Puente (San Antonio)
- Inocente (Chente) Quintanilla (Tornillo)
- Richard E. Raymond (Laredo)
- Allan B. Ritter (Nederland)
- Eduardo R. (Eddie) Rodriguez (Austin)
- Patrick M. Rose (Dripping Springs)
- José S. (Jim) Solis (Harlingen)
- Barry B. Telford (DeKalb)
- Senfronia P. Thompson (Houston)
- Carlos I. Uresti (San Antonio)
- Michael U. Villarreal (San Antonio)
- Miguel D. Wise, Jr. (Weslaco)
- Steven D. Wolens (Dallas)

List of the "Texas Eleven"
- Gonzalo Barrientos (Austin)
- Rodney Ellis (Houston)
- Mario Gallegos (Houston)
- Juan "Chuy" Hinojosa (McAllen)
- Eddie Lucio, Jr. (Brownsville)
- Frank Madla (San Antonio)
- Eliot Shapleigh (El Paso)
- Leticia Van de Putte (San Antonio)
- Royce West (Dallas)
- John Whitmire (Houston)
- Judith Zaffirini (Laredo)

== Justice Department review ==
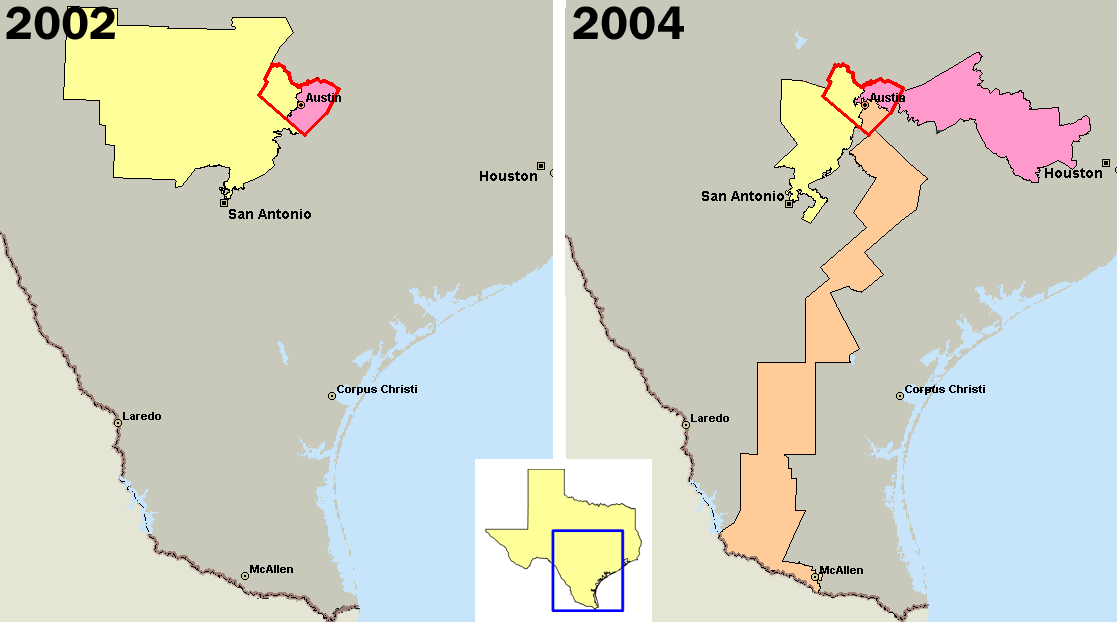
U.S. congressional districts covering Travis County, Texas (outlined in red) in 2002, left, and 2004, right. In 2003, the majority of Republicans in the Texas legislature redistricted the state. The plan diluted the voting power of Democratic residents of this county by distributing its residential areas among majority-Republican districts.

At the time of the 2003 redistricting, Texas was under the pre-clearance requirements of Section 5 of the Voting Rights Act of 1965. The State of Texas obtained pre-clearance from the US Department of Justice for its 2003 congressional redistricting plan.

But in December 2005, The Washington Post reported, "Justice Department lawyers concluded that the landmark Texas congressional redistricting plan spearheaded by Rep. Tom DeLay violated the Voting Rights Act, according to a previously undisclosed memo," uncovered by the newspaper. The document, endorsed by six Justice Department attorneys, said

[T]he redistricting plan illegally diluted black and Hispanic voting power in two congressional districts ... The State of Texas has not met its burden in showing that the proposed congressional redistricting plan does not have a discriminatory effect.

In addition, according to the Post, Justice Department lawyers "found that Republican lawmakers and state officials who helped craft the proposal were aware it posed a high risk of being ruled discriminatory compared with other options". Texas legislators proceeded with the new plan "because it would maximize the number of Republican federal lawmakers in the state".

The article noted that senior political appointees in the Justice Department had overridden the position and findings by the Civil Rights Division's career civil service staff lawyers and analysts, and approved the redistricting.

== Criticism ==
Democrats criticized the 2003 redistricting plan, citing the lack of precedent for redistricting twice in a decade (a so-called "mid-decade" redistricting) and argued that it was conducted for purely political gain by the Republican Party. Public comments by some Republicans lent support to this latter claim, since many discussed their expectations of picking up several Republican seats. Some minority groups argued the plan was unconstitutional, as it would dilute their influence and possibly violate the "one-person-one-vote" principle of redistricting. Republicans argued that, since most voters in the state were Republicans, that they be represented by a majority-Republican congressional delegation in Washington.

The 2004 elections under the new redistricting resulted in Texas Republicans gaining a majority of House seats by a 21–11 margin, nearly a 2/1 ratio in terms of seats (66% of seats). This was significantly larger than the 61/38 voting ratio of Republicans to Democrats in the Presidential race. The ratio of Republicans to Democrats who won seats in the race was much more lopsided than the total results of just the 32 House races themselves. While about 66% of Texas's U.S. House of Representatives seats were won by Republicans, the percentages of the actual votes cast were 56% for Republicans, 40% for Democrats, and 3% for others. (Note that the two main parties did not both run candidates in four districts.)

== 2006 Supreme Court review ==
The US Supreme Court issued an opinion on the case in League of United Latin American Citizens v. Perry on June 28, 2006. While the Court said states are free to redistrict as often as desired, the justices ruled that Texas's 23rd congressional district was invalid, as it violated Section 2 of the 1965 Voting Rights Act by racial gerrymandering. This decision required lawmakers to adjust boundaries in line with the Court's ruling.

A three-judge panel, under an order from the U.S. Court of Appeals, oversaw the redistricting. On June 29, 2006, a U.S. District Judge ordered both sides to submit proposed maps by July 14, respond to their opponents' maps by July 21, and be prepared to hold oral arguments on August 3.

== Targeted Democrats ==
The 2003 redistricting targeted ten districts with white Democratic incumbents, avoiding the seven districts with minority Democratic incumbents.

- Max Sandlin (TX-1) was defeated in 2004 by Republican Louie Gohmert.
- Jim Turner (TX-2) did not seek reelection in 2004. His seat was won by Republican Ted Poe.
- Ralph Hall (TX-4) changed his party affiliation to Republican and was reelected in 2004.
- Nick Lampson (TX-9) was moved to the 2nd district as a result of the redistricting and was defeated by Ted Poe. He relocated to the Sugar Land area in 2006 and ran for the seat being vacated by Tom DeLay (who had resigned due to pending conspiracy and money laundering charges). He won election to the historically Republican 22nd district that year, but in 2008 he was defeated by the Republican Pete Olson.
- Lloyd Doggett (TX-10) was moved to the 25th district, created as a narrow strip running from Austin south to the Mexican border, and derisively called the "fajita strip" for containing a majority of Hispanics. Doggett won re-election in the new district after defeating District Court Judge Leticia Hinojosa from McAllen. After a Supreme Court ruling found the nearby 23rd district violated the Voting Rights Act, the 25th district was redrawn for the 2006 election, where Rep. Doggett again prevailed.
- Chet Edwards (TX-11) was moved into the 17th district, which had a higher percentage of Republican voters in its new form. Despite this, the Democrat Edwards was re-elected in 2004, 2006 and 2008. In 2010 he was defeated by Republican Bill Flores.
- Charlie Stenholm (TX-17) was shifted into the heavily Republican 19th district. He unsuccessfully ran against that district's Republican incumbent, Randy Neugebauer.
- Martin Frost (TX-24) saw his district split off into several newly drawn Dallas-area districts intended to favor and elect Republicans. He changed his residency to run in the 32nd district and lost to the district's Republican incumbent, Pete Sessions. Frost's old district, in its redrawn form, was won by Kenny Marchant, a Republican state legislator from Carrollton.
- Chris Bell (TX-25) had his district renumbered as the 9th district, which was gerrymandered into a minority-majority district. Bell lost the Democratic primary to Al Green, NAACP president of Texas, who easily won the general election.
- Gene Green (TX-29) was reelected in 2004. Of the Democrats affected by redistricting, Green is the only one who won reelection without being shifted to another district or changing parties. He was the only white Democrat left among representatives from the Houston area, and he represented a Latino-majority district until his retirement in 2018.

The redistricting appeared intended to protect Henry Bonilla, a Hispanic Republican of TX-23. He had faced a stiff challenge from conservative Democrat Henry Cuellar in 2002. It also neutralized liberal Democrat Ciro Rodriguez. This was done by putting the two Democrats in the same district and forcing them to run against each other for the Democratic nomination (Cuellar won).

In 2006, however, the Supreme Court ruling required redrawing the boundaries for TX-23. It resulted in a special election, in which Bonilla faced six Democratic candidates and an independent in a jungle primary. He was defeated by Democrat Ciro Rodriguez in the run-off.

== See also ==
- Call of the house
- 2025 Texas redistricting
