= Ronnie Earle =

American politician and judge (1942–2020)

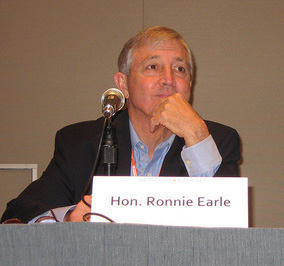
- Earle in 2008

District Attorney for Travis County, Texas
- In office 1977–2009
- Preceded by: Robert O. Smith
- Succeeded by: Rosemary Lehmberg

Member of the Texas House of Representatives from the 37-3 district
- In office July 29, 1973 – December 14, 1976

Personal details
- Born: Ronald Dale Earle; February 23, 1942 Fort Worth, Texas
- Died: April 5, 2020 (aged 78) Austin, Texas, U.S.
- Party: Democratic

Ronald Dale Earle (February 23, 1942 – April 5, 2020) was an American attorney, judge and Democratic Party politician who served as district attorney for Travis County, Texas from 1977 to 2009. He also represented Austin in the Texas House of Representatives from 1973 to 1976. Earle was a fixture in Travis County politics for over three decades and once joked that he was the "District Eternity". As the lead prosecutor in the state's capital, Earle led several high-profile prosecutions of state political figures, including himself, and gained national attention in September 2005 for filing charges under state campaign finance law against United States House of Representatives majority leader Tom DeLay which eventually resulted in DeLay's resignation from Congress. He also led criminal justice reform efforts in Travis County which focused on crime prevention, alternative sentencing, victim advocacy, and reintegration of criminal offenders into society.

== Early life ==
Earle was born in Fort Worth, Texas on February 23, 1942 and raised on a cattle ranch in Birdville, Texas. As a high school student, he achieved the rank of Eagle Scout, earned money working as a lifeguard, played football, and was president of his high school student council.

Earle moved to Austin when he was 19 to attend the University of Texas and the University of Texas School of Law. In 1967, while a law student, he went to work in the office of Texas Governor John Connally.

After graduating from law school, he was appointed and served as a municipal judge in Austin from 1969 to 1972. At the time, he was the youngest judge in Texas.

Earle was elected to the Texas House of Representatives as a Democrat in 1972, serving until 1976.

== Travis County District Attorney ==
Earle was elected district attorney of Travis County in 1976 and served until his retirement in 2008. He faced opponents only twice during his unprecedented tenure. He was, and his successor now is, the only Democrat with statewide prosecutorial authority. While his high-profile prosecutions of elected officials garnered the most press attention, it was Earle's work in criminal justice reform that was his primary focus. He was an early champion of reforms that, in his words, were "engaging the community in its own protection." Earle's innovations focused on crime prevention, alternative sentencing, victim advocacy, and the reintegration of former offenders into society. He spoke nationally on this work, and engaged in criminal justice reform efforts until his death.

Earle spoke extensively on his belief that the law guided public responses to crime but that it was society's collective "ethics infrastructure" that required support to deliver a safer, more just, and more livable community. This belief guided him, as he told the Austin Chronicle in 2008, "It really informs everything I've tried to do – well, not everything, but most of the things I've tried to do as district attorney, especially the most progressive and innovative things that we have done in this office. And the reason is because the law doesn't teach you how to act. ... What I have come to call the 'ethics infrastructure' teaches you how to act. And that is in that work of mommas and daddies and aunts and uncles and teachers and preachers and neighbors and cousins and friends – that's where you learn how to act, not from the law."

=== Prosecutions of public officials ===
During his tenure, Earle prosecuted a variety of elected officials from both sides of the aisle, often dismissing accusations of partisanship by pointing out that prosecutions tend to focus on officials in power. He prosecuted Texas Attorney General Jim Mattox, a Democrat; United States Senator Kay Bailey Hutchison, a Republican; and – in his most high-profile case – United States House Majority Leader, Congressman Tom Delay, a Republican. Mattox was acquitted by a jury, Hutchison's case was dismissed, and DeLay was found guilty of money laundering, but his case was later overturned on appeal by the Texas Court of Criminal Appeals.

Through the Travis County Public Integrity Unit, Earle prosecuted politicians, including Senator Kay Bailey Hutchison, United States House Majority Leader Tom Delay, Texas State Representative Mike Martin, and Texas Attorney General Jim Mattox. Defendants often accused Earle of partisanship, which he dismissed by pointing out that the prosecuted those in power, and that the bulk of prosecutions during his career had been brought against fellow Democrats.

Prosecutions which Earle led as Travis County District Attorney through the Public Integrity Unit include:

- In 1978, Earle accused Texas Supreme Court Justice Don Yarbrough, a Democrat, of forgery, aggravated perjury, and failure to appear.
- In 1979, he accused Travis County Commissioner Bob Honts, a Democrat, of official misconduct and bribery. Commissioner Honts pled guilty to a misdemeanor, "misapplying county property", in 1984. He was ordered to pay a $2,000 fine.
- In 1980, Earle accused Texas State Senator Eugene 'Gene' Jones, a Democrat from Houston, of using a state computer to prepare campaign mailings. Jones pled guilty to a misdemeanor charge of official misconduct, paid $2,000 fine and $10,000 in restitution.
- In 1981, Texas State Treasurer Warren G. Harding, a Democrat, pled guilty to class A misdemeanor of official misconduct. He received a one-year deferred adjudication, paid a $2,000 fine, and paid $2,000 in restitution.
- In 1983, the Speaker of the Texas House of Representatives, Gib Lewis, a Democrat, pled guilty to a class B misdemeanor for failing to file his financial statement. He paid an $800 fine.
- In 1983, Earle accused then-Attorney General Jim Mattox of threatening Fulbright & Jaworski's municipal bond business unless one of their lawyers stopped trying to question his sister, Janice Mattox, about a bank loan. The loan was an issue in a lawsuit involving Mobil Oil Co. and Clinton Manges, a South Texas oil man and rancher who financially supported Mattox, who was acquitted after a long trial.
- In 1983, San Antonio Voter Registrar Marco Gomez, a Democrat, pled guilty to charges of "securing execution of document by deception and tampering with a governmental record." He received 10 years probation, 90 days in the Travis County Jail, paid $49,994 in restitution, and paid a $2,000 fine.
- In 1983, Texas State Representative Charles Staniswallis, a Republican, pled guilty to charges of theft and tampering with a governmental record. Staniswallis received 10 years probation, paid a $2,000 fine, and paid $8,976 in restitution.
- In 1992, the Speaker of the Texas House of Representatives, Gib Lewis, a Democrat, pled guilty to two counts of filing false financial statements. He paid a $1,000 fine on each count.
- In 1994, Earle filed charges against Senator Kay Bailey Hutchison, a Republican then serving as Texas State Treasurer, for tampering with physical evidence, tampering with a governmental record, and official misconduct. On the first day in court, following an evidentiary hearing in which it became clear that the judge would rule much of his evidence inadmissible, Earle attempted to drop the charges in order to regroup but the judge refused to allow it, instructing the jury to return a "not guilty" verdict so the charge could not be brought against her again.
- In 1995, Texas State Representative Betty Denton, a Democrat, pled guilty to misdemeanor charges of perjury. She received six months deferred adjudication and paid a $2,000 fine.
- In 1995, Lane Denton, a Democrat and the executive director of the Department of Public Safety Officers' Association was found guilty of second degree theft (a felony) and misapplication of fiduciary property. He was ordered to pay $67,201 in restitution along with a $12,000 fine. Additionally, he was sentenced to 10 years of probation, 60 days in jail, and 240 hours of community service.
- In 2000, Texas State Representative Gilbert Serna, a Democrat, pled guilty to multiple charges of theft by public servant. He was placed on probation for 10 years, was sentenced to 90 days in jail, and was required to pay a $3,000 fine along with restitution of more than $13,000.

=== Prosecution of Mike Martin ===
On July 31, 1981, during the First Called Session of the Sixty-seventh Texas Legislature, Republican Representative Mike Martin, a Republican then of Longview, was shot in the left arm outside his trailer in Austin with 00-buckshot. Soon after the shooting, unidentified spokespeople from Earle's office released information to the Austin American Statesman that they felt Martin was telling inconsistent stories to the police. They claimed he first said he had no idea who did it; later he said it was a Satanic cult; in the end, he accused his political enemies.

Martin responded to the leaks by saying he was asked to give police all possibilities and said he had no idea why the district attorney's office would be saying such things. Earle personally made a public announcement that Martin was cooperating with police and that no one from his office was releasing information saying otherwise to The Statesman. Earle formed a grand jury to look into the shooting of Martin and invited him to attend without issuing a subpoena.

Martin refused to appear by issuing a statement that he had already given officials all the information he knew. Gregg County District Attorney Rob Foster shortly arrested Martin on a three-year-old assault charge. The charge was immediately dismissed due to time limits and lack of evidence. Upon release, Martin appeared before reporters and accused Gregg County officials of using their offices to ruin him politically. The day after his release on the assault charge, Martin voluntarily appeared before Earle's grand jury.

At the time he didn't know that his first cousin, Charles Goff, had previously appeared before the grand jury and admitted helping Martin stage the event to advance Martin's political career. He claimed Martin offered him a state job as payment, despite Texas' strong nepotism laws forbidding the hiring of relatives. Goff had served prison time and had three outstanding felony warrants pending at the time of his testimony; however, the grand jury took his word over Martin's. After Martin's denial of Goff's accusations before the grand jury, Earle filed felony perjury charges against the freshman legislator. Martin pleaded not guilty and, a year later, worked out a plea bargain with Earle by admitting to misdemeanor perjury charges relating to the renting of a car around the time of the shooting. Martin resigned his House seat on April 22, 1982, and withdrew from the upcoming election. Martin filed several suits against Earle, Foster, and Goff for civil rights violations. A federal judge dismissed the last case in June 1985 on grounds that prosecutors enjoy qualified immunity from civil suits. Martin maintains his innocence regarding Earle's charges.

=== Investigation and prosecution of Tom DeLay ===
For over two years, Earle and eight separate grand juries investigated possible violations of Texas campaign finance law in the 2002 state legislative election. Earle denies that his pursuit of DeLay was part of a partisan "fishing expedition". His investigation of two political action committees that spent a combined $3.4 million on 22 Republican Texas House races focused on a political action committee founded by DeLay, Texans for a Republican Majority PAC. During the investigation, DeLay charged that Earle was a "runaway district attorney" with "a long history of being vindictive and partisan".

On September 28, 2005, a grand jury indicted DeLay for conspiring to violate Texas state election law. Texas prohibits corporate contributions in state legislative races. The indictment charged that Texans for a Republican Majority, DeLay's PAC, accepted corporate contributions, laundered the money through the Republican National Committee, and directed it to favored Republican candidates in Texas. The presiding judge in the case, Pat Priest, a Democrat, eventually threw out the charge and the Court of Criminals Appeals upheld this decision in 2007.

Earle's second attempt to secure indictments against DeLay failed. That grand jury returned a "no bill" due to insufficient evidence. The jury member questioned stated that Earle appeared visibly angry with the "no bill" decision.

Earle eventually received an indictment against DeLay from a third Austin grand jury that had been seated for a few hours. This indictment was on charges of conspiracy to launder money. DeLay's lawyers asserted the indictment was flawed legally, as laundered money is defined in the Texas Penal Code as money gained in the "proceeds of criminal activity". DeLay's defense stressed that corporate donations to political campaigns are a normal, legal business activity. Due to a House rule requiring a party leader to step down if indicted, the indictment required DeLay to resign as Majority Leader.

In a counter complaint, DeLay's attorney, Dick DeGuerin, filed a motion against DA Earle, charging him with prosecutorial misconduct in the DeLay indictment. DeGuerin sought court permission to depose grand jurors.

DeLay filed a motion for a change of venue from the Democratic stronghold of Travis County to Fort Bend County, where he resides. The motion was denied by Judge Priest and a trial date for October 2010 was set. On November 24, 2010, DeLay was convicted of money laundering. The conviction was overturned by the Third Court of Appeals for the State of Texas in September 2013. The court found that "there was no evidence that [the PAC] or RNSEC [the Republican National State Elections Committee] treated the corporate funds as anything but what they were, corporate funds with limited uses under campaign finance law." In its opinion, the court decided that "...the evidence shows that the defendants were attempting to comply with the Election Code limitations on corporate contributions." The court not only overturned the verdict, but took the step of entering a full acquittal.

=== Prosecution of LaCresha Murray ===
In 1996, Earle indicted 11-year-old LaCresha Murray for capital murder involving two-year-old Jayla Belton – the youngest homicide prosecution in Texas history. Earle's evidence rested on an alleged confession by Murray, obtained by interrogation at a children's shelter in the absence of any attorney or family member. Murray's case provoked several public protests of Earle's office and at the Texas State Capitol from her detention in 1996 until her release in 1999, when the case was reviewed.

Murray was again tried and convicted of intentional injury to a child, receiving a 25-year sentence. In 2001, the Texas Third Court of Appeals later reversed the verdict and remanded her sentence after discerning that her confession had been illegally obtained. Furthermore, a liver tissue examination by a pathologist expert in the field showed the injury was inflicted hours before and thus not by Murray. Clothes worn by the toddler had no blood traces which should have been present given the injuries — indicating the clothes were changed after the toddler was beaten.

Faced with the evidence Earle eventually dropped all charges against Murray. In 2002, a suit was filed against the Travis County District Attorney's Office and a host of other individuals and various agencies, which alleged the Murray family had been victimized by malicious prosecution, defamation, libel and slander, and had suffered mental anguish. Charges of racism were also raised in the suit, suggesting that the Murray family would have been treated differently had they been white. Murray's suit was dismissed. On November 28, 2005, the US Supreme Court refused to revive the lawsuit.

=== Prosecution of Maurice Pierce ===
On December 6, 1991, four teenage girls were murdered inside a local yogurt shop in Austin. In 1999, Earle led the "Yogurt Shop Murders" case against suspect Maurice Pierce, leading to a grand jury indicting him on four counts of first degree murder. Pierce was arrested, along with Robert Springsteen IV, Michael Scott, and Forrest Welborn, for the murders of four girls. Springsteen and Scott eventually confessed to the crime. Springsteen was convicted and sentenced to death. Scott was convicted and sentenced to life in prison.

Welborn was never indicted for the crime. Pierce continually maintained his innocence up until his release, occurring three years after his arrest. The state could not use Springsteen's and Scott's confessions against Pierce, so, without a confession, and only circumstantial evidence to connect him to the yogurt shop, the state had to either try Pierce or release him. Earle released him and dropped all charges citing a lack of evidence. The case against Pierce remains open. On December 24, 2010, Pierce was shot dead by Austin police officers in an incident during which Pierce allegedly stabbed a police officer with the officer's knife.

=== Retirement and 2008 election ===
In late 2007, Earle announced that he would not seek reelection to his post. His departure precipitated a race to fill his seat. Four Democrats, all employees of his office, ran for the seat. In the primary election held on March 4, 2008, no candidate received 50 percent of the vote. A runoff election was held between the top two finishers, and Rosemary Lehmberg – whom Earle had endorsed – won handily. She faced no Republican opponent in the general election. She took office in January 2009 and is the first woman district attorney in Travis County history.

== 2010 campaign for Lieutenant Governor ==
Immediately after Earle announced his retirement as District Attorney of Travis County in December 2007, he began being mentioned as a possible statewide candidate. In the spring of 2009, Earle's name began being mentioned specifically in context with a race for either Texas Attorney General or Texas Governor.

Earle said he was considering a run for one of the two posts. On June 30, 2009, an Internet draft movement, DraftRonnie.com, was launched to urge Earle to run for Texas governor. The Draft Ronnie website and draft movement ended in September 2009, when Democrat Hank Gilbert entered the race for Texas Governor. On December 18, 2009, Earle filed the necessary paperwork to run for Lieutenant Governor of Texas but was defeated in the Democratic primary by Linda Chavez-Thompson, a labor union activist. She, in turn, was defeated in the general election by the incumbent Republican David Dewhurst in November 2010.

== Personal life and death ==
Earle was married to his second wife, Twila Hugley Earle, for nearly three decades. With his first wife, Barbara Ann Leach Earle, he had two children, Elisabeth Ashlea Earle and Charles Jason Earle. He also had one stepdaughter, Nikki Leigh Rowling, and four grandchildren; Alexandra Clare Leissner, Avery Elise Leissner, Adelaide Clara Earle, and Elias Alistair Earle.

Earle retired in Austin and remained active in criminal justice reform efforts. He died in Austin, Texas, on April 5, 2020, from complications of COVID-19, exacerbated by a long illness. He was 78 years old.
