= Robert D. Perkins Sr. =

African-American civil rights activist

- Born: Robert Dean; August 11, 1922; Stuart, Florida, U.S.
- Died: April 19, 1994 (aged 71); Tallahassee, Florida, U.S.
- Education: Florida A&M University (BS)
- Occupation: Civil rights activist
- Spouse: Trudie Perkins
- Website: Official website

Robert Dean Perkins Sr. (August 11, 1922 – April 19, 1994) was an American educator, businessman and civil rights activist based in Tallahassee, Florida. Perkins and his wife, Trudie, are credited with being the catalysts for bringing about equitable changes in employment practices in municipal government at a time when no African-Americans held high-ranking positions in city administration. The result of their efforts was a consent decree, entered and ordered against the city of Tallahassee in 1975 mandating the hiring of African-Americans at a ratio equal to their population in the city at that time.

== Early life and education ==
Robert Perkins served in the U.S. Army, fought in World War II, and was honorably discharged in 1944. He would later meet Trudie Mae Chester while matriculating at Florida A&M University.

He graduated from Florida Agricultural and Mechanical University in 1947 with a degree in physics, auto mechanics, and mathematics, later teaching each of these subjects as a professor at both his alma mater and Florida State University.

Robert Perkins married Trudie Mae Chester on September 10, 1946. Their children were Robert Dean Perkins Jr., Romerio Dorianzo Perkins, Loretta Zelena Perkins Speed, Jacqueline Yvonne Perkins and Reginuer Demetre Perkins.

== Career ==
Robert and Trudie Perkins owned and operated Perkins Service Station and Beauty Shop, which was located on the corner of Osceola Street and Railroad Avenue (now Althea Gibson Way). Notably, they provided an array of services (at minimal cost or by extending credit) to Bond residents, as well as faculty, staff, and students at FAMU. Perkins Service Station was the only black-owned service station with three (3) gas pumps. They were able to provide ample levels of gas to residents participating in the Tallahassee bus boycott. A professor at both FAMU and Florida State University, Mr. Perkins also spent countless hours tutoring FAMU teaching assistants and students in math, chemistry, and other subjects. In his quest to facilitate learning gains, he would often extend assistance to students/faculty outside of the classroom. He tutored many of them at the service station as he repaired automobiles (late night) or at his own home.

During the early 1950s, Robert Perkins was one of the only black residents who advocated for the construction of recreational facilities for black youth. He persisted in his efforts for a protracted period. When it became apparent that this was not a priority for City of Tallahassee officials, Mr. Perkins and Mr. Charlie Jenkins loaded their vehicles with black youth and took them to play at recreation centers and parks in white neighborhoods. This action prompted the City to identify and allocate funding for construction of a recreation center for blacks. Soon thereafter, Jake Gaither Park and Recreation Center was constructed in 1954. During the early '60s, Mr. Perkins headed the Recreation Advisory Council and petitioned the City and Leon County Commissions to provide more funds, support, and manpower for expansion of the Negro recreation facilities in Tallahassee and throughout the County.

== Legacy ==
Mrs. Trudie Perkins was one of the first black nurses to be employed at Tallahassee Memorial HealthCare; she was relentless in her efforts to abolish discriminatory employment practices and fought against the harassment and mistreatment faced by black workers. Subsequent to the termination of Mrs. Perkins and her coworker Lizzie Smith, Robert Perkins prepared case files for and assisted 25 workers of the city-owned Tallahassee Memorial Hospital in filing complaints with the United States Department of Justice. He used his own time and personal financial resources to travel to Washington, D.C., where he met with members of Congress, including Senators Ted Kennedy, Edward Gurney and Birch Bayh. He presented evidence of racial discrimination in city employment practices, and ultimately, United States Attorney General William Saxbe agreed with Perkins. The U.S. Department of Justice (DOJ) used Mr. Perkins' files to prepare its case and persisted in filing a complaint against the city of Tallahassee in December 1974, alleging that the city had engaged in "a pattern and practice of discrimination" against blacks in job recruiting, hiring, assignments and promotions.

In April 1975, U.S. District Judge Winston Arnow handed down a decision in which he would monitor a formal "consent decree." Under terms of the consent decree, the city agreed to fill half of all vacancies with minority applicants until the long-term goal of 23.7% black representation had been achieved in eight separate job categories, especially in classifications that they had been excluded from (e.g., administrative; skilled craftsman; technician; professional; officials and administrators).

== Death ==
Perkins died on April 19, 1994, after an extended illness.

== Honors ==
On September 10, 2021, the City of Tallahassee, in conjunction with Leon County and Florida A&M University hosted a formal ceremony to rename Gamble Street in honor of Robert and Trudie Perkins. The street is now known as Robert and Trudie Perkins Way.
