= Bill Ceverha =

American politician

Member of the Texas House of Representatives from the 112th district
- In office January 11, 1983 – January 10, 1989
- Preceded by: District created
- Succeeded by: Fred Hill

Member of the Texas House of Representatives from the 33-P district
- In office January 11, 1977 – January 11, 1983
- Preceded by: Richard F. Reynolds
- Succeeded by: District abolished

Personal details
- Born: George William Ceverha; October 28, 1936 Chicago, Illinois
- Died: August 1, 2023 (aged 86) Dallas, Texas
- Party: Republican

Bill Ceverha (October 28, 1936 – August 1, 2023) was an American politician who served in the Texas House of Representatives from 1977 to 1989.

He died on August 1, 2023, in Dallas, Texas at age 86.
