= Texans for a Republican Majority =

Political action committee

Texans for a Republican Majority or TRMPAC (pronounced "trimpac") was a general-purpose political action committee registered with the Texas Ethics Commission to influence the state's legislative races. Founded in 2001 by former Republican Texas U.S. Rep. and House Majority Leader Tom DeLay, TRMPAC led to the first Republican majority in the Texas House of Representatives since the Reconstruction era, before folding due to legal challenges and the eventual political downfall of DeLay.

== History ==
TRMPAC was founded on September 5, 2001, with the goal of naming a Republican Speaker in Texas and promoting the Republican party's agenda within the state. John Colyandro was selected by Jim Ellis and Tom DeLay (R-Texas) to be executive director. Colyandro selected Dallas businessman and former state representative Bill Ceverha as treasurer.

The Texas Legislature is responsible for the state's congressional apportionment with redistricting usually taking place during the biennial legislative session that convenes following the decennial national census. DeLay, a powerful Congressman from suburban Houston nicknamed "The Hammer," sought to strengthen his congressional support base by increasing the size of the Texas Republican delegation. Following the successful TRMPAC effort to put Republicans in control of the Texas House, a lengthy redistricting effort ensued in 2003, and DeLay secured six more Republican seats for the Texas Congressional delegation in 2004.

== Lawsuit against TRMPAC ==
A lawsuit brought by five Democratic candidates against TRMPAC and Bill Ceverha as Treasurer resulted in a court order to pay $196,600 in damages and attorney fees. Ceverha later stated that the case had cost him in excess of $850,000. Ceverha subsequently filed for bankruptcy. The case against the other two parties named in the suit, John Colyandro and Jim Ellis has been stayed pending the outcome of criminal charges against them.

Ceverha was later criticized for refusing to reveal the amount of a gift received from GOP donor Bob Perry despite holding a state post requiring a description of gifts under the state ethics laws. Ceverha claimed that the disclosure law was satisfied by describing the gift as 'check'.

== Criminal charges ==
Several key members, lobbyists and officials associated with the organization were indicted by a grand jury for felony violations of state campaign finance laws such as applying corporate campaign contributions (which may be used only for administrative expenses) to political campaigns. In September 2002, TRMPAC donated $190,000 to the Republican National Committee, which within days sent $190,000 raised from individuals to seven GOP House candidates.

James W. Ellis, the committee's director, was indicted for money laundering in connection with this investigation. In addition, Americans for a Republican Majority head Jim Ellis and John Colyandro, former executive director of Texans for a Republican Majority, were both charged in September 2005 with violating Texas election law and criminal conspiracy to violate the election law.

Preston, Gates, Ellis & Rouvelas Meeds, reportedly lobbied for at least one donor to Texans for a Republican Majority, and also contributed $25,000 to TRMPAC itself. It has been reported that former DeLay aide Michael Scanlon worked on the Preston Gates account for the firm making the donation, Burlington Northern.

Warren Robold, a national Republican fundraiser who solicited money for TRMPAC from several of the indicted corporations, faced nine third-degree felony charges of 'making and accepting' prohibited corporate contributions.

Under Texas law, corporate donations may be used in state campaigns for administrative costs such as clerical needs or rent, but not for any purpose that might be used to influence voters.

== Films ==
- 2006 - The Big Buy: Tom DeLay's Stolen Congress. Directed by Mark Birnbaum and Jim Schermbeck.

== See also ==
- Americans for a Republican Majority
