= Pat Priest (judge) =

American judge from Tecas (1940–2018)

- Born: Wayne Patrick Priest; November 1940
- Died: October 12, 2018 (aged 77)
- Occupation: state court judge

Wayne Patrick "Pat" Priest (November 1940 – October 12, 2018) was a San Antonio, Texas state court judge who has presided over a number of nationally and regionally important cases.

== Tom DeLay campaign finance trial ==
As the senior District Judge of Bexar County (in semi-retired) status, he was appointed to preside over the Tom DeLay campaign finance trial in Austin, Texas by Chief Justice of Texas Supreme Court Wallace B. Jefferson after two judges (Administrative Judge B. B. Schraub and District Judge Bob Perkins) were recused in the case.

In January 2011, Priest sentenced DeLay to three years in prison. DeLay's conviction was overturned by the Texas 3rd Court of Appeals on September 19, 2013, which noted in part that "the jury on two occasions had asked trial Judge Pat Priest whether the $190,000 was 'illegal at the start of the transaction' or 'procured by illegal means originally,'" and that "the judge never answered the jurors' questions". The Court of Appeals was upheld by the Texas Supreme Court, and DeLay appellate attorney Brian Wice said afterwards that this was due in part to "Judge Pat Priest with his novel legal theory".

== Other cases ==
In 2015, Priest presided over the exoneration hearing of the "San Antonio Four", four women collectively accused and convicted of child molestation in 1994. Priest ultimately ruled that the women should be given a new trial, although he "refused to declare their 'actual innocence'". The Texas Court of Criminal Appeals exonerated them, asserting in plain but forceful language that they did not sexually assault anyone in 1994, for which they had spent years in prison.

Priest has presided over a wide range of murder cases.

Priest has used shock probation, releasing convicted criminals from prison shortly into their sentence with the expectation that the brief prison experience will be sufficient to rehabilitate the prisoner. His use of that methodology has drawn criticism and defenders.

== Personal life ==
Priest attended St. Mary's University Law School. He authored a criminal procedure casebook.
