= Tom DeLay =

American politician (born 1947)

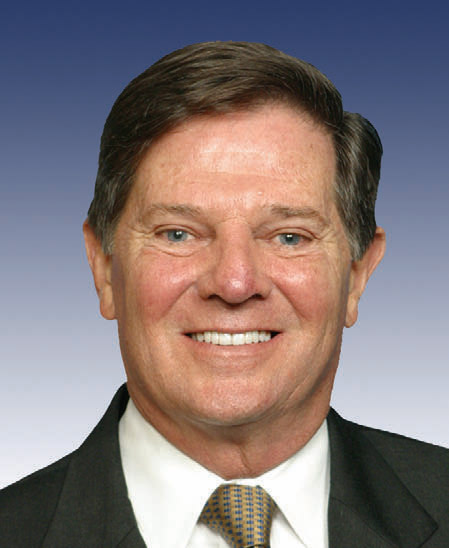

House Majority Leader
- In office January 3, 2003 – September 28, 2005
- Leader: Dennis Hastert
- Preceded by: Dick Armey
- Succeeded by: Roy Blunt (acting)

House Majority Whip
- In office January 3, 1995 – January 3, 2003
- Leader: Newt Gingrich; Dennis Hastert
- Preceded by: David Bonior
- Succeeded by: Roy Blunt

Secretary of the House Republican Conference
- In office January 3, 1993 – January 3, 1995
- Leader: Bob Michel
- Preceded by: Vin Weber
- Succeeded by: Barbara Vucanovich

Chair of the Republican Study Committee
- In office January 3, 1989 – January 3, 1993
- Preceded by: Phil Crane
- Succeeded by: Dan Burton

Member of the U.S. House of Representatives from Texas's 22nd district
- In office January 3, 1985 – June 9, 2006
- Preceded by: Ron Paul
- Succeeded by: Shelley Sekula-Gibbs

Member of the Texas House of Representatives
- In office January 9, 1979 – January 8, 1985
- Preceded by: Joe Hubenak
- Succeeded by: Jim Tallas
- Constituency: 21st district (1979–1983); 26th district (1983–1985)

Personal details
- Born: Thomas Dale DeLay; April 8, 1947 (age 79) Laredo, Texas, U.S.
- Party: Republican
- Spouse: Christine Furrh
- Children: 1
- Education: Baylor University; University of Houston (BS)
- DeLay's voice DeLay explaining the American Careers Initiative. Recorded May 11, 2004

Thomas Dale DeLay (/dəˈleɪ/; born April 8, 1947) is an American author and retired Republican Party politician who represented Texas's 22nd congressional district in the United States House of Representatives from 1985 until 2006. He served as House majority leader from 2003 to 2005.

DeLay began his political career in 1978 when he was elected to the Texas House of Representatives. He was first elected to the U.S. House of Representatives in 1984. In 1988, DeLay was appointed deputy minority whip. In 1994, he helped Newt Gingrich orchestrate the Republican Revolution, which swept Democrats from power in both houses of Congress and put Republicans in control of the House of Representatives for the first time in forty years. In 1995, DeLay was elected House majority whip. With the Republicans in control of both chambers in Congress, DeLay and conservative activist Grover Norquist helped start the K Street Project in an effort to advance Republican ideals. DeLay was elected House majority leader after the 2002 midterm elections. He was known as a staunch conservative during his years in Congress.

In 2005, a Travis County grand jury indicted DeLay on criminal charges of conspiracy to violate election law by campaign money laundering. DeLay temporarily resigned from his position as House majority leader and later announced that he would not seek to return. He resigned his seat in Congress in June 2006. DeLay was convicted in January 2011 and sentenced to three years in prison, but was free on bail while appealing his conviction. The trial court's judgment was overturned by the Austin Court of Appeals, a Texas intermediate appellate court, on September 19, 2013; the Court of Appeals ruled that "the evidence in the case was 'legally insufficient to sustain DeLay's convictions'", and acquitted DeLay. The acquittal was upheld on appeal.

After leaving Congress, DeLay co-authored a political memoir entitled No Retreat, No Surrender: One American's Fight. He also founded First Principles, LLC, a lobbying firm.

== Early life and education ==
DeLay was born in Laredo, Texas, one of three sons of Maxine Evelyn (née Wimbish) and Charles Ray DeLay. He spent most of his childhood in Venezuela due to his father's work in the petroleum and natural gas industry. He attended Calallen High School in Corpus Christi, Texas, where he both played football and was the lead dancer in school productions. He attended Baylor University for two years, majoring in pre-med, but was expelled for drinking and painting Baylor school colors on a building at rival Texas A&M University. The Washington Post reported that DeLay "received student draft deferments during the Vietnam era and avoided military service through the 1969 lottery". At the 1988 Republican Convention, he said that he could not volunteer to fight in Vietnam because so many minority youths had volunteered that there was literally no room for "patriotic folks" like himself.

DeLay graduated from the University of Houston in 1970 with a Bachelor of Science in biology.

== Early career ==
After graduating from college, DeLay spent three years at pesticide-maker Redwood Chemical and then purchased Albo Pest Control, which DeLay grew into a large and successful business. This work was the source for his nickname, "the Exterminator". In the 11 years DeLay ran the company, the Internal Revenue Service imposed three tax liens on him for failure to pay payroll and income taxes. The United States Environmental Protection Agency's ban on Mirex, a pesticide that was used in extermination work, led DeLay to oppose government regulation of businesses, a belief that he carried with him throughout his political career.

== Political career ==
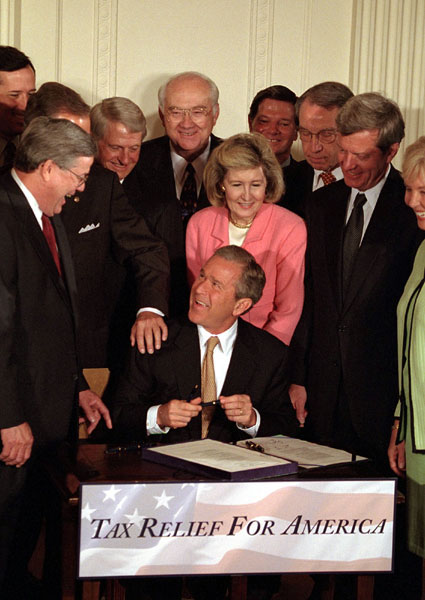
President Bush signing the Economic Growth and Tax Relief Reconciliation Act of 2001. DeLay is shown in the upper right of the photograph.

=== Local politics ===
In 1978, DeLay won the election for an open seat in the Texas House of Representatives. He was the first Republican to represent Fort Bend County in the state House. He was first sworn in on January 9, 1979, as a representative from the 21st district and served in the state House until 1985. DeLay ran for U.S. Congress in 1984 from the 22nd District, after fellow Republican Ron Paul decided to run in the Republican primary for the 1984 U.S. Senate race instead of for reelection (Paul subsequently returned to Congress from a neighboring district). He easily won a crowded six-way primary with 53 percent of the vote, and cruised to election in November. DeLay was one of six freshmen Republican congressmen elected from Texas in 1984 known as the Texas Six Pack. He was reelected 10 times, never facing substantive opposition in what had become a solidly Republican district.

=== Early congressional career ===
As a member of the Republican minority in the 1980s, DeLay made a name for himself by criticizing the National Endowment for the Arts and the Environmental Protection Agency. During his first term in Congress, DeLay was appointed to the Republican Committee on Committees, which assigned representatives to House committees, and in his second term, he was appointed to the powerful House Appropriations Committee, a position that he retained until his election as majority leader in 2003. He was reappointed to the committee in 2006 after leaving his position as majority leader. He also served for a time as chairman of a group of conservative House Republicans known as the Republican Study Committee, and as Secretary of the House Republican Conference. DeLay was appointed as a deputy Republican whip in 1988.

=== Majority whip ===
When the Republican Party gained control of the House in 1995 following the 1994 election, or "Republican Revolution", DeLay was elected Majority Whip against the wishes of House Speaker-elect Newt Gingrich.

DeLay was not always on good terms with Gingrich or Dick Armey, the House majority leader from 1995 to 2003, and he reportedly considered them uncommitted to Christian values. Nevertheless, in the heyday of the 104th Congress (1995–1997), DeLay described the Republican leadership as a triumvirate of Gingrich, "the visionary"; Armey, "the policy wonk"; and himself, "the ditch digger who makes it all happen".

In the summer of 1997, several House Republicans, who saw Speaker Newt Gingrich's public image as a liability, attempted to replace him as Speaker. The attempted "coup" began July 9 with a meeting between Republican conference chairman John Boehner of Ohio and Republican leadership chairman Bill Paxon of New York. According to their plan, House majority leader Dick Armey, House Majority Whip DeLay, Boehner and Paxon were to present Gingrich with an ultimatum: resign, or be voted out. However, Armey balked at the proposal to make Paxon the new Speaker, and told his chief of staff to warn Gingrich about the coup.

As Majority Whip, DeLay earned the nickname "The Hammer" for his enforcement of party discipline in close votes and his reputation for wreaking political vengeance on opponents. DeLay has expressed a liking for his nickname, pointing out that the hammer is one of a carpenter's most valuable tools. In the 104th Congress, DeLay successfully whipped 300 out of 303 bills.

In 1998, DeLay worked to ensure that the House vote on impeaching President Bill Clinton was successful. DeLay rejected efforts to censure Clinton, who, DeLay said, had lied under oath. DeLay posited that the U.S. Constitution allowed the House to punish the president only through impeachment. He called on Clinton to resign and influenced Republican House members to vote to approve articles of impeachment.

In 1998, Newt Gingrich faced a second major attempt by House Republicans, including DeLay, to oust him as Speaker. Gingrich announced he would decline to take his seat in the upcoming Congress. After Appropriations Committee chairman Bob Livingston and Dick Armey withdrew from consideration for the speakership, DeLay, as the third-ranking House Republican, had the inside track to the job. However, DeLay concluded that he would be "too nuclear" to lead the closely divided House that had resulted from the Republican House losses in 1996 and 1998. Instead, DeLay proposed his chief vote-counter, Chief Deputy Whip Dennis Hastert, as a compromise candidate, since Hastert had very good relations on both sides of the aisle. As Congress reconvened in January 1999, Hastert was elected House Speaker, and DeLay was reelected House Majority Whip.

=== Majority leader ===
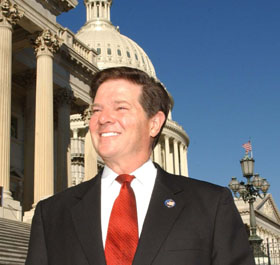
DeLay at the United States Capitol

After serving as his party's Whip for eight years, DeLay was elected majority leader upon the retirement of Dick Armey in 2003. His tenure as majority leader was marked by strong Republican party discipline and by parliamentary and redistricting efforts to preserve Republican control of the House. After his indictment on September 28, 2005, DeLay stepped down from his position as majority leader. He was the first congressional leader ever to be indicted. Rep. Roy Blunt of Missouri took over as acting leader.

On January 7, 2006, after weeks of growing pressure from Republican colleagues, and particularly from Reps. Charlie Bass and Jeff Flake, who wanted to avoid being associated with DeLay's legal issues in an election year, DeLay announced he would not seek to regain his position as majority leader.

==== Legislative and electoral methods ====
DeLay was known to "primary" Republicans who resisted his votes (i.e., to threaten to endorse and to support a Republican primary challenge to the disobedient representative).

In the 108th Congress, a preliminary Medicare vote passed 216–215, a vote on Head Start passed 217–216, a vote on school vouchers for Washington, D.C., passed 209–208, and "Fast track", usually called "trade promotion authority", passed by one vote as well. Both political supporters and opponents remarked on DeLay's ability to sway the votes of his party, a method DeLay described as "growing the vote". DeLay was noted for involving lobbyists in the process of passing House bills. One lobbyist said, "I've had members pull me aside and ask me to talk to another member of Congress about a bill or amendment, but I've never been asked to work on a bill—at least like they are asking us to whip bills now." His ability to raise money gave him additional influence. During the 2004 election cycle, DeLay's political action committee ARMPAC was one of the top contributors to Republican congressional candidates, contributing over $980,000 in total.

Partly as a result of DeLay's management abilities, the House Republican caucus under him displayed unprecedented, sustained party cohesion.

On September 30, 2004, the House Ethics Committee unanimously admonished DeLay because he "offered to endorse Representative Nick Smith's son in exchange for Representative Smith's vote in favor of the Medicare bill."

== Legal and ethical issues ==
=== Campaign finance charges ===
Following official admonishments by the United States House Committee on Ethics, DeLay was charged in 2005 with money laundering and conspiracy charges related to illegal campaign finance activities aimed at helping Republican candidates for Texas state office in the 2002 elections. The indictment was sought by Ronnie Earle, the Democratic former District Attorney of Travis County (which includes the state capital of Austin). A first grand jury rejected Earle's indictment attempt, but a second grand jury issued an indictment for one count of criminal conspiracy on September 28, 2005. On October 3, a third grand jury indicted DeLay for the more serious offense of money laundering.

An arrest warrant was issued on October 19, 2005, and DeLay turned himself in the next day to the Harris County Sheriff's Office in Houston. In accordance with House Republican Conference rules, DeLay temporarily resigned from his position as House majority leader. On January 7, 2006, after pressure from fellow Republicans, he announced that he would not seek to return to the post. On June 9, 2006, he resigned from Congress.

After two judges recused themselves, the Chief Justice of the Texas Supreme Court assigned Senior District Judge Pat Priest to preside over the trial.

DeLay moved to dismiss all charges. Judge Priest dismissed one count of the indictment alleging conspiracy to violate election law but allowed the other, more serious charges of money laundering and conspiracy to engage in money laundering to proceed. He also refused to allow a change of venue from Travis County, which the defense argued could not be the site of an impartial trial, to Fort Bend County, in which DeLay resided. The trial began on October 26, 2010, in Austin.

==== Conviction ====
On November 24, 2010, DeLay was found guilty by a Travis County jury on both counts. The range of possible sentences was probation to between 5 and 99 years in prison and up to $20,000 in fines, though the judge could have chosen probation. On January 10, 2011, after a sentencing hearing, the judge sentenced DeLay to three years in prison on the charge of conspiring to launder corporate money into political donations. On the charge of money laundering, he was sentenced to five years in prison, but that was probated for 10 years, meaning DeLay would serve 10 years' probation. Dick DeGuerin was DeLay's defense attorney.

==== Appeal and acquittal ====
DeLay appealed his conviction to the Texas Court of Appeals for the Third District at Austin, which heard oral arguments on October 10, 2012. On September 19, 2013, a ruling by the Court of Appeals overturned his convictions and entered an acquittal. Justice Melissa Goodwin wrote in the majority opinion that

Rather than supporting an agreement to violate the election code, the evidence shows that the defendants were attempting to comply with the Election Code limitations on corporate contributions.

She was joined in the opinion by visiting Justice David Galtney. Chief Justice J. Woodfin Jones dissented, writing, "I disagree with the majority's conclusion that there was legally insufficient evidence to support a jury finding that the corporate contributions at issue here were the proceeds of criminal activity." The Texas Court of Criminal Appeals granted the prosecution's petition for discretionary review on March 19, 2013, agreeing to review the decision of the Texas Court of Appeals Third District.

The Texas Court of Criminal Appeals ruled, 8-1, to affirm the lower courts' dismissal on October 1, 2014.

=== Contributions from Russian oil executives ===
In December 2005, the Washington Post reported that, in 1998, a group of Russian oil executives had given money to a nonprofit advocacy group run by a former DeLay staffer and funded by clients of lobbyist Jack Abramoff, in an attempt to influence DeLay's vote on an International Monetary Fund bailout of the Russian economy. Associates of DeLay adviser Ed Buckham, the founder of the U.S. Family Network, said that executives from the oil firm Naftasib had offered a donation of $1,000,000 to be delivered to a Washington, D.C.-area airport to secure DeLay's support. On June 25, 1998, the U.S. Family Network received a $1 million check via money transferred through the London law firm James & Sarch Co. This payment was the largest single entry on U.S. Family Network's donor list. The original source of the donation was not recorded. DeLay denied the payment had influenced his vote. Naftasib denied it had made the payment and that it had ever been represented by James & Sarch Co. The now-dissolved law firm's former partners declined to comment due to "confidentiality requirements".

=== The K Street Project ===
DeLay's involvement with the lobbying industry included a pointed effort on the part of the Republican Party to parlay the Congressional majority into dominance of K Street, the lobbying district of Washington, D.C. DeLay, Senator Rick Santorum, and Grover Norquist launched a campaign in 1995 encouraging lobbying firms to retain only Republican officials in top positions. Firms that had Democrats in positions of authority, DeLay suggested, would not be granted the ear of majority party members. In 1999, DeLay was privately reprimanded by the House Ethics Committee after he pulled an intellectual property rights bill off the House floor when the Electronic Industries Alliance (EIA) hired a former Democratic Congressman, Dave McCurdy. Firms initially responded to the campaign, but it waned during 2004, when the possibility of Senator John Kerry's winning the presidency gave lobbying firms some incentive to hire Democrats.

=== Cuban cigar photo ===
DeLay has long been a strong critic of Cuban leader Fidel Castro's regime, which DeLay has called a "thugocracy", and a supporter of the U.S. trade embargo against Cuba. However, in April 2005, Time Magazine published a photo from a government-funded July 2003 trip to Israel, in which DeLay is seen smoking a Cuban cigar. The consumption or purchase of Cuban cigars was illegal in the United States at the time (but was legal for U.S. citizens abroad). In September 2004, the U.S. Treasury Department's enforcement of the law toughened it to forbid consumption (smoking) or purchase of Cuban cigars by U.S. citizens anywhere in the world, but this ban was partially lifted by President Obama in October 2016.

=== Ethics admonishment for misuse of federal agency resources ===
During the controversial mid-decade redistricting plan in Texas, several Democratic members of the Texas House of Representatives went to Oklahoma to prevent the House from establishing a quorum of members, thereby preventing the House from acting on any legislation, including a proposed redistricting plan. Although not a member of the Texas legislature, DeLay became involved, by contacting several federal agencies in order to determine the location of the missing legislators. DeLay's staff contacted the Federal Aviation Administration (FAA) for assistance in tracking down a plane that one of the legislators was flying to Oklahoma, an action that the FAA believed to be a result of safety concerns about the aircraft. A review by the U.S. Department of Transportation found that a total of thirteen FAA employees spent more than eight hours searching for the airplane.

Members of DeLay's staff asked the FBI to arrest the missing Democrats but a Justice Department official dismissed DeLay's and his staff's request as "wacko". DeLay also contacted United States Marshal and United States Attorney's offices in Texas, as well as the Air and Marine Interdiction Coordination Center, an agency that deals with smuggling and terrorism. U.S. senator Joseph Lieberman (I-Connecticut) requested an investigation into DeLay's involvement in the requests, and asked that any White House involvement be reported. The House Ethics Committee admonished DeLay for improper use of FAA resources, and for involving federal agencies in a matter that should have been resolved by Texas authorities.

=== Civil lawsuit ===
In early 1999, The New Republic picked up a story, first reported by Houston-area alternative weeklies, alleging that DeLay had committed perjury during a civil lawsuit brought against him by a former business partner in 1994.

The plaintiff in that suit, Robert Blankenship, charged that DeLay and a third partner in Albo Pest Control had breached the partnership agreement by trying to force him out of the business without buying him out. Blankenship filed suit, charging DeLay and the other partner with breach of fiduciary duty, fraud, wrongful termination, and loss of corporate expectancy. While being deposed in that suit, DeLay claimed that he did not think that he was an officer or director of Albo and that he believed that he had resigned two or three years previously. However, his congressional disclosure forms, including one filed subsequent to the deposition, stated that he was either president or chairman of the company between 1985 and 1994. Blankenship also alleged that Albo money had been spent on DeLay's congressional campaigns, in violation of federal and state law. DeLay and Blankenship settled for an undisclosed sum. Blankenship's attorney said that had he known about the congressional disclosure forms, he would have referred the case to the Harris County district attorney's office for a perjury prosecution.

=== Jack Abramoff scandal ===
DeLay was the target of the Justice Department investigation into Republican lobbyist Jack Abramoff's actions. Abramoff allegedly provided DeLay with trips, gifts, and political donations in exchange for favors to Abramoff's lobbying clients, which included the government of the U.S. Commonwealth of the Northern Mariana Islands, Internet gambling services, and several Native American tribes. Two of DeLay's former political aides, Tony Rudy and Michael Scanlon, as well as Abramoff himself, pleaded guilty in 2006 to charges relating to the investigation. Political columnist Robert Novak reported that Abramoff "has no derogatory information about former House majority leader Tom DeLay and is not implicating him as part of his plea bargain with federal prosecutors."

According to ABC's 20/20 television program and NPR, Abramoff lobbied DeLay to stop legislation banning sex shops and sweatshops that forced employees to have abortions in the Northern Mariana Islands when Abramoff accompanied DeLay on a 1997 trip to the U.S. commonwealth. While on the trip, DeLay promised not to put the bill on the legislative calendar.

In 2000, the U.S. Senate unanimously passed a worker reform bill to extend the protection of U.S. labor and minimum-wage laws to the workers in the Northern Mariana Islands. DeLay, the House Republican Whip, stopped the House from considering the bill. DeLay later blocked a fact-finding mission planned by Rep. Peter Hoekstra (R-MI) by threatening him with the loss of his subcommittee chairmanship.

DeLay received gifts from Abramoff, including paid golfing holidays to Scotland, concert tickets, and the use of Abramoff's private skyboxes for fundraisers. In May 2000, ARMPAC received the free use of one of Abramoff's private skyboxes to host a political fundraiser. At the time, campaign finance laws did not require the use of the skybox, valued at several thousand dollars, to be disclosed or for Abramoff to be reimbursed for its use.

Later that month, the DeLays, Rudy, another aide, and Abramoff took a trip to London and Scotland. Abramoff paid for the airfare for the trip, and lobbyist Ed Buckham paid for expenses at a hotel at St. Andrews golf course in Scotland. Abramoff was reimbursed by The National Center for Public Policy Research, the nonprofit organization that arranged the trip. On the day that the trip began, The National Center received large donations from two of Abramoff's clients, internet lottery service eLottery, Inc., and the Mississippi Band of Choctaw Indians. Both organizations denied that they had intended to pay for DeLay's trip.

House rules forbid members to accept travel expenses from lobbyists, and require that members inquire into the sources of funds that nonprofits use to pay for trips. DeLay denied knowing that lobbyists had paid for travel expenses. In July 2000, DeLay voted against a bill that would have restricted Internet gambling. Both eLottery and the Choctaws opposed the bill. Rudy, who was then DeLay's deputy chief of staff, doomed the bill by engineering a parliamentary maneuver that required a two-thirds majority vote, rather than a simple majority, for the bill to pass. Rudy's actions on behalf of Abramoff's clients during this time were mentioned in Abramoff's guilty plea in January 2006.

In January 2006, The Associated Press reported that in 2001, DeLay co-signed a letter to U.S. Attorney General John Ashcroft calling for the closure of a casino owned by the Alabama-Coushatta Tribe of Texas. Two weeks earlier, the Choctaws had donated $1,000 to DeLay's Texans for a Republican Majority PAC (TRMPAC). A DeLay spokesman denied that the donations had influenced DeLay's actions. Currently, and at the time of the letter, casinos or other private gambling establishments are illegal in Texas, even on Indian reservations.

Scanlon, who became Abramoff's lobbying partner, pleaded guilty in November 2005 to conspiracy charges. Abramoff pleaded guilty to fraud, tax evasion, and conspiracy charges on January 3, 2006, and agreed to cooperate with the government's investigation. His cooperation may have forced DeLay to abandon his efforts to return to his position as House majority leader, a decision DeLay announced only a few days after Abramoff's plea bargain. Rudy pleaded guilty on March 31, 2006, to illegally acting on Abramoff's behalf in exchange for gifts. Abramoff referred clients to Ed Buckham's Alexander Strategy Group (ASG), a lobbying firm. In addition, Abramoff clients gave more than $1.5 million to Buckham's U.S. Family Network, which then paid ASG more than $1 million.

From 1998–2002, ASG paid Christine DeLay (Tom DeLay's wife) a monthly salary averaging between $3,200 and $3,400. DeLay's attorney, Richard Cullen, initially said the payments were for telephone calls she made periodically to the offices of certain members of Congress seeking the names of their favorite charities, and that she then forwarded that information to Buckham, along with some information about those charities. In early June 2006, Cullen said the payments were also for general political consulting she provided to her husband. In all, Christine DeLay was paid about $115,000 directly by ASG, and got another $25,000 via money put into a retirement account by the firm. Her work with ASG has been the subject of an inquiry by the Department of Justice.

In August 2010, the government ended a six-year investigation of his ties to Abramoff, according to DeLay's lead counsel in the matter, Richard Cullen. A state case continued in Texas.

== Political positions ==
=== Domestic policy ===
On economic policy, DeLay was rated 95 out of 100 by Americans for Tax Reform, a conservative anti-tax group, and 95 to 100 by the U.S. Chamber of Commerce, a pro-business lobby. He received the lowest possible score of 0% from the AFL–CIO, the nation's largest organization of labor unions.

On environmental policy, he earned ratings of zero from the Sierra Club and League of Conservation Voters. He has been a fervent critic of the Environmental Protection Agency, which he has called the "Gestapo of government".

In the politics of guns, DeLay firmly came down on the side of gun owners rights, loosening gun control laws and opposing stricter controls. He received an "A+" grade from the NRA Political Victory Fund, the nation's largest pro-gun rights lobby.

The American Civil Liberties Union measured that his voting history aligned with their civil liberties platform 0% of the time.

On the issue of immigration, DeLay received the highest possible score of 100% from the Federation for American Immigration Reform (FAIR), an organization that seeks to restrict immigration.

DeLay opposed abortion rights. In 2005, he voted 100% in line with the views of the National Right to Life Committee and 0% with the National Abortion Reproductive Rights Action League.

DeLay opposes the teaching of evolution. After the Columbine High School massacre in 1999, he entered into the Congressional Record a statement saying that shootings happened in part "because our school systems teach our children that they are nothing but glorified apes who have evolutionized [sic] out of some primordial soup of mud."

In 2001, DeLay refused to increase the Earned Income Credit (EIC) tax credit, thereby defying President George W. Bush, during the congressional battle over Bush's tax cuts for people making between $10,500 and $26,625 a year; when reporters asked DeLay about what he would do about increasing the EIC, DeLay simply stated, "[It] ain't going to happen." When Bush's press secretary Ari Fleischer reiterated the president's desire for a low-income tax cut, DeLay retorted, "The last time I checked they [the executive branch] don't have a vote."

In 2003, DeLay blamed Senate Democrats and what he called "BANANA (Build Absolutely Nothing Anywhere Near Anything) environmentalists" for blocking legislative solutions to problems such as the 2003 North America blackout.

DeLay maintained public silence on Houston's 2003 METRORail light rail initiative, though in the past, he had opposed expanding light rail to Houston. Public filings later showed that DeLay had his Americans for a Republican Majority Political Action Committee (ARMPAC) and his congressional campaign committee sent money to Texans for True Mobility, an organization that advocated against the initiative. The proposal passed by a slim margin. Despite his earlier opposition, following the passage of the initiative, DeLay helped to obtain funding for the light rail program.

In 2004, the House Ethics Committee unanimously admonished DeLay for his actions related to a 2002 energy bill. A Committee memo stated that DeLay "created the appearance that donors were being provided with special access to Representative DeLay regarding the then-pending energy legislation."

In 2005, DeLay, acting against the president's wishes, initiated the "safe harbor" provision for MTBE in the Energy Policy Act of 2005, together with Rep. Joe Barton.

DeLay supported the Bankruptcy Abuse Prevention and Consumer Protection Act of 2005. Critics of the legislation argued that it unduly favored creditors over consumers, noting that the credit card industry spent millions of dollars lobbying in support of the act. The bill passed Congress.

==== Terri Schiavo ====
DeLay called the Terri Schiavo case "one of my proudest moments in Congress". DeLay made headlines for his role in helping lead federal intervention in the matter. On Palm Sunday weekend in March 2005, several days after the brain-damaged Florida woman's feeding tube was disconnected for the third time, the House met in emergency session to pass a bill allowing Schiavo's parents to petition a federal judge to review the removal of the feeding tube. DeLay called the removal of the feeding tube "an act of barbarism". DeLay faced accusations of hypocrisy from critics when the Los Angeles Times revealed that he had consented to ending life support for his father, who had been in a comatose state because of a debilitating accident in 1988.

DeLay was accused of endorsing violence in the wake of a series of high-profile violent crimes and death threats against judges when he said, "The men responsible [for Terri Schiavo's death] will have to answer to their behavior". DeLay's comments came soon after the February 28, 2005, homicide of the mother and husband of Chicago Judge Joan Lefkow, and the March 11, 2005, killing of Atlanta Judge Rowland Barnes. DeLay's opponents accused him of rationalizing violence against judges when their decisions were unpopular with the public. Ralph Neas, President of People for the American Way, said that DeLay's comments were "irresponsible and could be seen by some as justifying inexcusable conduct against our courts".

=== Foreign policy ===
DeLay has been a strong supporter of the State of Israel, saying, "The Republican leadership, especially that leadership in the House, has made pro-Israel policy a fundamental component of our foreign policy agenda and it drives the Democrat [sic] leadership crazy—because they just can't figure out why we do it!" In a 2002 speech, DeLay promised to "use every tool at my disposal to ensure that the Republican Conference, and the House of Representatives, continues to preserve and strengthen America's alliance with the State of Israel."

On a 2003 trip to Israel, DeLay toured the nation and addressed members of the Knesset. His opposition to land concessions is so strong that Aryeh Eldad, the deputy of Israel's conservative National Union party, remarked, "As I shook his hand, I told Tom DeLay that until I heard him speak, I thought I was farthest to the right in the Knesset." Former Mossad chief Danny Yatom said "The Likud is nothing compared to this guy."

In 2005, in a snub to the Bush administration, DeLay was the "driving force behind the rejection of direct aid" to the Palestinian Authority. The deal had been brokered by the American Israel Public Affairs Committee. In the wake of the legislation, some Jewish leaders expressed concern "about the degree to which the Texas Republican, an evangelical Christian who opposes the creation of a Palestinian state, will go to undercut American and Israeli attempts to achieve a two-state solution."

== Electoral history ==
Texas's 22nd congressional district Results 1984–2004
Year	Republican	Votes	Pct	Democratic	Votes	Pct	3rd party	Votes	Pct	4th party	Votes	Pct
1984	Tom DeLay	125,225	66.4%	Doug Williams	66,495	33.7%						
1986	Tom DeLay	76,459	71.8%	Susan Director	30,079	28.2%						
1988	Tom DeLay	125,733	67.2%	Wayne Walker	58,471	31.3%	George Harper	2,276	1.2%			
1998	Tom DeLay	87,840	65.2%	Hill Kemp	45,386	33.7%	Steve Grupe	1,494	1.1%			
2000	Tom DeLay		66%	Hill Kemp		34%						
2002	Tom DeLay		63.2%	Tim Riley		35.0%	Joel West		0.8%	Jerry LaFleur		1.0%
2004	Tom DeLay	150,386	55.2%	Richard R. Morrison	112,034	41.1%	Michael Fjetland	5,314	1.948%	Tom Morrison	4,886	1.8%

== Life after Congress ==
Since leaving Congress, along with tending to his legal troubles, DeLay has co-authored (with Stephen Mansfield) a political memoir, No Retreat, No Surrender: One American's Fight, given media interviews (primarily regarding politics), begun a personal blog, opened an official Facebook page (written in the third-person), become active on Twitter (written in the first-person), and appeared on the ninth season of Dancing with the Stars, the highly watched ABC television reality show.

DeLay ascribes divine motivation to his political efforts since leaving Congress, telling an interviewer: "I listen to God, and what I've heard is that I'm supposed to devote myself to rebuilding the conservative base of the Republican Party, and I think we shouldn't be underestimated."

DeLay's website concludes by saying that the former congressman and his wife "continue to be outspoken advocates for foster care reform and are actively involved in a unique foster care community in Richmond, Texas, that provides safe, permanent homes for abused and neglected kids." Rio Bend, a "Christ-centered" community which the DeLays founded, opened in 2005.

=== Blog and book ===
On December 10, 2006, DeLay launched a personal blog. After joining Dancing with the Stars in August 2008, DeLay scrubbed his personal website of most of its political content and rebranded it as "Dancing with DeLay."

In March 2007, DeLay published No Retreat, No Surrender: One American's Fight, co-authored with Stephen Mansfield. The book's foreword is by Rush Limbaugh; the preface, by Sean Hannity. The book contains controversial claims, including DeLay's assertion as fact the claim that the Clinton Administration had sought to have military uniforms banned from the White House, which has been repeatedly proven false.

=== Dancing with the Stars ===
DeLay was a participant on the ninth season of Dancing with the Stars, a reality-TV dance competition show in which celebrities such as DeLay are paired with professional dancers. DeLay's dance partner-instructor was Cheryl Burke, a two-time champion on the highly watched ABC television show. DeLay is the second former politician to compete on the show, following the former mayor of Cincinnati (1977–78), season three's Jerry Springer, better known as host of the tabloid television talk show The Jerry Springer Show.

=== Discussion of "birther" conspiracy theory ===
On August 19, 2009, DeLay, making the rounds of various media shows in order to promote his upcoming participation in season nine of Dancing with the Stars, was interviewed by Chris Matthews of Hardball, a political news and talk show on MSNBC. DeLay made political news, when, during the interview, he became the most famous Republican yet to give voice to the so-called birther conspiracy theory about President Barack Obama. During his appearance on Hardball, when pressed by Matthews as to whether he supported the conspiracy theory and its adherents and proponents, including several Republican members of Congress, DeLay said, "I would like the president to produce his birth certificate.... I can, most illegal aliens here in America can. Why can't the president of the United States produce a birth certificate?... Chris, the Constitution of the United States specifically says you have to be a 'natural-born citizen' [to be eligible to serve as president]."

== Personal life ==
DeLay married Christine Furrh, whom he had known since high school, in 1967. In 1972, the DeLays had a daughter, Danielle, who became a public school math teacher. Christine DeLay died on April 27, 2024.

During his time in the Texas Legislature, DeLay struggled with alcoholism and gained a reputation as a playboy, earning the nickname "Hot Tub Tom". By the time of his election to Congress in 1984, he was drinking "eight, ten, twelve martinis a night at receptions and fundraisers." In 1985, DeLay became a born-again Christian, and gave up hard liquor. Of the Rev. Ken Wilde, an evangelical minister from Idaho who founded the National Prayer Center in Washington, D.C., which houses volunteers who come to the capital to pray for the nation's leaders, DeLay said, "This is the man who really saved me. When I was going through my troubles, it was Ken who really stepped up." Of his conversion, he said, "I had put my needs first ... I was on the throne, not God. I had pushed God from His throne."

In criticizing Newt Gingrich for secretly having an affair with a staffer while Gingrich, as House Speaker, was simultaneously impeaching President Bill Clinton for lying under oath about his affair with White House intern Monica Lewinsky, DeLay said, "I don't think that Newt could set a high moral standard, a high moral tone, during that moment.... You can't do that if you're keeping secrets about your own adulterous affairs".

Differentiating between Gingrich's adultery and his own admitted adultery, DeLay said, "I was no longer committing adultery by that time, the impeachment trial. There's a big difference. ... I had returned to Christ and repented my sins by that time."

DeLay declined to comment on a 1999 report in The New Yorker that he was estranged from much of his family, including his mother and one of his brothers. As of 2001, he had not spoken to his younger brother, Randy, a Houston lobbyist, since 1996, when a complaint to the House Ethics Committee prompted DeLay to state that he had cut his brother off in order to avoid the appearance of a conflict of interest.

== See also ==
- List of federal political scandals in the United States

U.S. House of Representatives
Preceded by Ron Paul	Member of the U.S. House of Representatives from Texas's 22nd congressional district 1985–2006	Succeeded by Shelley Sekula-Gibbs
Preceded by David Bonior	House Majority Whip; 1995–2003	Succeeded by Roy Blunt
Preceded by Dick Armey	House Majority Leader; 2003–2005	Succeeded by Roy Blunt; Acting
Party political offices
Preceded by Phil Crane	Chair of the Republican Study Committee; 1989–1993	Succeeded by Dan Burton
Preceded by Vin Weber	Secretary of the House Republican Conference; 1993–1995	Succeeded by Barbara Vucanovich
Preceded by Dick Armey	House Republican Deputy Leader; 2003–2005	Succeeded by Roy Blunt; Acting
U.S. order of precedence (ceremonial)
Preceded by Dick Armey as Former House Majority Leader	Order of precedence of the United States as Former House Majority Leader	Succeeded by Eric Cantor as Former House Majority Leader
