= CSF =

CSF may refer to:

== Biology and medicine ==
- Cerebrospinal fluid, clear colorless bodily fluid found in the brain and spine
- Colony-stimulating factor, secreted glycoproteins
  - Macrophage colony-stimulating factor, "CSF-1"
  - Granulocyte-macrophage colony-stimulating factor, "CSF-2"
  - Granulocyte colony-stimulating factor, "CSF-3"
- Cancer slope factor, estimate the risk of cancer
- Classical swine fever, contagious disease of pigs
- Contrast sensitivity function, relationship of contrast threshold vs angular frequency for an observer

== Military ==
- Central Security Forces (CSF), an Egyptian paramilitary force
- Comprehensive Soldier Fitness
- Coalition Support Fund, US military aid to countries
- Thomson-CSF of Thales Group

== Education ==
- California Scholarship Federation
- California State University, Fullerton, a university in Southern California
- Collège de la Sainte Famille, a Jesuit school in Cairo, Egypt
- Colorado Shakespeare Festival, a Shakespeare Festival each summer at the University of Colorado at Boulder
- College of Santa Fe, a private art centric college in Santa Fe New Mexico
- Conseil scolaire francophone de la Colombie-Britannique, a public school board in British Columbia, Canada
- Christian Student Fellowship, a Christian campus ministry at the University of Kentucky in Lexington, Kentucky
- Christian Socialist Fellowship, Protestant organization
- Curriculum and Standards Framework

== Computing ==
- NIST Cybersecurity Framework

== Sport ==
- CONMEBOL or CSF (Confederación Sudamericana de Fútbol)
- CSF CFR Timișoara, a Romanian amateur association football club
- CSF Group-Navigare, an Irish professional cycling team

== Other uses ==
- Caesium fluoride (cesium fluoride), a chemical compound
- Capsize screening formula
- Catholic Secular Forum of Mumbai, India
- Commercial Spaceflight Federation, a non-profit trade association of businesses and organizations working to make commercial human spaceflight a reality
- Community of St. Francis. an Anglican Order of nuns
- Compagnie générale de la télégraphie sans fil, a French telecommunications company
- China Securities Finance, a Chinese quasi-central bank for brokerage firms
- Community-supported fishery
- Configuration state function
- Critical success factor
- Crowd-sourced funding
