= Ericson 23 =

Ericson 23 may refer to:

- Ericson 23-1 a 1969 American sailboat design
- Ericson 23-2 a 1975 American sailboat design
