= List of Dagashi Kashi episodes =

Episodes of Japanese anime television series

Dagashi Kashi is an anime television series based on Kotoyama's manga series of the same name. The first season aired from January 7 to March 31, 2016. It was produced by Feel and directed by Shigehito Takayanagi, who also handled series composition together with Yasuko Kamo. Kanetoshi Kamimoto was in charge of character design, and Satoshi Motoyama was the series' sound director. The first season's opening theme song is "Checkmate!?" performed by Michi, while the ending theme song is "Hey! Calorie Queen" (Hey!カロリーQueen) performed by Ayana Taketatsu.

A second season, marketed as Dagashi Kashi 2, aired from January 12 to March 30, 2018, with Tezuka Productions taking over production and Feel instead being credited for setting cooperation. While Motoyama returned as sound director, several other duties were taken over by new staff: for the second season, Satoshi Kuwabara was in charge of direction, Mayumi Morita handled series composition, and Nana Miura designed the characters. The second season's opening theme song is "Oh My Sugar Feeling!!" (OH MY シュガーフィーリング!!) performed by Taketatsu, while the ending theme song is "Okashina Watashi to Hachimitsu no Kimi" (おかしなわたしとはちみつのきみ; lit. 'The Candied Me and the Honeyed You') performed by Hachimitsu Rocket.

== Series overview ==
Season	Episodes	Originally released	
Season	Episodes	First released	Last released
1	12	January 7, 2016	March 31, 2016
2	12	January 12, 2018	March 30, 2018

== Episodes ==
=== Season 1 (2016) ===
No. overall	No. in season	Title	Directed by	Written by	Chief animation directed by	Original release date
1	1	"Umaibō, Fries, and..." Transliteration: "Umaibō to Potefu to..." (Japanese: うまい棒とポテフと…)	Shigehito Takayanagi	Yasuko Kamo	Kanetoshi Kamimoto	January 7, 2016
1	1	"Coffee Milk Candies, Young Donuts and..." Transliteration: "Kōhī Gyūnyū Kyandī to Yangu Dōnatsu to..." (Japanese: コーヒー牛乳キャンディとヤングドーナツと…)	Shigehito Takayanagi	Yasuko Kamo	Kanetoshi Kamimoto	January 7, 2016
Kokonotsu Shikada wants to be a manga artist, but his father Yō forces him to inherit the family's dagashi shop. At that time, a beautiful and eccentric girl named Hotaru Shidare comes to their home and asks Yō to work at her family's candy developer. Yō refuses because he couldn't leave the shop if Kokonotsu doesn't want to inherit the shop. Thus, Hotaru decided to stay until Kokonotsu agreed to inherit the shop. Later, Kokonotsu meets the Endō twins - Tō and Saya - at their cafe and tells them about Hotaru without mentioning her name. Saya later meets Hotaru in person without knowing she's the one that Kokonotsu mentioned earlier.
2	2	"Kinako-bou, Namaiki Beer, and..." Transliteration: "Kinako-bō to Namaiki Bīru to..." (Japanese: きなこ棒と生いきビールと…)	Directed by : Takafumi Fujii; Storyboarded by : Shigehito Takayanagi	Yasuko Kamo	Kanetoshi Kamimoto	January 14, 2016
2	2	"Fue Ramune, Menko, and..." Transliteration: "Fue Ramune to Menko to..." (Japanese: フエラムネとめんこと…)	Directed by : Takafumi Fujii; Storyboarded by : Shigehito Takayanagi	Yasuko Kamo	Kanetoshi Kamimoto	January 14, 2016
Hotaru arrives at the Shikada shop (san Yō) and continues her eccentric and sexually oblivious sweets-related behavior, culminating with her passing out from drinking a non-alcoholic candy beer mix. Kokonotsu later meets with Saya and Hotaru meets up with them while playing with candy that can also function as a whistle. She then spins a tale relating to the snack; Saya believes it is nonsense, but Kokonotsu catches on that it is allegorical and also implies that Hotaru's ditzy antics may not be completely sincere. Saya defuses the situation when she imagines all the sweets she could get for free if Kokonotsu were to succeed the shop. The three then play Menko into the evening as Saya stuns both Kokonotsu and Hotaru with instances of beginner's luck.
3	3	"Buta-men, Kuru Kuru Bou Jelly, and..." Transliteration: "Buta-men to Kuru Kuru Bō Zerī to..." (Japanese: ブタメンとくるくるぼーゼリーと…)	Directed by : Satoshi Saga; Storyboarded by : Wakako Shigemoto	Yasuko Kamo	Masakazu Yamazaki & Kuniaki Masuda	January 21, 2016
3	3	"Bontan-ame, Seven Neon, and..." Transliteration: "Bontan-ame to Sebun Neon to..." (Japanese: ボンタンアメとセブンネオンと…)	Directed by : Satoshi Saga; Storyboarded by : Wakako Shigemoto	Yasuko Kamo	Masakazu Yamazaki & Kuniaki Masuda	January 21, 2016
Hotaru, along with Tō, arrive at the shop on a rather hot day and decide to boil water inside the shop in order to make butamen. While Hotaru insists that eating the snack in sweltering heat is the best way to enjoy it, Tō admits to Kokonotsu that he's only here to fantasize about Hotaru while she sensually eats the snack. Once the air conditioning breaks and Kokonotsu tells Hotaru that some dagashi might go bad due to the heat, the three decide to go to the pool while Tō contacts Saya about the meetup. Kokonotsu and Tō meet Yō (moonlighting as a lifeguard) and the girls at the pool; it is then revealed that Yō and Hotaru conspired the pool meeting in an effort to once again bring Kokonotsu closer to sweets. The plan backfires, however, when dagashi planted by the pair in the pool cannot be eaten because of a "No Food or Drink" sign they forgot to remove. The next day, Hotaru arrives at the shop to find Tō but no Kokonotsu, who is busy moving dagashi that might have gone bad from yesterday. Hotaru attempts to strike up a conversation with Tō about dagashi, but mistakes his aloofness towards the subject as a challenge. This culminates with Hotaru fast-balling candy into Tō's mouth as Kokonotsu stumbles upon the scene with no context and an air-conditioning repair crew. Kokonotsu makes Hotaru stay with Saya at the cafe shop and the two hit it off.
4	4	"Fugashi, Fugashi, and..." Transliteration: "Fugashi to Fugashi to..." (Japanese: ふがしとふがしと…)	Yoshihiro Hiramine	Tatsuhiko Urahata	Masakazu Yamazaki & Kuniaki Masuda	January 28, 2016
4	4	"Glico, Glico, and..." Transliteration: "Guriko to Guriko to..." (Japanese: グリコとグリコと…)	Yoshihiro Hiramine	Tatsuhiko Urahata	Masakazu Yamazaki & Kuniaki Masuda	January 28, 2016
Kokonotsu arrives at the shop to find Hotaru blindfolded. She challenges him to a blind taste test using various flavors of fugashi; she also includes the stipulation that the taster has to have their hands tied behind their back so as to not cheat by identifying the snack just based on texture. The two guess each flavor fed to them correctly, but Kokonotsu tries to trick Hotaru with a rare flavor of fugashi when the ones they were tasting run out. Much to his dismay, she still guesses it correctly. When it is Kokonotsu's turn, however, Hotaru complains of dry mouth and runs off to buy a drink, leaving him blindfolded and tied up. Yō, unluckily, returns to the shop before Hotaru and incorrectly infers the situation. Afterwards, Tō and Kokonotsu meet up at Cafe Endō. Tō notices Kokonotsu's doodles of the girls and literally draws attention to the difference in their breast size. Upon returning to the sweets shop, Kokonotsu bumps into Hotaru and realizes he left his notebook with the drawings at the shop. Hotaru, sensing Kokonotsu's predicament, tosses him a box of Glico caramel as the two use the kilocalories in the candy to race back to the cafe as fast as they can. Hotaru, however, runs out of candy and energy when the two are 300 meters away; Hotaru offers him her last piece as she collapses from exhaustion. As Kokonotsu makes it to the cafe, he unfortunately meets Saya already looking at the doodles.
5	5	"Bottle Ramune, Baby-Star Ramen, and..." Transliteration: "Bin Ramune to Bebī-Sutā Rāmen to..." (Japanese: ビンラムネとベビースターラーメンと…)	Directed by : Shuuji Miyazaki; Storyboarded by : Katsuyuki Kodera	Yasuko Kamo	Kanetoshi Kamimoto	February 4, 2016
5	5	"Yatta Men, Watch Out for the Sour Grape, and..." Transliteration: "Yattā Men to Suppai Budō ni Goyōjin! to..." (Japanese: ヤッターめんとすっぱいぶどうにご用心！と…)	Directed by : Shuuji Miyazaki; Storyboarded by : Katsuyuki Kodera	Yasuko Kamo	Kanetoshi Kamimoto	February 4, 2016
Kokonotsu interrupts his father and Hotaru enjoying binramune late at night. While Hotaru explains the oddities of the dagashi, Kokonotsu comments on the apparent addictiveness of the snack, especially after watching Yō greedily drink it despite the fact it is supposed to be for sale. The two decide to make themselves right while Kokonotsu goes back to bed. Sometime later (1:30 am), Kokonotsu is once again reawakened, this time by his father making food vlogs; Yō states that he's doing it to make money from YouTube's ad reveune, but also admits to only having 13 views in total among his videos. When Kokonotsu decides to watch his father record, he sees that he reads from a script and doesn't have much to say about Baby Star Ramen; he decides to help by naming facts about the dagashi's origins, mascots and naming convention without realizing that the webcam is still recording. This ends up netting the video over 100 views. Later, Hotaru drops by after hearing that Kokonotsu & Tō are broke. She introduces them to prizes located inside packages of yattamen, even though the prizes function more as coupons rather than yen and that Hotaru goes through several without winning anything. She confesses that she's actually never won a candy prize in her life, but nonetheless introduces the boys to the "Sour Grape challenge". This involves a three-pack of grape-flavored gum with one of them being extremely sour; the person who eats the sour one has to do something for the winners. Hotaru believes she has the boys beat due to the gum's packaging giving away which one is the sour one, but she realizes she purchased a pack with new packaging upon double-checking it. The three eat a piece and Hotaru loses. Kokonotsu tries to encourage a dejected Hotaru by saying that her rotten luck could be seen as a type of talent. Regardless, Hotaru runs off in frustration before Kokonotsu & Tō realize she never upheld her part of the deal.
6	6	"Super Himo Q, Ohajiki, and Sometimes Maken Gumi..."; Transliteration: "Chō Himo Q to Ohajiki to Tokidoki Maken Gumi..." (Japanese: 超ひもQとおはじきと ときどきまけんグミ…)	Directed by : Kosaya; Storyboarded by : Wakako Shigemoto	Michiko Yokote	Kanetoshi Kamimoto, Kuniaki Masuda & Masakazu Yamazaki	February 18, 2016
6	6	"Yoguret, Coconuts, and..." Transliteration: "Yōguretto to Kokonatsu to..." (Japanese: ヨーグレットとココナツと…)	Directed by : Kosaya; Storyboarded by : Wakako Shigemoto	Michiko Yokote	Kanetoshi Kamimoto, Kuniaki Masuda & Masakazu Yamazaki	February 18, 2016
Hotaru invites the three to a temple to try to discuss Super Himo Q, a dagashi resembling an elongated gummi worm. Tō interrupts her with a different dagashi, Maken gummies (a pun on jan-ken). He opens the package to find that he has the Paa (paper) version of the candy and then, noticing the similarities to the stretchy hand toy and with a confirming glare from Hotaru, decides to play a prank. He purposefully flips his sister's skirt up, angering Saya and causing her to punch him and send him several meters away. Hotaru tends gets back on the subject of Super Himo Q and demonstrates the different ways one can play with it. This leads to a modified game of tug of war between her and Kokonotsu in order to determine the succession of the shop. The game ends with a draw, so Hotaru moves on and tells Kokonotsu and Saya about the history of the dagashi's length while using it as nunchaku. The wild flinging causes a piece to snap off and fly into the air; Kokonotsu instinctively gives chase, grabs it with his mouth and lands on top of Tō. The four then decide to play Ohajiki in order to settle the succession matter. When Saya once again shows proficiency in a game she's never played, Hotaru brings the possibility of Saya working at the Shikada shop. She turns red at the thought as she stares at Kokonotsu. Later on, with Hotaru at last place, she pulls out a trump card, the forbidden ohajiki. It, unfortunately, slips from her hand and shatters once it hits the ground, leaving her in tears. The next day, Saya thinks about Hotaru's offer. She thinks back to a time when her and Kokonotsu were younger and played doctor with Yoguret, a nutritional dagashi that comes in a blister pack. Saya checked Kokonotsu's temperature with a hand on the forehead, but pushed him back when they made eye contact and insisted on him being doctor instead. Saya then tried to use the situation to get Kokonotsu to touch her body, but he obliviously prescribed "medicine" each time and sends her on her way. When they moved on to pretend surgery, Kokonotsu gave Saya the last piece of Yoguret as an anesthetic and sadly released he had no more left. When she tried to comfort him, they both fell over and locked hands. In the present day, Saya shakes off the embarrassing memory, comments that Kokonotsu's probably forgotten it by now and resumes her walk to the Shikada shop. Hotaru tends introduces today's dagashi, Yoguret; both Kokonotsu and Saya look away from each other in embarrassment and Saya darts off. She expresses some relief in the fact that Kokonotsu still remembers.
7	7	"Summer Festival, Hotaru, and..." Transliteration: "Natsu Matsuri to Hotaru to..." (Japanese: 夏祭りとほたると…)	Mitsuhiro Iwasaki	Yasuko Kamo	Kanetoshi Kamimoto & Masakazu Yamazaki	February 25, 2016
7	7	"Summer Festival, Saya, and..." Transliteration: "Natsu Matsuri to Saya to..." (Japanese: 夏祭りとサヤと…)	Mitsuhiro Iwasaki	Yasuko Kamo	Kanetoshi Kamimoto & Masakazu Yamazaki	February 25, 2016
Kokonotsu tags along with his father to set up their yearly monjayaki stand the day before the summer festival starts. The next day, he, Tō and Hotaru arrive at the festival. After announcing how much money they each have (¥2500, ¥3000 and ¥200, respectively), Hotaru informs the boys that she'll be able to earn more money by playing katanuki. After carefully cutting out a difficult tulip design and winning ¥5000, Tō decides to try his hand at the game and cuts out an umbrella design after several attempts. Unfortunately, he trips and breaks it on the way to redeem his prize. Later, Kokonotsu helps out Yō at the monjayaki stand. Saya shows up and Yō decides to let him Kokonotsu explore the festival with her while Tō takes over his friend's spot. After some games and food, Kokonotsu decide to try goldfish scooping. When he fails multiple times, Saya thinks back to a time when they were younger and Kokonotsu also failed repeatedly at the game. After using up all of his money to no success, the stand owner gave him a goldfish out of sympathy, which Kokonotsu decided to give to Saya. Coincidentally, the same thing ends up happening again; Saya accepts the goldfish with a blush and a thank you.
8	8	"Super Scary Story Gum, Typhoon, and..." Transliteration: "Chō Kowai Hanashi Gamu to Taifū to..." (Japanese: 超怖い話ガムと台風と…)	Directed by : Takafumi Fujii; Storyboarded by : Katsuyuki Kodera	Michiko Yokote	Kanetoshi Kamimoto & Masakazu Yamazaki	March 3, 2016
8	8	"Kendama, Popping Fortune-Telling Chocolate, and..." Transliteration: "Kendama to Puchipuchi Uranai Choko to..." (Japanese: けん玉とプチプチ占いチョコと…)	Directed by : Takafumi Fujii; Storyboarded by : Katsuyuki Kodera	Michiko Yokote	Kanetoshi Kamimoto & Masakazu Yamazaki	March 3, 2016
Kokonotsu, Tō, Hotaru and Saya sit out a typhoon in the powerless shop while Tō tells scary stories which frighten Saya but leaves Kokonotsu with questions about the inconsistencies in their plots. Hotaru offers an explanation; Tō is retelling stories from packages of Super Scary Story Gum that are entirely fictional. Regardless, they still frighten Saya. Later, after receiving inspiration from a YouTube video, Tō buys a pair of kendama for him and Kokonotsu to try to master. After failing repeatedly, Saya shows up and effortlessly juggles the ball while also revealing that Tō already had a few kendama back home, solidifying his ineptitude with the toy. After finding Tō near an embankment and a short discussion about popularity, he introduces Kokonotsu to Popping Fortune-Telling Chocolate. The dagashi manages to perfectly predict Tō's good health and the fact that neither of the boys have started their summer homework. After popping the "Wish" chocolate and wishing to see a panchira, Hotaru shows up looking for Kokonotsu. After agreeing to meet up at the shop later, Hotaru leaps off the ledge she was standing on, offering the boys an incidental glimpse. The three coincidences leave them astonished.
9	9	"Wata-pachi, Lucky Choco-droppings, and..." Transliteration: "Watapachi to Un Choko to..." (Japanese: わたパチとうんチョコと…)	Yoshihiro Hiramine	Tatsuhiko Urahata	Kanetoshi Kamimoto & Masakazu Yamazaki	March 10, 2016
9	9	"Sakura Daikon, Egg Ice Cream, and..." Transliteration: "Sakura Daikon to Tamago Aisu to..." (Japanese: さくら大根とたまごアイスと…)	Yoshihiro Hiramine	Tatsuhiko Urahata	Kanetoshi Kamimoto & Masakazu Yamazaki	March 10, 2016
Saya arrives at the shop to find that no one is there. Hotaru, however, arrives a bit later with a mouth ulcer, but continues to eat dagashi against Saya's advice. She continues to eat but the fizzy reaction of Watapachi ends up irritating her ulcer. Later, Saya notices a dagashi she's never seen before. Hotaru tells her about the Un-Choco, whose name and method of dispersal remind Saya of defecation. When Saya tries to hint at it, Hotaru misunderstands and assumes that Saya is insinuating that the dagashi's appeal is outside of their age bracket. After having a few of the grape and chocolate-flavored candies, Hotaru then wants to talk about the dagashi's innuendo, only to mistake it as eggs instead of feces. About two hours later, Kokonotsu arrives at the shop to find Hotaru eating rice and Saya having gone back home. Hotaru reveals that she is from Osaka and often represses her Kansai dialect. After a discussion about Sakura Daikon and the fact that some dagashi are region-specific, Hotaru leaves and reveals that she lied about her origins. She then returns to ask Kokonotsu if he likes boobs. He lies, believing that this is a trick questions, but changes his answer once Hotaru starts to walk out. Hotaru then introduces Egg Ice Cream, but she and Kokonotsu have a disagreement of whether to colloquially call it Boob Ice Cream or Bomb Ice Cream, respectively. She then decides to eat hers, causing the warm ice cream to explode all over her body. She remarks that she now understand why it could be referred to as a bomb, while Kokonotsu now understands why it could be referred to as a boob.
10	10	"That's Dagashi!"; Transliteration: "Dagashi Janē ka!" (Japanese: 駄菓子じゃねえか!)	Directed by : Shigehito Takayanagi; Storyboarded by : Kentarō Suzuki	Yasuko Kamo	Kanetoshi Kamimoto, Kuniaki Masuda & Masakazu Yamazaki	March 17, 2016
In the middle of the night, Tō is approached by Hotaru who asks for his help with something. Some days later, Kokonotsu realizes that Hotaru has not appeared at the shop at all recently and, after consulting with Saya, the two decide to pay a visit to the mansion where she is staying. Much to their surprise, they find a bedridden Hotaru who refuses to eat any kind of dagashi Kokonotsu brought with him as gifts for her and, after some inquiring, she reveals that her mouth ulcer had worsened. She wanted to get better in time to eat a new flavor of Baby Star Ramen that was about to be released. She also reveals that she decided to follow Tō's advice to stop eating dagashi at all to help her recuperation, but this triggers some withdrawal symptoms that lead her to attack Kokonotsu to claim the dagashi he brought. After calming her down, Kokonotsu and Saya discover that the "medicine" she was taking to treat her ulcer were bought at Kokonotsu's shop and were in fact, dagashi, thus not helping at all with her condition, much to their chagrin.
11	11	"Cola Gum, Yo and..." Transliteration: "Kōragamu to You to..." (Japanese: コーラガムとヨウと…)	Directed by : Tatsumi Fujii & Masatoyo Takada; Storyboarded by : Katsuyuki Kodera	Tatsuhiko Urahata & Yasuko Kamo	Kanetoshi Kamimoto & Masakazu Yamazaki	March 24, 2016
11	11	"Miyako Kombu, Ramune and..." Transliteration: "Miyako Konbu to Ramune to..." (Japanese: 都こんぶとラムネと…)	Directed by : Tatsumi Fujii & Masatoyo Takada; Storyboarded by : Katsuyuki Kodera	Tatsuhiko Urahata & Yasuko Kamo	Kanetoshi Kamimoto & Masakazu Yamazaki	March 24, 2016
After questioning Hotaru about why she thinks Yō is qualified to work for her father's company, Kokonotsu, Hotaru, and Saya spy on Yō from inside of a box while he works the shop. Although the endeavor initially seems useless, Yō ends up displaying his people skills when he covers for a boy buying Cola Gum for a girl he's trying to impress. This ends up giving Kokonotsu a slightly better impression of his father, until he almost starts to read through Kokonotsu's unfinished manga. Sometime later, Kokonotsu and Hotaru sit and wait for the next available train at a train station. To kill time, the two enjoy some Miyako Kombu and Ramune (the latter of which Kokonotsu inadvertently doesn't get to drink) that Hotaru brought while she tells the stories of both of their origins. The discussion then shifts towards the hopes and future plans for both of the characters; Hotaru then reveals, as she steps onto a train that just arrived, that she won't force him to succeed the shop, but she'll be available should he change his mind. The revelation causes Kokonotsu to miss the train.
12	12	"I'm Gonna Eat It-Hi, Poem of Cherries, and..." Transliteration: "Taberundesu Hi to Sakuranbo no Uta to…" (Japanese: 食べるんですHiとさくらんぼの詩と…)	Directed by : Mitsuhiro Iwasaki; Storyboarded by : Mitsuhiro Iwasaki & Shigehito Takayanagi	Tatsuhiko Urahata & Yasuko Kamo	Kanetoshi Kamimoto, Masakazu Yamazaki & Kuniaki Masuda	March 31, 2016
12	12	"Morinaga Milk Caramel, Sakuma Drops, and..." Transliteration: "Morinaga Miruku Kyarameru to Sakuma-shiki Doroppusu to…" (Japanese: 森永ミルクキャラメルとサクマ式ドロップスと…)	Directed by : Mitsuhiro Iwasaki; Storyboarded by : Mitsuhiro Iwasaki & Shigehito Takayanagi	Tatsuhiko Urahata & Yasuko Kamo	Kanetoshi Kamimoto, Masakazu Yamazaki & Kuniaki Masuda	March 31, 2016
A day after the previous episode, Hotaru and Saya discuss the flavor of love on a beach pier. Tō and Kokonotsu once again work on becoming popular through fortune-telling dagashi. When the two groups end up seeing each other from afar, Kokonotsu remembers his previous conversation with Hotaru at the train stop. He decides to give Hotaru an answer. Kokonotsu fears that his indecisiveness is tying Hotaru down to the town.

=== Season 2 (2018) ===
Note: All episodes from this season were storyboarded by Satoshi Kuwabara

No. overall	No. in season	Title	Directed by	Written by	Chief animation directed by	Original release date
13	1	"Big Katsu, Peperoncino, and..." Transliteration: "Biggu Kattsu to Peperonchīno to..." (Japanese: ビッグカツとペペロンチーノと…)	Fumihiro Yoshimura	Mayumi Morita	Akemi Kobayashi	January 12, 2018
Kokonotsu walks back home with Saya to find the Dagashi shop in a run-down state, and flashes back to about three months ago. Kokonotsu accidentally summons Hotaru after thinking out loud about Tonkatsu Ramen. Later, Saya tends to her family's cafe and voices her desire to eat real pasta, when Hotaru shows up with a Peperoncino dagashi.
14	2	"Baseball Board Game Gum, Pop Pop Boat, and..." Transliteration: "Yakyū-ban Gamu to Pon Pon Sen to..." (Japanese: 野球盤ガムとポンポン船と…)	Hiromichi Matano	Mayumi Morita	Akemi Kobayashi	January 19, 2018
As a typhoon approaches the area, Yo gets stuck outside while Saya, To, and Hotaru all get trapped at the Dagashi shop. As the girls take a bath, Hotaru brings out a Pop Pop Boat while To tries to peek in them.
15	3	"Beigoma, Reminiscence, and..." Transliteration: "Begoma to Tsuioku to..." (Japanese: ベーゴマと追憶と…)	Shigeru Chiba	Mayumi Morita	Akemi Kobayashi	January 26, 2018
Kokonotsu and To try to play with spinning top style toys called "beigoma," only to smash them into Kokonotsu's foot. Later, the two are joined by Hotaru, and then Saya, as they begin a battle royale with beigoma. Later, Hotaru reminisces about an old dagashi shop that she used to visit when she was a child.
16	4	"Homerun Bar, Fireworks Festival, and..." Transliteration: "Hōmuranbā to Hanabi Taikai to..." (Japanese: ホームランバーと花火大会と…)	Yasuo Iwamoto	Mayumi Morita	Akemi Kobayashi	February 2, 2018
The gang all decide to head to the local fireworks festival. Saya suggests to Kokonotsu that he should invite Hotaru, just as he finds Hotaru at the shop trying to pick a "Homerun Bar" ice cream with a winning stick. Kokonotsu asks Hotaru if she wants to go to the festival which leads her to wonder if it's just the two of them going. After missing the bus, Hotaru and Kokonotsu have a private conversation just as the fireworks begin. Hotaru gives Kokonotsu the winning stick, then leaves the town the next day. After Hotaru leaves town, Kokonotsu begins to miss her.
17	5	"Ambulance, Get a Move On, You Cod!, and..." Transliteration: "Kyūkyūsha to Taratara Shitenja ne Yo to…" (Japanese: 救急車とタラタラしてんじゃね〜よと…)	Yasuo Iwamoto	Michiko Yokote	Akemi Kobayashi	February 9, 2018
Between Yo's poor sales and Kokonotsu's depression, the dagashi shop has fallen into disrepair and is on the verge of closing. Still waiting for Hotaru's return, Kokonotsu convinces Yo to clean up the shop and keep it open, until Yo breaks his toe trying to run outside. Kokonotsu gets Saya and To to help him clean up the shop, introducing Saya to a dagashi with a title that sounds like an insult. Shortly after finishing their work, the gang notice that a convenience store has opened up across from them.
18	6	"Convenience Store, Job Magazine, and..." Transliteration: "Binikon to Kyūjin Jōhō-shi to..." (Japanese: ビニコンと求人情報誌と…)	Fumio Maeda	Michiko Yokote	Keita Saitō	February 16, 2018
A well-dressed man named Beni Yutaka welcomes Kokonotsu, Saya, and To to his new convenience store, which has everything from dirty magazines to small cakes. Kokonotsu replies that the cakes are too pricey for a convenience store in the area, and offers dagashi instead. Beni decides to see Kokonotsu as his rival. Later, Kokonotsu returns home to find Beni offering him a job with his store. First tempting him with a slightly higher than minimum wage, then with dirty magazines, then finally with an advertisement photo of his employees looking happy, except for one woman in the corner.
19	7	"Hajime Owari, Chocoball, and..." Transliteration: "Owari Hajime to Chokobōru to..." (Japanese: 尾張ハジメとチョコボールと…)	Fumio Maeda	Mayumi Morita	Akemi Kobayashi	February 23, 2018
An unkempt woman named Hajime Owari answers Kokonotsu's ad for part-time help minutes after he posts it outside the shop. Hajime has high qualifications but her personality quirks keep getting her fired from various jobs, including her last one at the convenience store across the street. When Kokonotsu lets slip that Yo is still in the hospital, Hajime offers to work just for room and board. The next morning, Kokonotsu finds Hajime sleeping on the floor, and begins to regret hiring her, until she talks about the Chocoball and the prizes within.
20	8	"Roll Candy, High Eight Chocolate, and..." Transliteration: "Rōren Kyandi to Haiei Chokoko to..." (Japanese: ロールキャンディとハイエイトチョコと…)	Yorifusa Yamaguchi	Mayumi Morita	Akemi Kobayashi	March 2, 2018
Saya is consumed by jealousy after seeing Hajime at the dagashi shop. She returns after school to confront her, only to find her sleeping on the job. Saya then decides to buy a Roll Candy, but neither woman knows quite how to eat it. Later, To stops by the shop while pretending to be a debt collector as a shared joke with Kokonotsu, only to find Hajime inside. He keeps up the act for her anyway, and she responds by pulling out "Chocolate Glasses," convincing To to buy several of them.
21	9	"Internets, Super Ball, and..." Transliteration: "Intānettsu to Sūpā Bōru to…" (Japanese: インターネッツとスーパーボールと…)	Shigeru Chiba	Michiko Yokote	Keita Saitō	March 9, 2018
After hearing Beni boast about selling cakes made-to-order through the internet, Kokonotsu decides to try making a website for his shop, and Hajime begins designing one. However, they spend too much time playing around with the concept page. Later, Hajime realizes she forgot to order Super Balls for the shop, so she makes multiple ones by hand instead.
22	10	"Monjiro Squid, Manga Manuscript, and..." Transliteration: "Monjirō Ika to Manga Genkō to…" (Japanese: 紋次郎いかと漫画原稿と…)	Yorifusa Yamaguchi	Michiko Yokote	Akemi Kobayashi	March 16, 2018
The shop receives an order for a small crate of Monjiro Squid online. Kokonotsu and Hajime head to a nearby hospital to deliver the squid only to find the recipient is Yo. He happily accepts the crate, but denies having placed the order. Yo then approves of Kokonotsu taking over the shop, reminding him that he hasn't been working on his manga at all. Kokonotsu finds an ad for a manga contest due in two days and tries to make a manga chapter from scratch, but realizes he can't finish it in time on his own. Hajime walks in and offers to help him finish his manuscript, along with Saya and To providing moral support.
23	11	"Homerun Bar Winning Stick, Snow, and..." Transliteration: "Hōmuranbā no Atari Bō to Yuki to..." (Japanese: ホームランバーの当たり棒と雪と…)	Fumio Maeda	Mayumi Morita	Akemi Kobayashi & Nana Miura	March 23, 2018
Kokonotsu, Hajime, and Saya manage to finish the manga in time for the contest. Kokonotsu arrives at the manga review on time, only to be rejected by the editor for turning in a rushed product. Kokonotsu begins doubting himself while his train home is delayed indefinitely by snow, when Hotaru appears before him at the same station.
24	12	"I'm Back, Welcome Back, and..." Transliteration: "Tadaima to Okaeri to…" (Japanese: ただいまとおかえりと…)	Fumio Maeda	Mayumi Morita	Akemi Kobayashi	March 30, 2018
Hotaru reveals she left to help her family's company and is heading elsewhere on the same train as Kokonotsu. Though Kokonotsu is still stuck in self-pity, Hotaru cheers him up. As the trains are officially cancelled, Hotaru reveals she brought a suitcase full of "Buta-men" ramen dagashi, and the two spend the night together. The next day, Kokonotsu awakens alone in a room and wonders if the encounter was a dream, only to find Hotaru standing outside, and revealing that she plans to return with him to Shikada Dagashi. The two then take the next train home to find Hajime, Saya, and To welcoming them back, even though Kokonotsu didn't win. After Hajime reveals that she works at the shop, a series of arguments follows: Hotaru gains trust in Kokonotsu's business skills and begs him to work for her instead of Yo, just as Yo returns from the hospital and begs Kokonotsu to keep running his shop, then Beni appears to offer Kokonotsu work for his store after Hotaru calls him out as her older brother, Beniyutaka Shidare, while Saya yells that Kokonotsu wants to focus on his manga. Kokonotsu runs away from the store while the group argues over his fate.
