= Field dressing =

Field dressing can refer to:

- Field dressing (bandage), also known as a battle dressing
- Field dressing (hunting)
