= Water balloon =

Latex rubber balloon filled with water

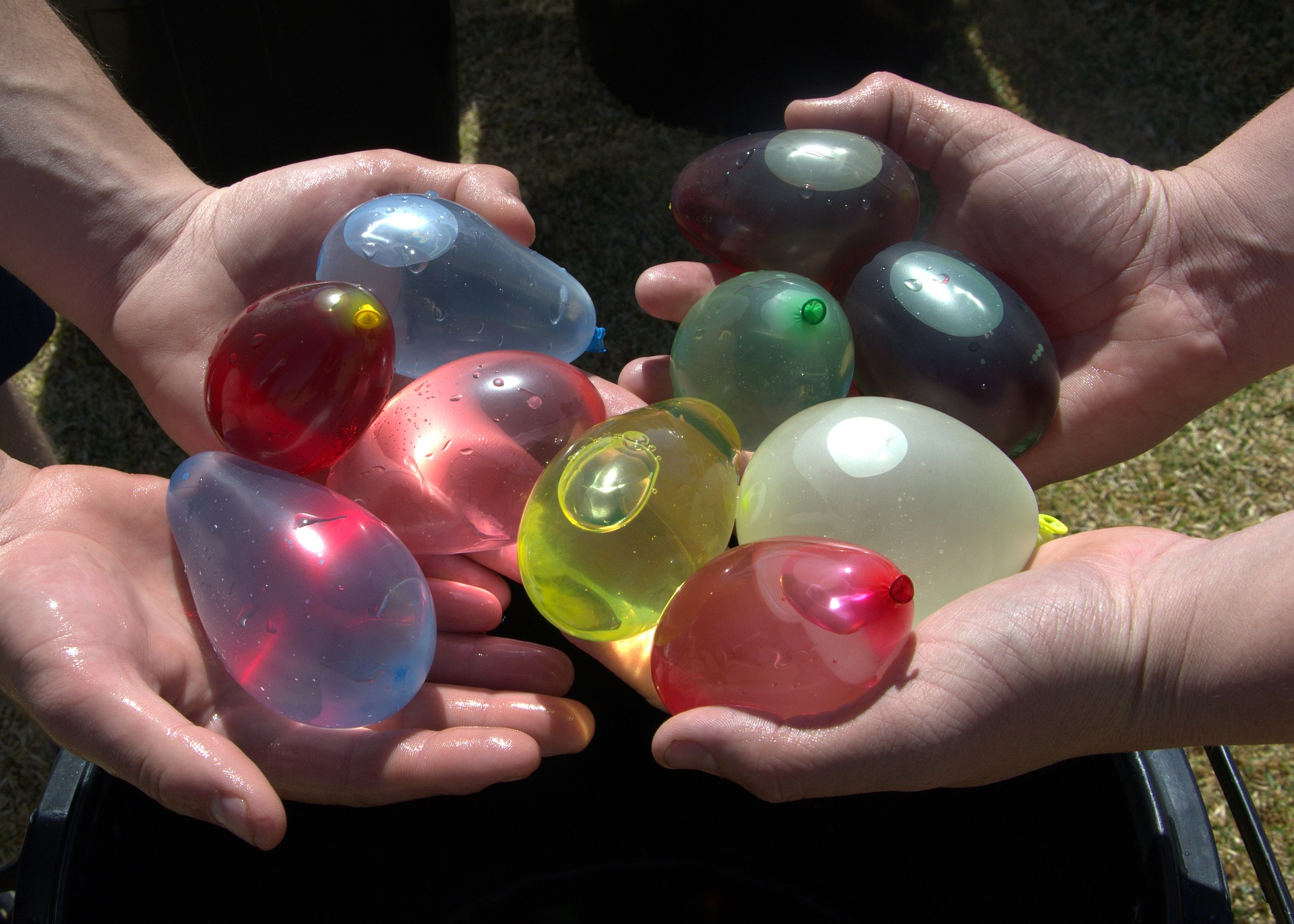
A selection of filled water balloons

A water balloon or water bomb is a balloon, often made of latex rubber, filled with water. Water balloons are used in a summer pastime of cooling off through water balloon fights. Water balloons are also popular for celebrations, including celebrating Holi and Carnival in India, Nepal, and several other countries.

== Types ==
Water balloons are common in sizes from 40 and 100 mm or 1 1/2 and 4 in though larger sizes are available. Typically water balloons are sold in quantity and often include a filling nozzle in the packaging. Many of the low cost brands use small water balloons and generic nozzles which both tend to be difficult to use.

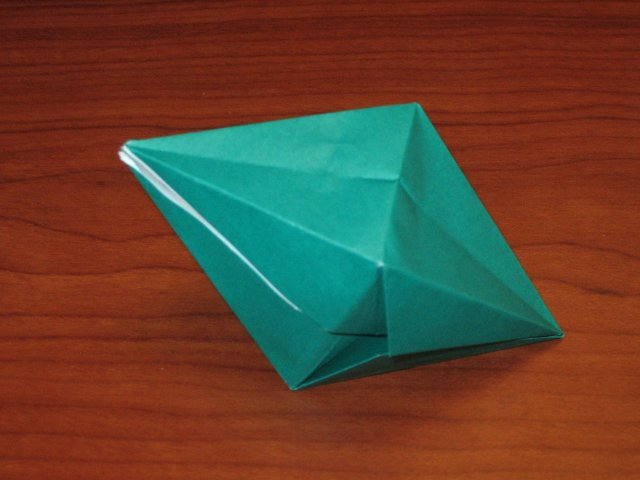
An octahedral paper water bomb

Another form of water bomb is a sheet of paper folded to form a container capable of holding water. These are then filled and used in a similar way to latex versions.

Gas balloons (air or helium types) may be used as water balloons, but are not typically preferred because the balloon wall thickness is different. A water balloon is designed to be filled up to the approximate size of a baseball in a pear shape (so as to be thrown more easily), whereas some gas balloons, when filled with water, may reach the size of a basketball; this is disadvantageous because those balloons are harder to handle, usually requiring two hands. Mainly for safety reasons, water balloon walls are designed to be thick enough to be held without bursting yet thin enough to burst upon impact.

In a similar process to gas balloons, water balloons may be molded into various shapes at manufacturing. One process involves a patented mandrel for making elastomeric articles.

Reusable water balloons are an alternative to the traditional single use balloons. These minimize environmental impact and clean up and tend to be easier and more efficient to fill. However, they are typically more expensive than rubber balloons. There are a multitude of types, including magnetically locking spheres and absorbent fabric balls.

== Risks ==
Water balloons thrown by hand in person-to-person fights pose little risk of injury. There are, however, multiple accounts of injury to the eyes from water balloons launched by slingshot, which can increase the impact energy into the same range as a rifle bullet. Injuries and property damage have also been reported when a balloon is thrown from or at a moving vehicle.

== Filling and tying devices ==
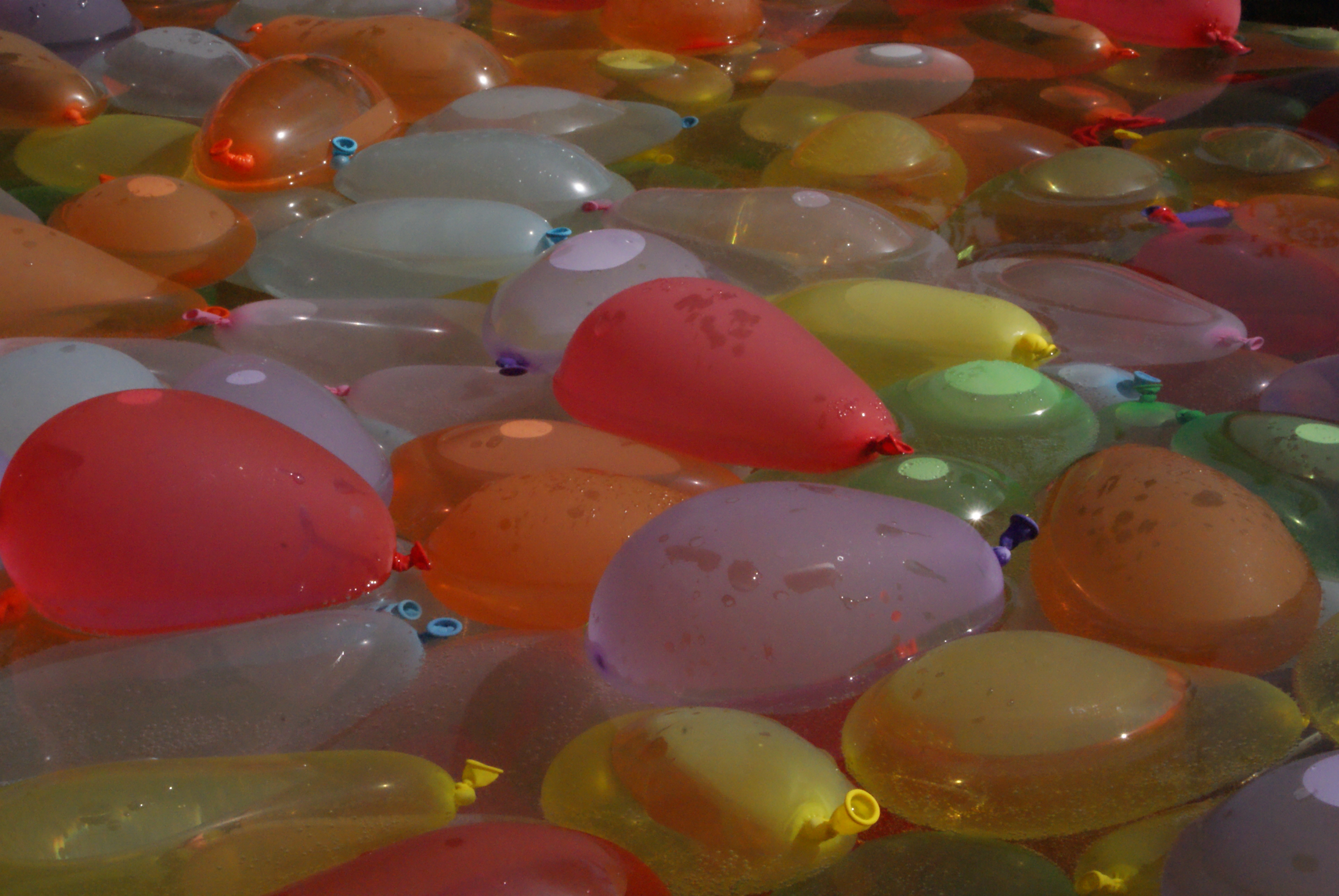
A variety of water balloons placed in water to prevent popping

Water balloons are typically filled at an indoor faucet, an outside tap, or at the end of a garden hose. Multiple types of filling nozzles are available on the consumer market and come in threaded (3/4 in [1.9 cm] standard in the U.S.) and non-threaded types. Non-threaded nozzles are called filling funnels and may be difficult to use. Some brands of nozzles are called loader instead of nozzle, but no differentiation exists between other types of nozzles. Nozzles may include a valve feature for turning the water source on or off as needed.

Homemade water balloon filling stations may incorporate water balloon nozzles or valves that are on the market or use common plumbing fixtures. These stations may have one or more nozzles or valves. Portable and fixed station designs each have distinct pros and cons depending on the location of use, number of system users, and the quantity of filled water balloons needed. Multi-nozzle stations not only enable more water balloons to be filled for adults planning upcoming youth events or for preventing boredom in children upset with how challenging it may be to fill a balloon at a hose spigot, but greatly enhance group social interactions which is very important in toys for children and adult volunteers that work with children.

Multiple toy companies have created balloon tying and filling devices, enabling the user to easily fill and tie water balloons.

== Launching devices ==
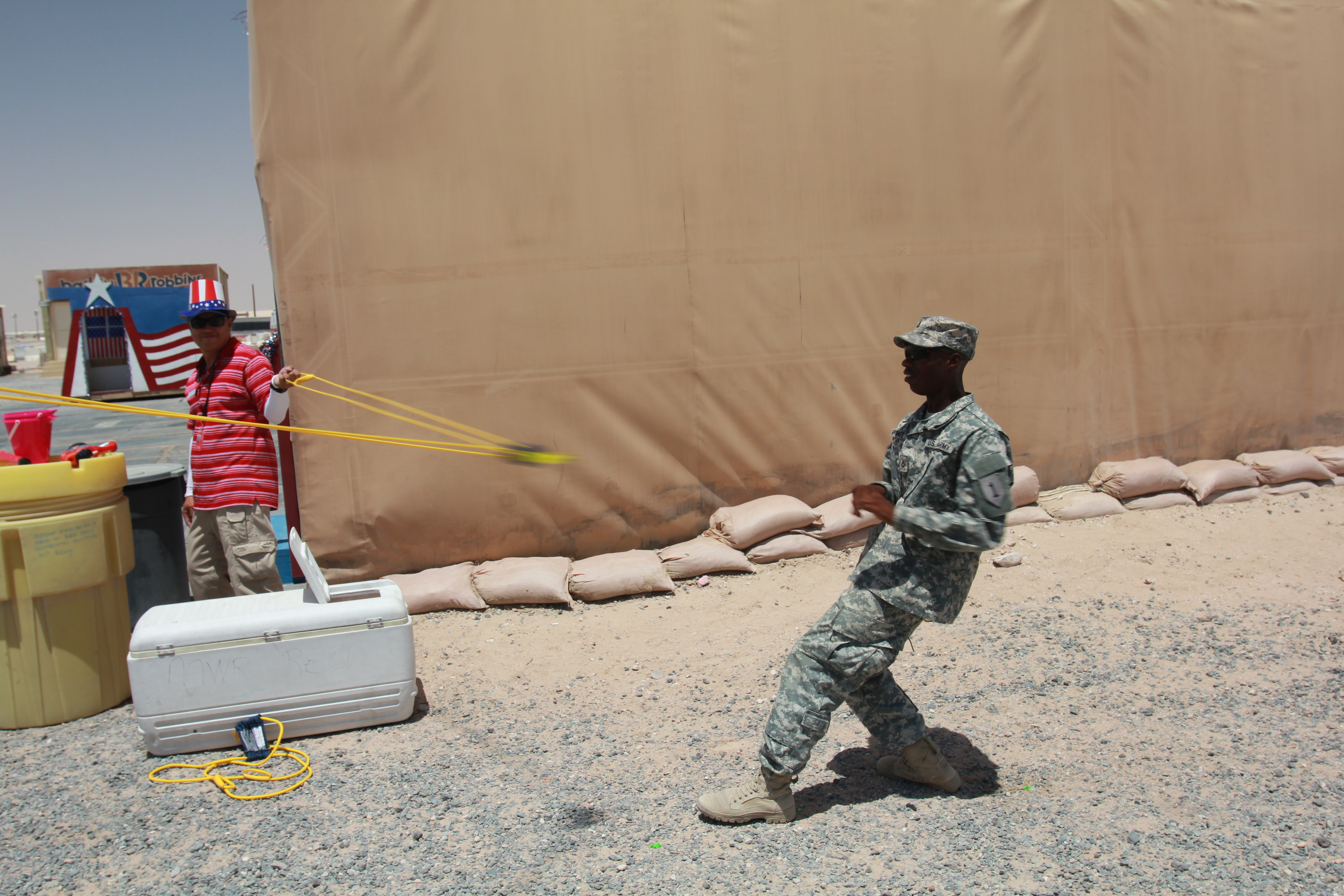
A soldier stretches a giant slingshot with a water balloon in it.

A water balloon launcher or water balloon slingshot is a catapult toy that shoots water balloons significantly further than hand-throwing and is used in some water balloon fights. Both home-made and commercially sold models exist, with stationary, mobile, and multi-person-operated types available. Even though water balloon launchers are mainly marketed towards children, adults also engage in water balloon activities. Some water balloon launchers are capable of launching water balloons further than 300 yards (274 metres).

It is unsafe to misuse a water balloon launcher by loading it with snowballs. Water balloon launchers pose a risk of eye injuries, such as when a young man suffered orbital blowout fracture resulting from the misuse of a water balloon launcher, and became legally blind from his left eye. In another case, a 31-year-old female suffered from traumatic retinal dialysis in her right eye, resulting in permanent loss of vision.

== Environmental impact ==
Water balloons, like air balloons, are generally made from latex, which naturally decomposes. While there still could be some environmental impact if burst water balloons are left behind in the wild where animals might ingest them, that impact would be low. However, some air balloons are made from mylar, which does not decompose (or only extremely slowly). If mylar balloons are used as water bombs, then littering or leaving behind mylar balloons will have a much bigger environmental impact.

== Yo-yo balloon ==
Yo-yo balloons, also known as Water yo-yos, are a common type of water balloon found at matsuri festivals in Japan. Typically small, round, and colourful, the balloons are filled to a diameter of about 75 mm (3 in) with air and roughly 45 mL (1.6 imp fl oz; 1.5 US fl oz) of water. The balloon is clipped or tied closed and hung from an elastic string with a finger loop tied at the end. This gives them enough weight and bounce to function as a yo-yo, earning them their name. The balloons are often won in a game (Yo-yo Tsuri or just yo-yo) where they are set floating in a tub of water. Players "fish" for the balloons with a hook at the end of a twisted paper string. As the wet paper line breaks easily, the game is often likened to goldfish scooping in terms of difficulty.

The Wii video game Ennichi no Tatsujin includes a virtual Yo-yo Tsuri game.

== World record ==
Guinness World Records maintains a record category for largest water balloon fight. The current holder is the University of Kentucky Christian Student Fellowship, a campus ministry of the Christian churches and churches of Christ.

Location	Date	Number of participants	Number of balloons	Reports
Coogee, New South Wales, Australia	April, 2006	3,000	55,000	Video of fight
University of Kentucky Christian Student Fellowship	August, 2008	2,744	58,000	Video of fight
Brigham Young University	July, 2010	3,927	120,000	Video of fight
University of Kentucky Christian Student Fellowship	August, 2011	8,957	175,141	Video of fight
University of Kentucky Christian Student Fellowship	August, 2012	11,622	236,484	Video of fight

== Gallery ==
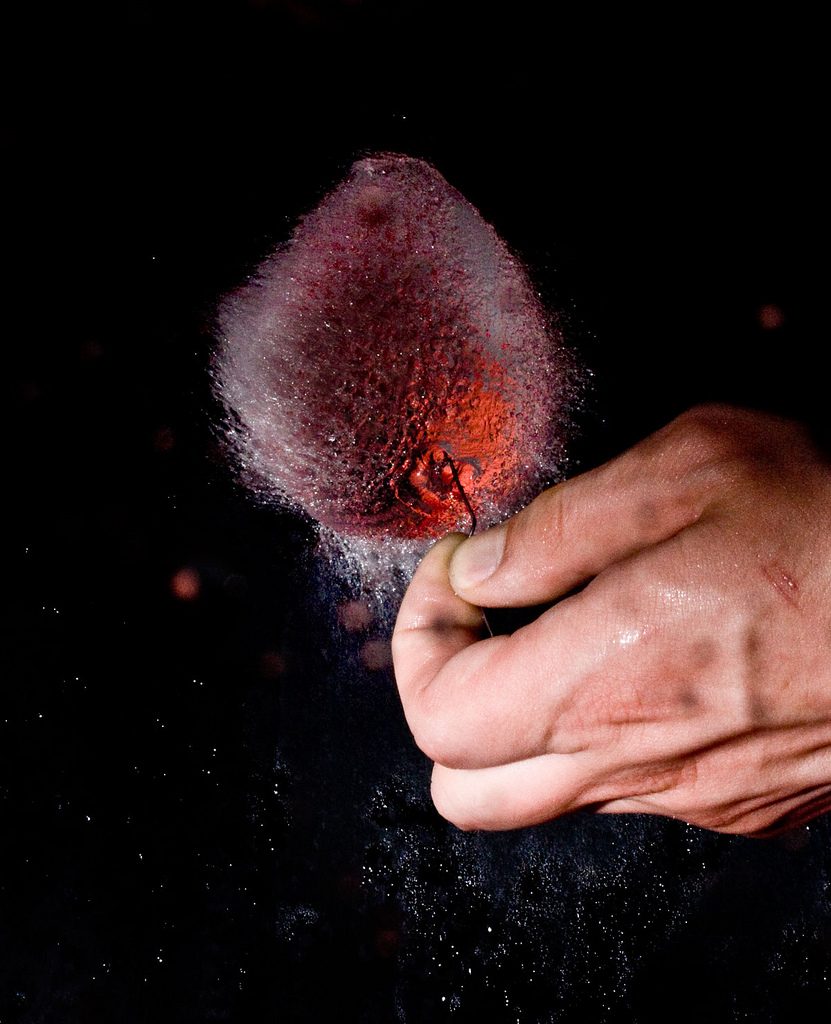
Pricking a filled water balloon

High-speed capture of a water balloon popping

== See also ==
- List of inflatable manufactured goods
- Water balloon launcher
