= Ennichi no Tatsujin =

2006 video game

- Official box art
- Developer(s): Namco Bandai Games
- Publisher(s): Namco Bandai Games
- Series: Taiko no Tatsujin
- Platform(s): Wii
- Release: JP: December 2, 2006
- Genre(s): Mini-games
- Mode(s): Single Player, Multiplayer

Ennichi no Tatsujin (縁日の達人, lit. "Festival Master") is a video game for Nintendo's Wii console. It was a launch title in Japan. The game is composed of several minigames, all of which revolve around Japanese festivals. This is Namco Bandai Games' first Wii game.

== Modes ==
The game consists of nine mini-games within a single unified experience. The Wii Remote is the primary controller used for the majority of these games. The specific games are listed below.

- Kingyo Sukui: A game which uses virtual net to grab goldfish from a tank.
- Shateki: a game to fire as much possible bottles with a gun.
- Takoyaki: a game to flip as much possible Takoyaki balls over.
- Darts: Throw darts, striking targets in the specified order.
- Balloon Art: Use the Wii Remote and Nunchuk to twist a balloon into shapes. Movements must be timed to coincide with the background music.
- Yo-yo Tsuri: The Wii Remote is used to aim a paper string and hook onto balls in a bucket of water. The trick is to keep the string from tearing apart.
- Wanage: A game of ring toss to grab prizes.
- Uranai no Yakata: This is a fortune tellers house. The Wii Remote and Nunchuk are used to make a pair of virtual hands grasp a crystal fortune ball and hear a fortune for the day.
- Crepe: A game where players are required to meet a target number of crêpes, using the exact toppings only requested by the customers.

== Reception ==
On release week, Famitsu gave the game a 27 out of 40 (7/7/6/7).
