= Ericson Yachts =

Ericson Yachts, Inc. was a pioneering builder of fiberglass yachts. Ericson is now out of business, but its designs have been reproduced periodically by other manufacturers.

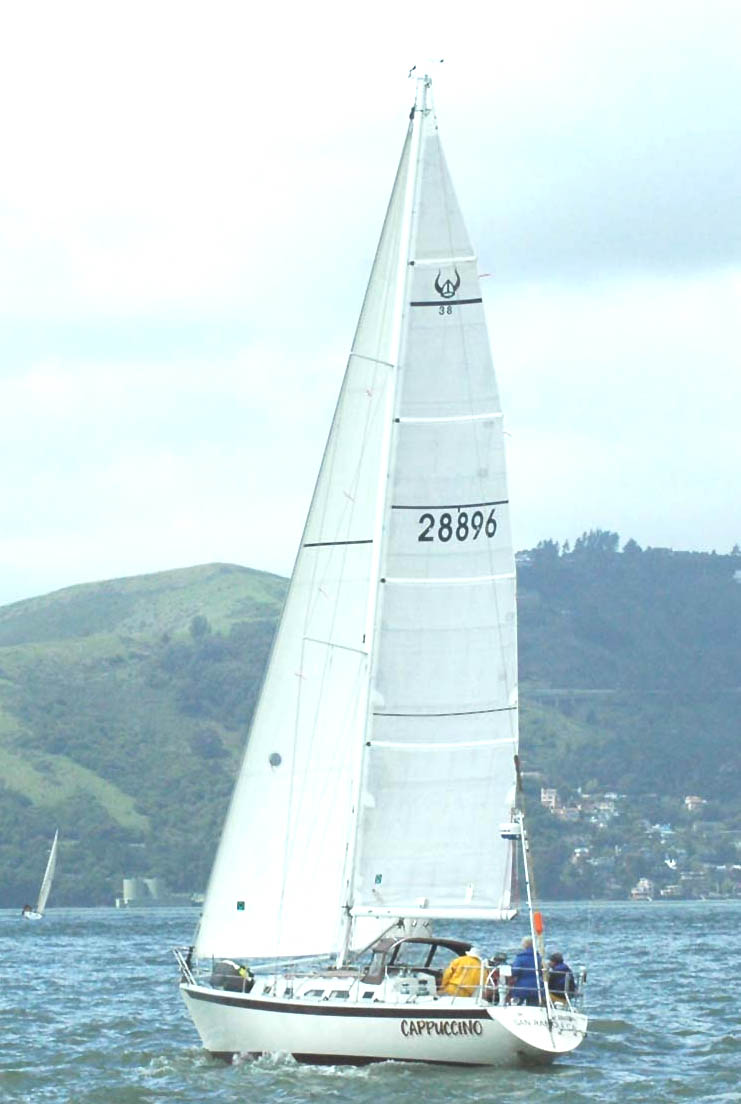
Ericson 38 Cappuccino from Berkeley Yacht Club, racing on San Francisco Bay

== History ==
Ericson Yachts was founded by Handy and Jenkins in about 1963. They began with molds bought from a defunct builder as well as from an enterprising dump operator. After a year or two of operation, they filed for chapter 11 bankruptcy and were subsequently purchased by Mark Pitman and Del Walton in 1965. During this period yacht designer Bruce King's first production designs were built. They were the E-30, E-32 Scorpion, E-41, E-35-2, and the E-23. In 1968 Ericson was sold to Pacific American Industries, Roland Mayotte Chairman. Mark Pitman stayed on as president, and Del Walton stayed on as VP of sales. The new facility on Deere Ave in Irvine was built by PAI. During this period the E-32-2, E-29, E-39, E-27, and E-46 were built. 1.64 In 1971 Ericson was sold to CML, Charles Leighton Chairman. Mark Pitman left, and Del Walton became president. During this period the E-25, E-37, E-23-2, E-36C, Madcap (custom 40) (Ericson 41 1967-1971 1-50 Hauls 41'Ocean Racer) E-31C/Independence 31, E-34-R/E-34-T, E-30-2/30+ were produced. In 1978 Red Cavaney replaced Del Walton as president. The E-25+/26, E-38/E-381/E-38-200 were produced. In 1981 Eugene Kohlmann replaced Red Caveney as president. The E-35-3/E-34, E-32-3, and the E-28 were produced. In 1985 Ericson was sold by CML to Acquico, Eugene Kohlmann president. In 1990 Ericson ceased operations and liquidated assets. Some of the molds the E-26, E-28, E-32, E-34, E-38, and E-43 (never built) were bought by Pacific Seacraft, a subsidiary of Singmarine Corp.

Pacific Seacraft itself was purchased by Southern Californian businessman Jeffrey Emery in September 1998.

Hull #1, E-32 Scorpion resides in Oregon, built in 1965, and is possibly the first production Ericson.

== Models ==
Model	Years Built	Number Built	LOA	LWL	Beam	Displacement	IOR	PHRF	CSF
Ericson 23-1	1968-1971		23'	19' 6"	7' 6"	2,700 lbs.		264	2.15
Ericson 23-2	1974-1979		22' 11"	19' 6"	7' 11"	3,100 lbs.		222	
Ericson 25	1972-1978		24' 8"	20' 10"	8' 0"	5,400 lbs.	18.0		1.82
Ericson 25+	1979-1984		25' 5"	21' 10"	9' 3"	5,000 lbs.		204	2.16
Ericson 26	1966-1969		25' 10"	21' 11"	9' 2"	5,250 lbs.		234	2.12
Ericson 26 II	1967-1968		25' 10"	21' 11"	9' 2"	5,250 lbs.		234	2.12
Ericson 26 III	1984-?								
Ericson 26 IV (300s)	1987-?								
Ericson 27	1971-1979		26' 9"	20' 6"	9' 0"	6,600 lbs.		225	1.88
Ericson 28+	1980-1984						186		
Ericson 28	1985-1990		28' 6"	24' 2"	10' 6"	7,500 lbs.		186	2.06
Ericson 29	1970-1979		28' 7"	22' 0"	9' 3"	8,500 lbs.		198	
Ericson 30	1966-1970		30' 3"	23' 4"	9' 6"	7,800 lbs.	26.5	192	
Ericson 30 II	1977-1979		29' 11"	25' 4"	10' 5"	8,990 lbs.		162	
Ericson 30+	1979-?		29' 11"	25' 4"	10' 6"	9,000 lbs.		162	
Ericson 31C	1976-1978		30' 11"	23' 11"	10' 5"	11,400 lbs.			1.85
Ericson 31 (Independence 31)	1978-1981		30' 11"	23' 11"	10' 5"	11,500 lbs.			1.85
Ericson 32 "Scorpion"	1967-1967		32' 3"		6' 3"			198	
Ericson 32 II	1969-1978		32'5"	25'8"	9' 8"	8,806 lbs.		180	
Ericson 32 III	1985-							156	
Ericson 32 200	1988-?		32' 5"	25' 9"	10' 9"	9,700 lbs.			2.02
Ericson 33	1981-1984		33' 0"	26' 10"	11' 2"	9,500 lbs.	25.2		
Ericson 333									
Ericson 34-T	1978								
Ericson 34	1987-1996		34' 10"					123	
Ericson 35	1967-1968		34' 9"						
Ericson 35 II	1969-1981		34' 8"	27' 10"	10' 0"	11,600 lbs.			1.77
Ericson 35 III	1982-1990	284	35' 6"	28' 10.5"	11' 4"	13,000 lbs.		123	1.93
Ericson 36C	1975-1977		36' 0"	30' 0"	12' 0"	16,000 lbs.			
Ericson 36	1980-1984		35' 7"	29' 0"	11' 10"	11,600 lbs.		108	
Ericson 37	1973-1975		37' 5"	28' 6"	11' 4"	16,000 lbs.		120	
Ericson 38	1979-1987		37' 8"	30' 6"	12' 0"	14,900 lbs.			
Ericson 380 (Pacific Seacraft)	1993-?		37' 10"	30' 6"	12' 0"	15,500 lbs.		114	
Ericson 381	1982-1986							117	
Ericson 382	1985-1986								
Ericson 38 III	1987-?								
Ericson 39	1970-1979		39' 0"	30' 0"	11' 4"	19,000 lbs.		108	1.69
Ericson 39B	1974-1978		39' 0"	30' 0"	11' 4"	22,000 lbs.		108	
Ericson 39 SM	1971-????		39' 0"	30' 0"	11' 4"	19,000 lbs.			
Ericson 41	1967-1971		41' 4"	29' 2"	10' 8"	17,800 lbs.		150	1.64
Ericson 46	1971-1974		45' 10"	35' 0"	13' 3"	31,500 lbs.		72	

== Sources ==
- Hornor, Jack. "Ericson 38 - 2nd Time Around," Boat/US Magazine, May, 2002.
- "New Boat Review," Practical Sailor, 24(2), January 15, 1998.
- Southern California PHRF (Rating Board)
- Ericson Owner's History Webpage
- Ericson Discovers The Keys to Success
- Kretcschmer, John, Used Boat Notebook, Sheridan House, 2002 pages 101 -105
- Spurr, Daniel, Heart of Glass, McGraw Hill, 2000 pages 144, 239 - 240, 292 & 352.
- Jones, Gregory, The American Sailboat, MBI Publishing Co., 2002, ISBN 0-7603-1002-5 pgs 168 - 169
- Editors of Practical Sailor, Practical Boat Buying, Belvoir Books, 2003 ISBN 978-1-879620-72-8 pg 191
