= Die cutting =

Die cutting may refer to:

- Die (manufacturing)
- Die cutting (shearing), the general process of shearing using dies
- Die cutting (web), the cutting of shapes out of webs
- Die preparation of semiconductor chips
- Another name for die making
- Katanuki (Japanese, lit. Die Cutting), a game where one cuts a shape out of a sheet of candy
