= Field dressing (bandage) =

Kind of bandage carried mainly by soldiers

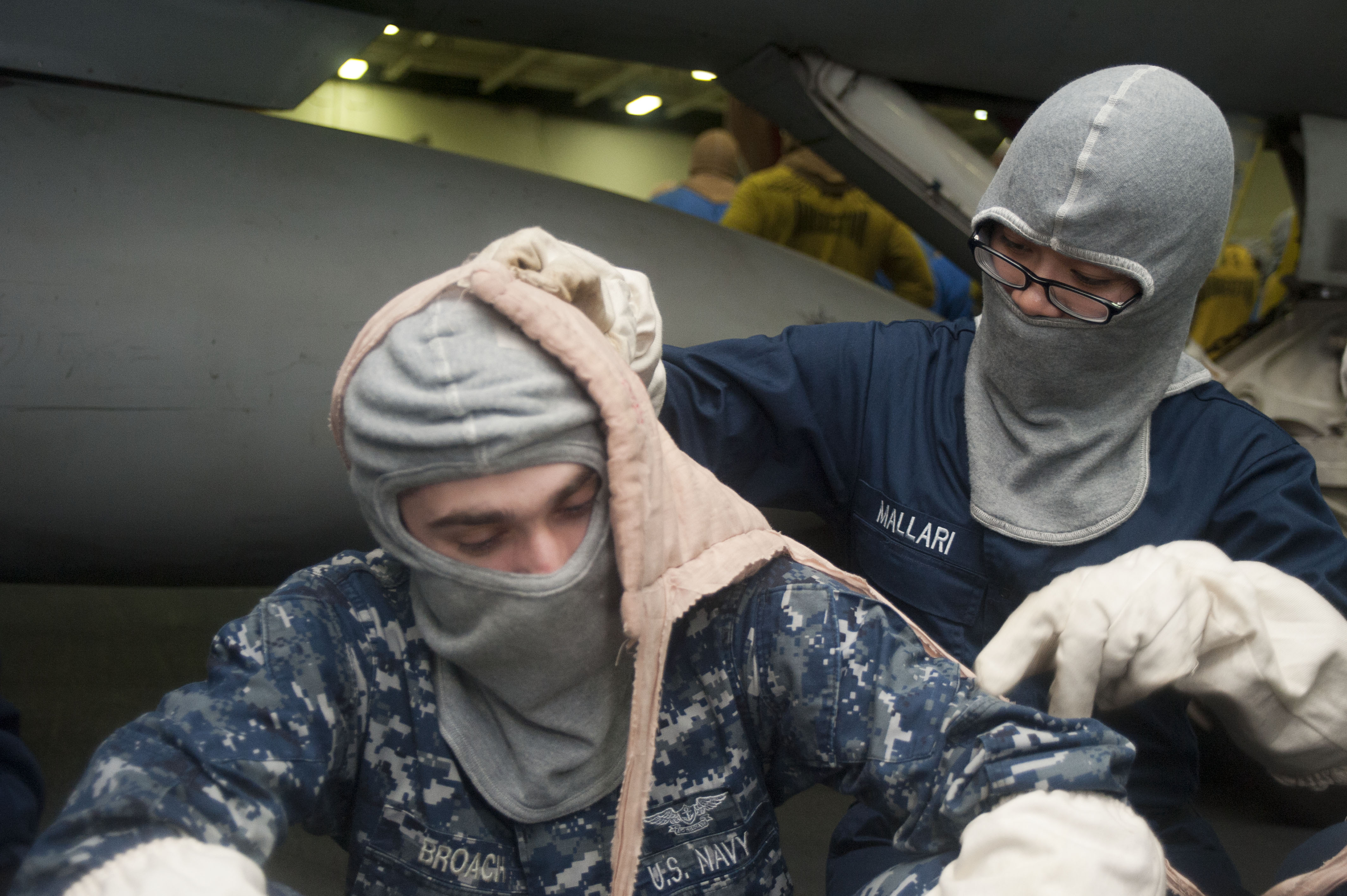
A sailor wraps a field dressing around a casualty's head.

A field dressing or battle dressing is a kind of bandage intended to be carried by soldiers for immediate use in case of (typically gunshot) wounds. It consists of a large pad of absorbent cloth, attached to the middle of a strip of thin fabric used to bind the pad in place. Field dressings are issued in sealed waterproof pouches to keep them clean and dry; the pouch can be torn open when required.

In combat, each soldier carries one field dressing ready for immediate use. Standard doctrine is that a casualty's dressing should be used rather than the rescuer's – the rescuer may need to help another casualty, or be helped himself, whereas the original casualty is not going to make any other use of his own dressing. Because of this, it is important that soldiers know where to find their comrades' field dressings, and infantry units typically have their own SOP stating where they should be carried. British Army uniforms issued in the past included dedicated field dressing pockets. During the Great War, this pocket was in the front left skirt of the tunic, with the introduction of Battledress (1937), it was moved to the trousers, but the current clothing does not. Instead, a common location for field dressings is the left shoulder-strap of the webbing, either held in place with gaffer tape or contained in a small pouch that is not issued but can be purchased from several civilian suppliers.

Some combat medical technicians make use of field dressing wrappers in the management of "sucking" chest wounds. In such wounds, the working of the chest sucks air through the wound into the space around the lung, rather than sucking air down the throat and into the lung. The hole must be sealed to enable the casualty to breathe properly. As a battlefield interim measure, the waterproof wrapper of a field dressing can be placed over the hole, with the clean inside against the wound, and taped in place. Tape is applied to the sides and top of the wrapper, leaving the bottom edge free. The wrapper then acts as a simple flapper valve, preventing air being sucked in but allowing any that has already entered to be forced out as the casualty exhales.

== US Army first-aid packet, Carlisle dressing ==
US Army first-aid packet, Carlisle dressing AKA "First-aid Packet, U.S. Government Carlisle Model" was originally designed at, and took its name from the Carlisle Barracks Military Reservation, Pennsylvania, in the early 1920s, where the "Medical Department Equipment Laboratory" was first established. First Aid Packets had been in use with the US Military since before World War I in the form of the FIRST AID PACKET – U.S. ARMY. Every soldier carried one in a web pouch on his equipment belt. It was one of the most common items of military use and supply. The dressing carried inside the pouch was intended as an immediate compress to stop bleeding from a wide variety of wounds and establish a sterile covering. It consisted of a white linen gauze pad with long gauze tails so it could be tied around an arm or even the chest.

=== Development ===
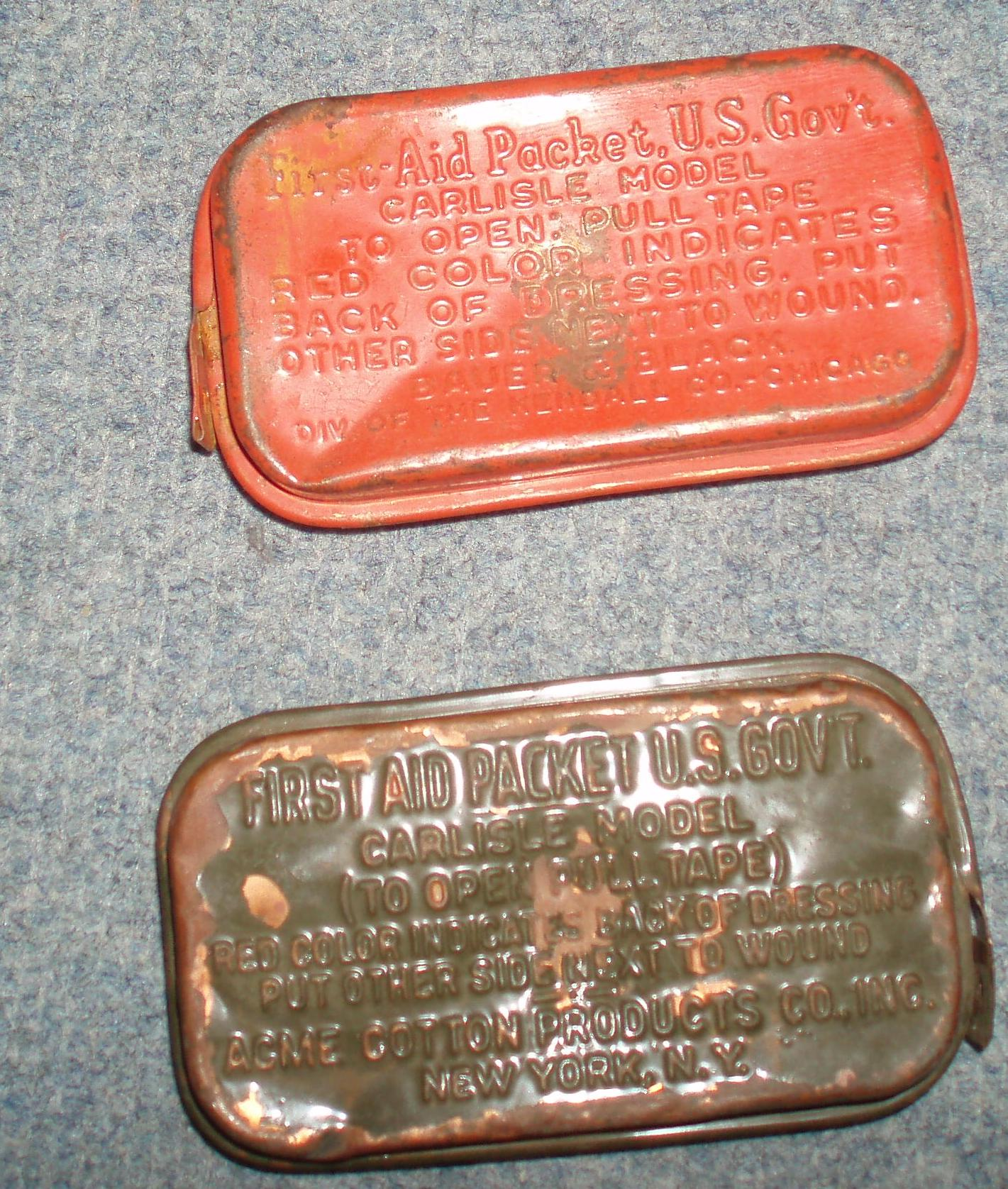
US-military first aid packet in sheet-metal packet, era of 2nd World War.

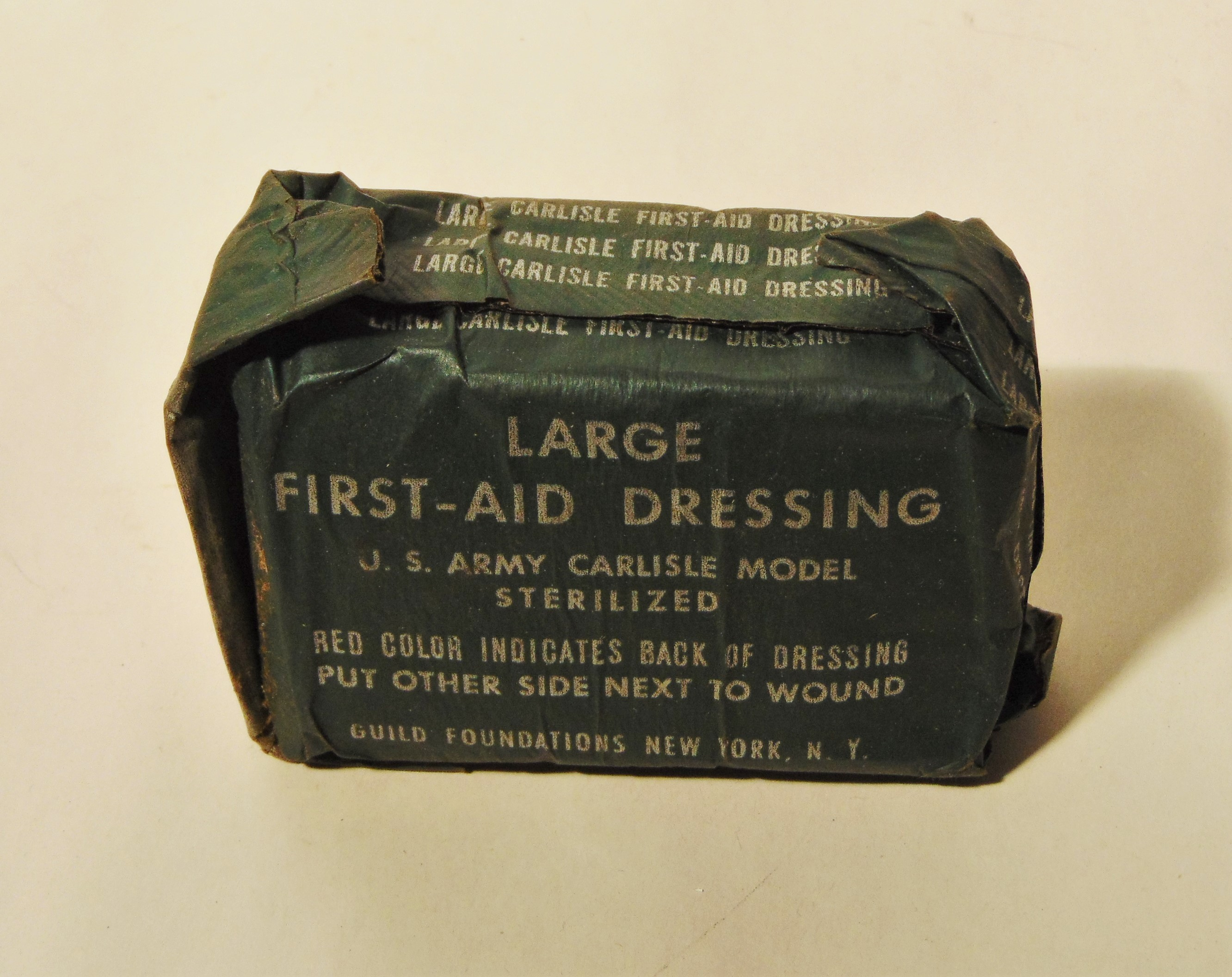
Large first-aid dressing, U.S. Army Carlisle model sterilized, packed in dark green packaging, rectangular model, New York.

This dressing, already developed in 1904, and subsequently introduced in 1906, was supplied to the troops in a sealed brass casing, to protect the bandage inside against gas attacks, and to also ensure that it remained sterile. An improved version was introduced in 1940, designated First-Aid Packet, U.S. Government – Carlisle Model to tackle the problem of front line wounds and casualties. The Carlisle Bandage underwent a number of changes in its development during WW2. In summer of 1940, U.S. Army, Carlisle Model Small First-Aid Dressing made its appearance. It was contained in a waxed rectangular tuck-end carton, printed with the required markings. Considerable difficulty was encountered in the procurement of the first aid packet. During the Army expansion of 1940, approximately eight million were required for initial stock of equipment In the middle of 1941, the Medical Department decided to amend their specifications, and placed purchase orders for containers made out of tin (instead of brass). The new version was introduced by fall of 1941, together with the very first Sulfanilamide Shaker Envelopes. During the early part of 1943, a plastic container (called Tenite) was developed and put into production, but under field conditions the package warped and broke open. In the course of 1943 the items were wrapped in laminated paper, reinforced with aluminum or lead foil, and covered internally with either pliofilm, cellophane, or polyvinyl butyral and placed inside an appropriate waxed cardboard shell. The small Carlisle model first aid dressing measured approximately 10 x 5 x 2.5 cm (4 x 2 x 1 inches). When opened, its 1 cm-thick (1/2 inch) pad measured 18x10 cm (7x4 inches) and had two long gauze tietapes. The Large Carlisle model first aid dressing was a square approximately 30 cm (11 3/4 inches) wide. Brief instructions were stenciled on the bandage in red ink. Most packaging included the word "Sterile" and the directions "Red color indicates back of dressing – put other side next to wound." If a dressing was "camouflaged" it was olive drab in color. Detailed explanations and photos concerning the application of dressing to wound were included in a printed manuals for US soldiers.
