= Ericson 25+ =

Sailboat class

Development
- Designer: Bruce King
- Location: United States
- Year: 1978
- No. built: 660
- Builder: Ericson Yachts
- Role: Cruiser

Boat
- Displacement: 5,000 lb (2,268 kg)
- Draft: 4.92 ft (1.50 m)

Hull
- Type: monohull
- Construction: fiberglass
- LOA: 25.42 ft (7.75 m)
- LWL: 21.83 ft (6.65 m)
- Beam: 9.25 ft (2.82 m)
- Engine: inboard diesel engine/outboard motor

Hull appendages
- Keel: fin keel
- Ballast: 2,000 lb (907 kg)
- Rudder: internally-mounted spade-type rudder

Rig
- Rig type: Bermuda rig
- I foretriangle height: 30.50 ft (9.30 m)
- J foretriangle base: 10.50 ft (3.20 m)
- P mainsail luff: 31.50 ft (9.60 m)
- E mainsail foot: 10.50 ft (3.20 m)

Sails
- Sailplan: fractional rigged sloop
- Mainsail area: 165.38 sq ft (15.364 m^{2})
- Jib/genoa area: 160.13 sq ft (14.877 m^{2})
- Total sail area: 325.50 sq ft (30.240 m^{2})

Racing
- PHRF: 213

The Ericson 25+, also called the Ericson 25 Mark II, is an American trailerable sailboat that was designed by Bruce King as a cruiser and first built in 1978.

The boat replaced the Ericson 25, often referred to as the Ericson 25 Mark I, in the company product line.

== Production ==
The design was built by Ericson Yachts in the United States, with 660 boats produced between 1978 and 1984, but it is now out of production.

== Design ==
The Ericson 25+ is a recreational keelboat, built predominantly of fiberglass, with wood trim. The hull is solid hand-laid fiberglass, while the deck, cockpit and coach house are balsa-cored fiberglass. It has a fractional sloop rig with a deck-stepped mast. The hull has a raked stem, a nearly plumb transom, an internally mounted spade-type rudder controlled by a tiller and a fixed fin keel or optional shoal draft keel. It displaces 5,000 lb (2,268 kg) and carries 2,000 lb (907 kg) of lead ballast.

The boat has a draft of 4.92 ft (1.50 m) with the standard keel and 3.92 ft (1.19 m) with the optional shoal draft keel.

The boat is fitted with a diesel engine of 7.5 hp (6 kW), an OMC 15 hp (11 kW) saildrive or a small outboard motor for docking and maneuvering. The fuel tank holds 20 U.S. gallons (76 L; 17 imp gal) and the fresh water tank has a capacity of 20 U.S. gallons (76 L; 17 imp gal).

The design has sleeping accommodation for five people, with a double "V"-berth in the bow cabin, two straight settee quarter berths in the main cabin and an aft quarter berth on the starboard side. The galley is located on the port side at the companionway ladder. The galley is L-shaped and is equipped with a stove, 5 cu ft (140 L) icebox and a double sink. The enclosed head is located just aft of the bow cabin on the starboard side. Cabin headroom is 73 in (190 cm).

The design has a PHRF racing average handicap of 213 and a hull speed of 6.3 kn (11.7 km/h).

== Operational history ==
In a 2000 review for Practical Sailor, Darrell Nicholson wrote, "despite the chubbiness of the 25+, owners report that she is a fast boat under sail. There are a number of features that contribute to this speed, She has minimum wetted surface, despite a displacement that is average for her overall length, though fairly light for a waterline length of almost 22' ... Without a doubt, the interior of the Ericson 25+ is a real accomplishment, It is well finished, generally well designed, and remarkably roomy for a boat of this overall length. There is some miniaturization of components, such as the galley sink, head sink, and hanging locker. Nonetheless, she’s a big little boat, and would be truly comfortable for extended coastal cruising for a couple. That is something that can rarely be said for a 25' boat."

In a 2010 review Steve Henkel wrote, "besides changing from a centerboarder to a fin keeler, the Mk II or 25+ version of the Ericson 25 adds a little length and beam, plus five feet of mast height and 23 percent of sail area to the Mk I ... At the same time, displacement is reduced by 400 pounds and ballast is reduced by 500 pounds. No wonder that average PHRF on the Mk II is reduced from 234 on the Mk I to a mere 213. The layout below on the Mk II is roughly the same as on the Mk I, except a starboard-side quarterberth has been added and the galley components have been shifted around a bit ... Best features: Fit and finish are good, as on the Mk I. With her wide beam, tall cabin, and relatively long waterline, the Mk II wins the elbow room prize ... Worst features: As with the Ericson Mk I, we found no significant negative features."

== See also ==
- List of sailing boat types
