= Ericson 25 =

Sailboat class

Development
- Designer: Bruce King
- Location: United States
- Year: 1973
- Builder: Ericson Yachts
- Role: Cruiser

Boat
- Displacement: 5,100 lb (2,313 kg)
- Draft: 3.80 ft (1.16 m)

Hull
- Type: monohull
- Construction: fiberglass
- LOA: 24.67 ft (7.52 m)
- LWL: 20.83 ft (6.35 m)
- Beam: 8.00 ft (2.44 m)
- Engine: inboard motor/outboard motor

Hull appendages
- Keel: fin keel
- Ballast: 2,500 lb (1,134 kg)
- Rudder: transom-mounted rudder

Rig
- Rig type: Bermuda rig
- I foretriangle height: 30.50 ft (9.30 m)
- J foretriangle base: 10.50 ft (3.20 m)
- P mainsail luff: 25.00 ft (7.62 m)
- E mainsail foot: 8.42 ft (2.57 m)

Sails
- Sailplan: masthead sloop
- Mainsail area: 105.25 sq ft (9.778 m^{2})
- Jib/genoa area: 160.13 sq ft (14.877 m^{2})
- Total sail area: 265.38 sq ft (24.655 m^{2})

Racing
- PHRF: 234

The Ericson 25, also called the Ericson 25 Mark I is an American trailerable sailboat that was designed by Bruce King as a cruiser and first built in 1973.

The design was replaced in the company product line in 1978 by the Ericson 25+, also called the Ericson 25 Mark II.

== Production ==
The design was built by Ericson Yachts in the United States, from 1973 until 1978, but it is now out of production.

== Design ==
The Ericson 25 is a recreational keelboat, built predominantly of fiberglass, with wood trim. It has a masthead sloop rig, a raked stem, an angled transom, a transom-hung rudder controlled by a tiller and a fixed fin keel or an optional keel and centerboard combination.

A tall rig was also available, with a mast about 2.5 ft (0.76 m) taller, intended for areas with lighter winds.

The boat is normally fitted with a small inboard engine or a 6 to 10 hp (4 to 7 kW) outboard motor for docking and maneuvering. The fuel tank holds 9 U.S. gallons (34 L; 7.5 imp gal).

The design has sleeping accommodation for four people, with a double "V"-berth in the bow cabin and two straight settee quarter berths in the main cabin, around a drop-leaf table. The galley is located on both sides of the companionway ladder. The galley is equipped with a two-burner stove, an icebox and a sink. The head is located just aft of the bow cabin on the starboard side. Cabin headroom is 66 in (170 cm) and the fresh water tank has a capacity of 9 U.S. gallons (34 L; 7.5 imp gal). There is an anchor locker in the bow.

For downwind sailing the design may be equipped with a spinnaker.

The design has a PHRF racing average handicap of 234 and a hull speed of 6.1 kn (11.3 km/h).

== Variants ==
Ericson 25 fin keel
This model displaces 5,100 lb (2,313 kg) and carries 2,500 lb (1,134 kg) of lead ballast. The boat has a draft of 3.80 ft (1.16 m) with the standard keel.
Ericson 25 keel and centerboard
This model displaces 5,400 lb (2,449 kg) and carries 2,500 lb (1,134 kg) of ballast. The boat has a draft of 5.0 ft (1.5 m) with the centerboard down and 2.0 ft (0.61 m) with it retracted.

== Operational history ==
In a 2010 review Steve Henkel wrote, "when she came out in 1972, this vessel was seen as remarkably roomy for a 25-footer, as indeed she was ... The Ericson 25 Mk I ... is well-finished and nicely laid out for comfortable alongshore cruising, She is also designed to race, with testing done in the Davidson Laboratory at Stevens Institute and a hull rated as a quarter-tonner. Best features: She cleverly combines a high aspect ratio centerboard with a trunk almost totally beneath the cabin sole, eliminating the nuisance of a protruding trunk splitting the cabin in two. Her sales brochure touts her easy trailerability, and shows a photo of the boat on a four-wheel trailer, her 7,700 pounds of load towed by a Cadillac sedan—something that today no ordinary car, including a Cadillac, could come close to doing. Worst features: We could not come up with any significant negative features."

== See also ==
- List of sailing boat types
