= Pliofilm =

Brand of plastic wrap

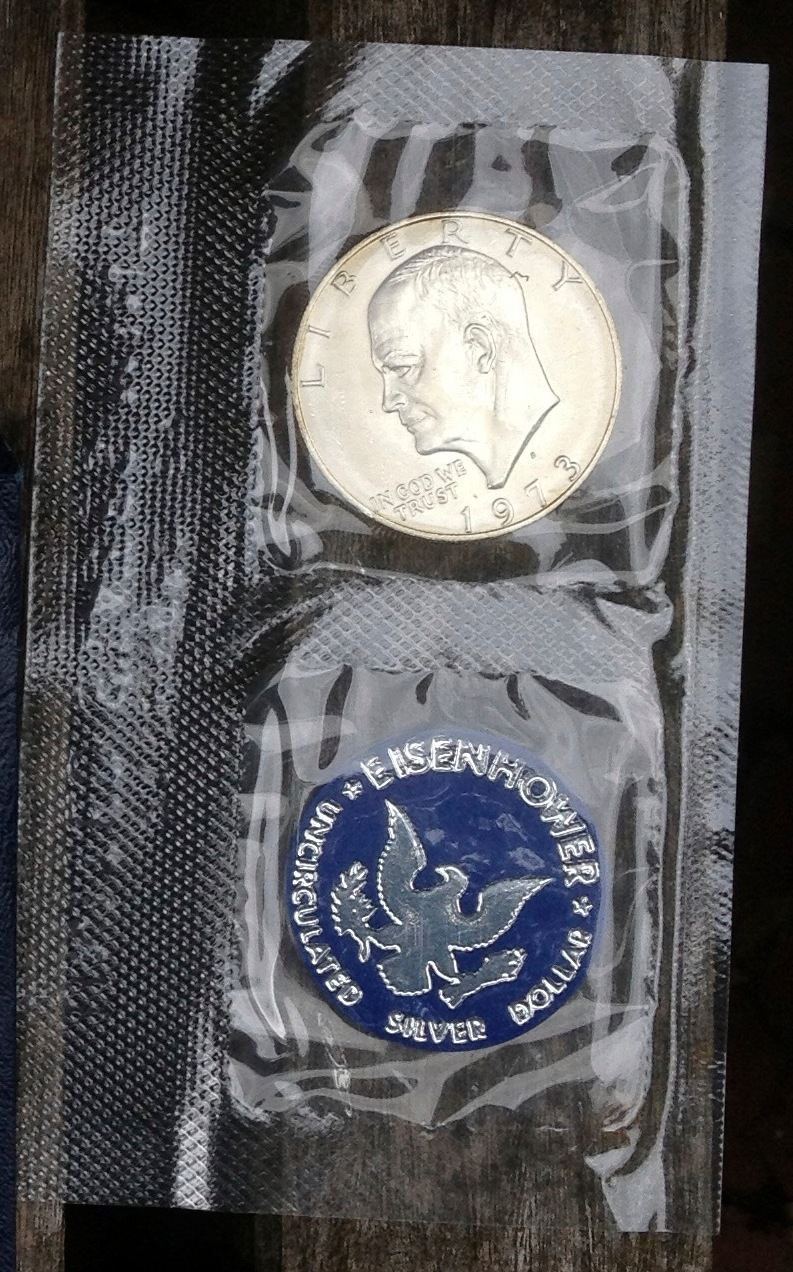
A 1973 Eisenhower dollar and printed token enclosed in Pliofilm

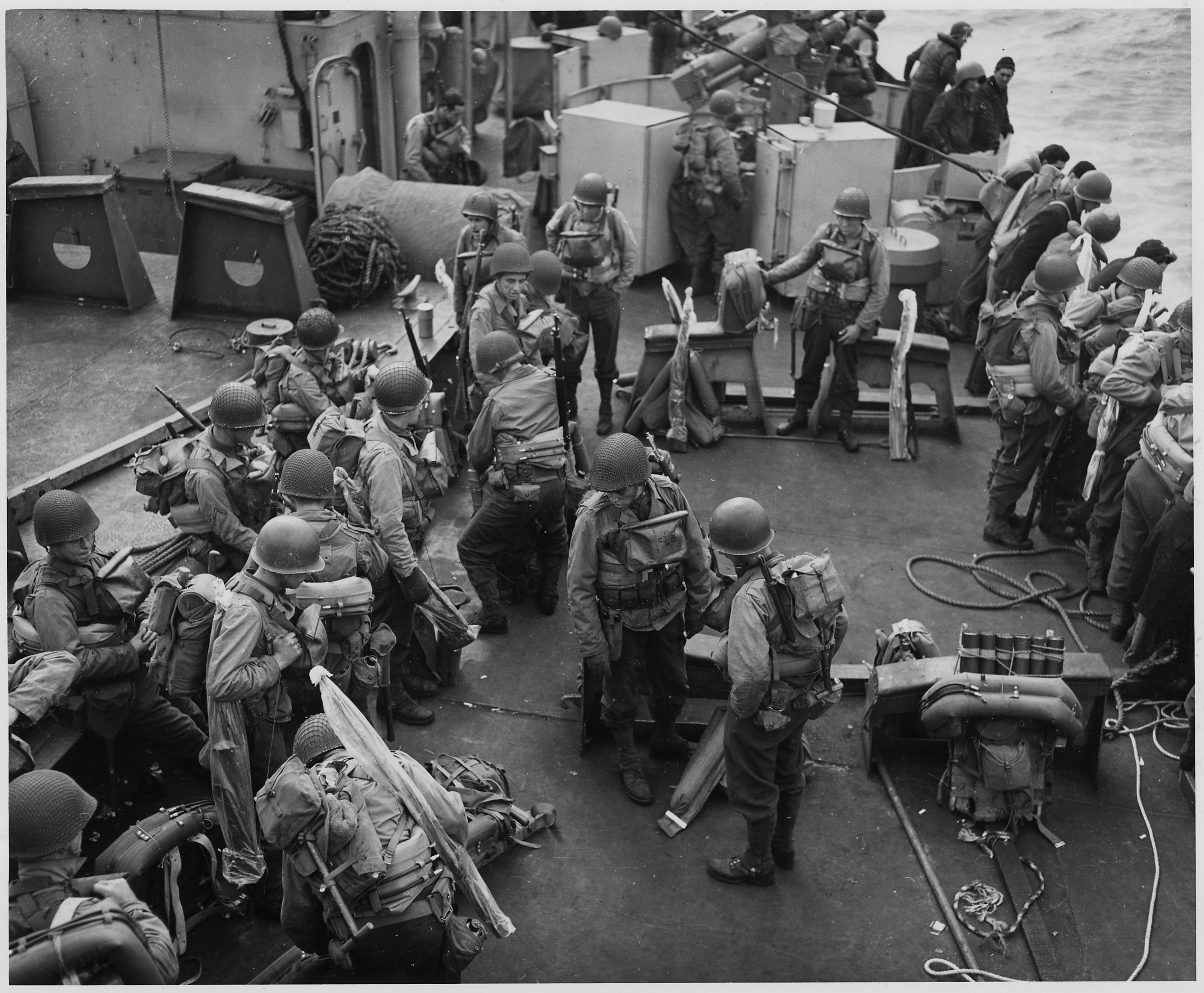
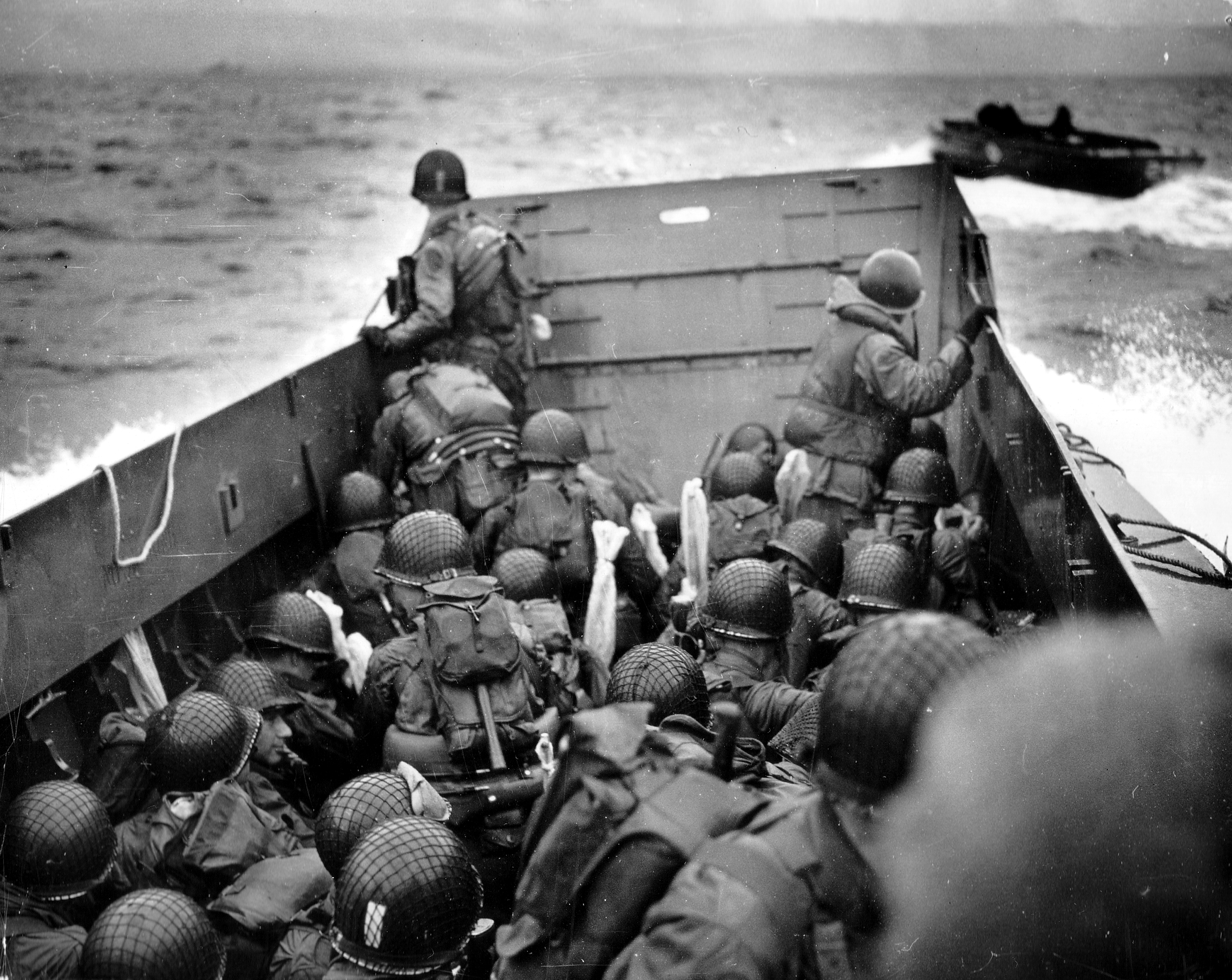
American troops at sea during the Normandy landings, Pliofilm covers can be seen on many of their firearms.

Pliofilm was a plastic wrap made by the Goodyear Tire and Rubber Company at plants in the US state of Ohio. Invented in the early 1930s, it was made by dissolving rubber in a benzene solvent and treating it with gaseous hydrochloric acid. Pliofilm was more stable in a range of humidities than earlier cellulose-based wraps and became popular as a food wrap. Its manufacture exposed workers to carcinogenic benzene and, when an additive was used to improve durability, caused dermatitis.

Production of Pliofilm was hampered during World War II because the Japanese occupation of much of Southeast Asia cut off much of the rubber supply. During the war years production was given over entirely to military purposes, with Pliofilm being used to wrap machinery and to waterproof firearms. After the war a plant was opened in Wolverhampton, England, and commercial production continued until the late 1980s.

== Manufacture ==
Pliofilm is a transparent film made of rubber hydrochloride. It is impermeable to water and water vapour and non-flammable.

Pliofilm was manufactured by dissolving natural rubber in the solvent benzene. The solution was kept in a tank at around 10 °C (50 °F) and treated with gaseous hydrochloric acid. The material was then neutralised with an alkali. The product was cast as a sheet on an endless belt which passed through a dryer that drove off the solvent. The finished product was around 30% chlorine. It could be made thinner by stretching whilst being heated and thicknesses of 0.00075–0.025 inches (0.019–0.635 mm) were sold. Thicker sheets could be produced by laminating the product, combining several sheets with the use of rubber cement.

== History and uses ==
Pliofilm was invented by Harold J. Osterhof at the Goodyear Tire and Rubber Company in the early 1930s and first marketed in 1934. The product found early use as a food wrap, its very low oxygen permeability helping to keep foods fresh. Its clinginess and better stability at a range of humidities was an advantage over the cellulose wrapping films used previously; Pliofilm became about as popular as Cellophane by 1937 and had supplanted cellulose films by 1942. Pliofilm could also function as a shrink wrap and was marketed as a means to reseal bottles (it was advised to place the Pliofilm over an embroidery hoop and to heat it while twisting the bottle).

The material was also used to manufacture aprons and protective sleeves to protect factory workers from hazardous substances. Pliofilm saw widespread use during World War II as a means of protecting tools and engines during shipping. For aviation parts a modified product was produced; a chemical known as RMF was added in quantities of 1–5% to make the product less susceptible to deterioration by ultra-violet light. RMF led to dermatitis in workers who had contact with it. The United States Public Health Service investigated the factories involved and recommended that workers wear protective sleeves made from ordinary Pliofilm. The manufacturing process also caused workers to become exposed to benzene. A study of Pliofilm workers at Goodyear's Akron and St. Marys, Ohio, plants between 1936 and 1976 was used as the basis for determining the cancer slope factor and occupational exposure standards for benzene.

The United States Armed Forces used Pliofilm to waterproof firearms during World War II amphibious landings. Sleeves were produced in three sizes to suit pistols, rifles, and sub-machine guns and were sealed by tying a knot in the sleeve or with an elastic band. It was intended that soldiers would tear off the sleeve after landing, though some troops kept them on inland due to fields having been flooded by the Germans as a defensive measure. The Pliofilm usually trapped enough air to keep the firearm buoyant if dropped in water. Because the sleeve prevented use of the weapon's regular sling some troops fashioned ad-hoc slings from rope that could be used over the Pliofilm. The Houston Chronicle series "D-Day In Color" noted that Pliofilm wrapped around weaponry is evident in an image of United States Army infantry at the Normandy landings.

Pliofilm manufacture was hindered by the Japanese occupation of rubber-producing countries in Southeast Asia. Commercial outputs were stopped and the entire production given over to military uses, leading to a large commercial demand and a backlog of orders after the war's end. In the post-war years Pliofilm saw use as a food wrap, to package drugs and textiles, and as a means of laminating paper. It was also marketed as Vitafilm. Production was extended abroad to the Goodyear factory in Wolverhampton, England, in the late 1940s. The United States Mint switched its packaging for mint set coins from Cellophane to Pliofilm in 1955. The American Chemical Society awarded Harold J. Osterhof the 1971 Charles Goodyear Medal for inventing Pliofilm. It remained commercially available until at least 1987.
