= Ericson 29 =

Sailboat class

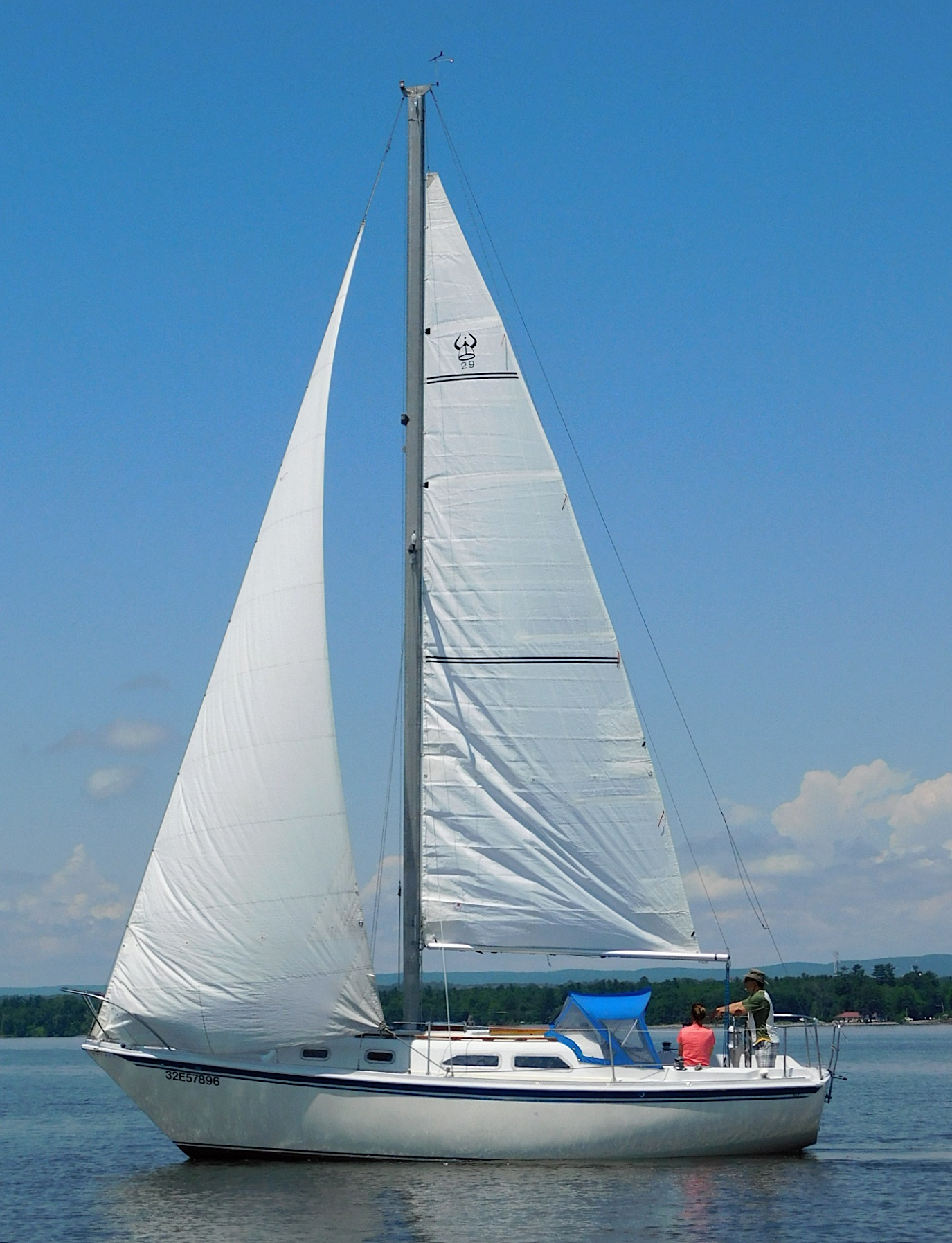

Development
- Location: United States
- Year: 1970
- Builder: Ericson Yachts
- Role: Cruiser
- Name: Ericson 29

Boat
- Displacement: 8,500 lb (3,856 kg)
- Draft: 4.33 ft (1.32 m)

Hull
- Type: monohull
- Construction: fiberglass
- LOA: 28.58 ft (8.71 m)
- LWL: 22.00 ft (6.71 m)
- Beam: 9.25 ft (2.82 m)
- Engine: Universal Atomic 4 30 hp (22 kW) gasoline engine

Hull appendages
- Keel: fin keel
- Ballast: 3,900 lb (1,769 kg)
- Rudder: internally-mounted spade-type rudder

Rig
- Rig type: Bermuda rig
- I foretriangle height: 36.50 ft (11.13 m)
- J foretriangle base: 12.24 ft (3.73 m)
- P mainsail luff: 30.54 ft (9.31 m)
- E mainsail foot: 12.04 ft (3.67 m)

Sails
- Sailplan: masthead sloop
- Mainsail area: 183.85 sq ft (17.080 m^{2})
- Jib/genoa area: 223.38 sq ft (20.753 m^{2})
- Total sail area: 407.23 sq ft (37.833 m^{2})

The Ericson 29 is an American sailboat that was designed by Bruce King as a cruiser and first built in 1970.

== Production ==
The design was built by Ericson Yachts in the United States between 1970 and 1978, but it is now out of production.

== Design ==
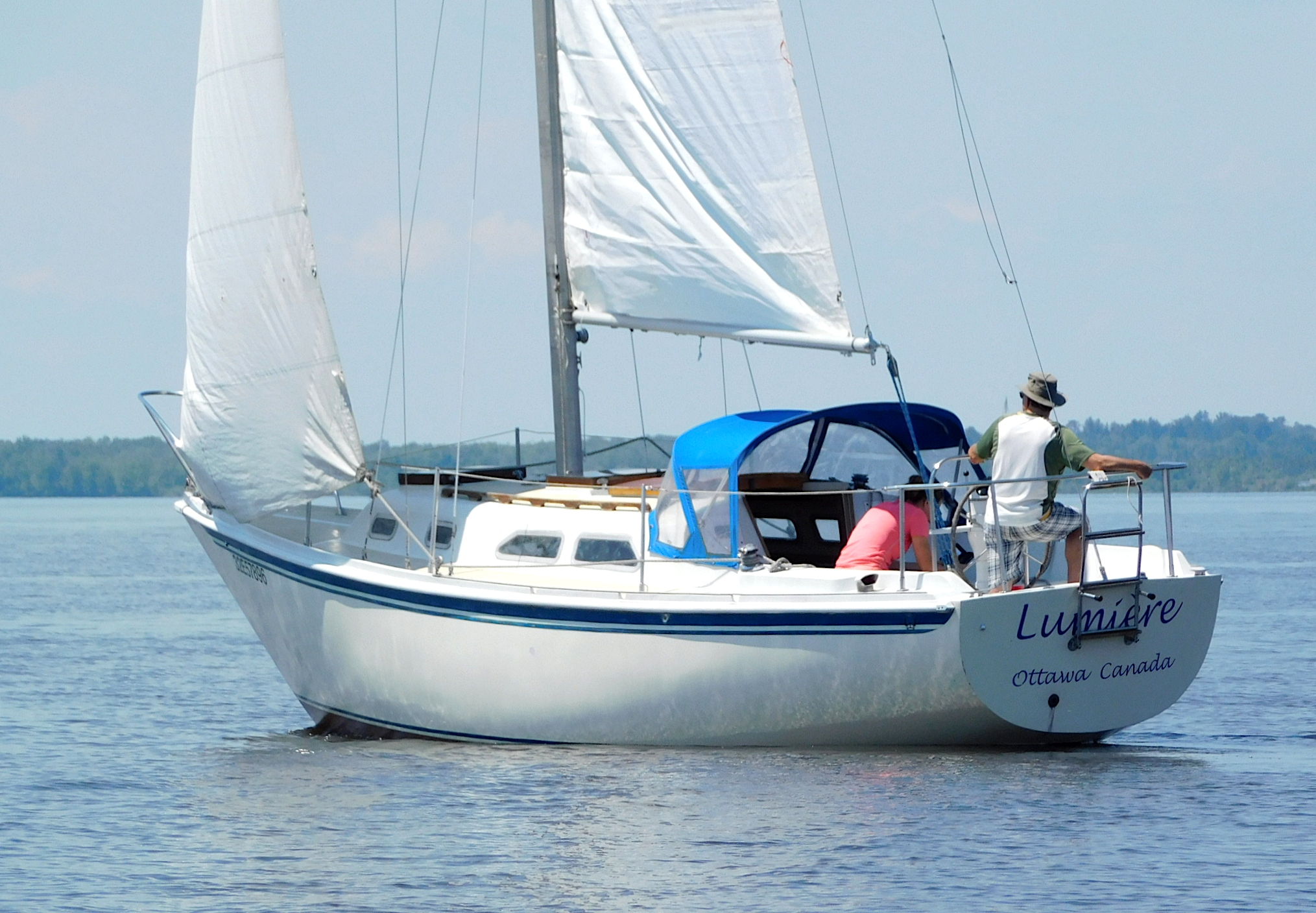
Ericson 29, showing transom

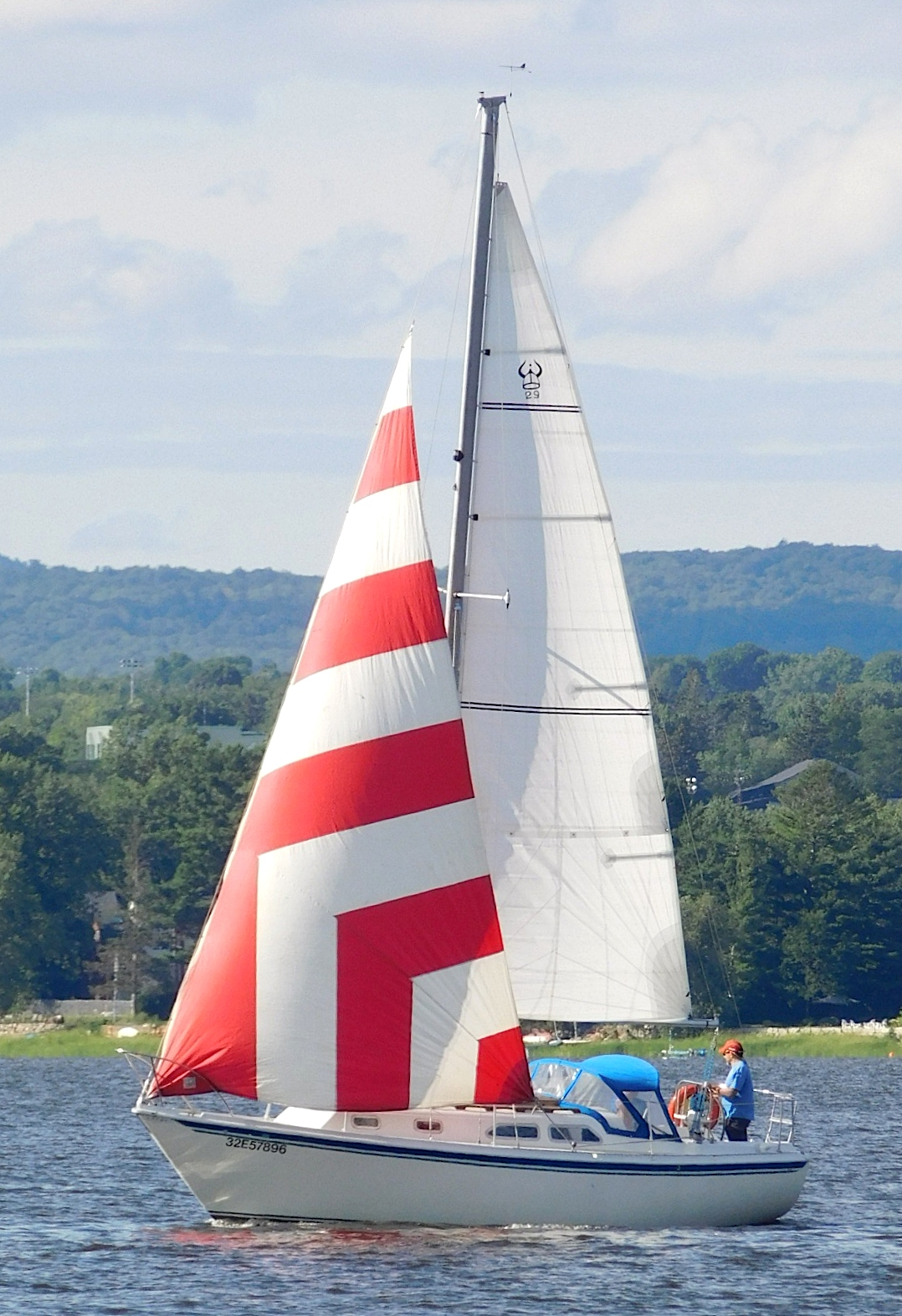
Ericson 29

The Ericson 29 is a recreational keelboat, built predominantly of fiberglass, with wood trim. It has a masthead sloop rig, a raked stem; a raised counter, angled transom; an internally mounted spade-type rudder controlled by a tiller or optional wheel and a fixed fin keel. It displaces 8,500 lb (3,856 kg) and carries 3,900 lb (1,769 kg) of ballast.

A tall rig with mast about 2.0 ft (0.61 m) higher was a factory option for areas with lighter winds.

The boat has a draft of 4.33 ft (1.32 m) with the standard keel.

The boat is fitted with a Universal Atomic 4 30 hp (22 kW) gasoline engine for docking and maneuvering. The fuel tank holds 12 U.S. gallons (45 L; 10.0 imp gal) and the fresh water tank has a capacity of 20 U.S. gallons (76 L; 17 imp gal).

The design has sleeping accommodation for five people, with a double "V"-berth in the bow cabin and two straight settee quarter berths in the main cabin along with a drop-leaf table and one quarter berth aft on the starboard side. The galley is located on the port side just forward of the companionway ladder. The galley is L-shaped and is equipped with an ice box and a sink. The head is located just aft of the bow cabin on the starboard side.

The design has a hull speed of 6.29 kn (11.65 km/h).

== See also ==
- List of sailing boat types
