= Harold J. Osterhof =

American chemist

Harold Judson Osterhof (27 November 1897 – 13 May 1982) was a chemist noted for directing the development of Natsyn, and as the inventor of Pliofilm, a plasticized rubber hydrochloride cast film.

Osterhof obtained his MS in chemistry in 1923 from the University of Michigan, and his PhD in 1927 on the topic of wettability of solids by liquids. In 1929, he began his career at the Goodyear Tire & Rubber Company, from which he retired as director of research in 1966.

In 1971, Osterhof received the Charles Goodyear Medal.
