= Christian Student Fellowship =

- Location: University of Kentucky Lexington, Kentucky
- Country: United States
- Denomination: Non-Denominational
- Website: www.ukcsf.org

History
- Founded: 1958

Administration
- Division: Matt Dampier

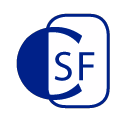
Current logo of CSF

Christian Student Fellowship (or simply known as CSF) is a non-denominational Christian campus ministry at the University of Kentucky. CSF is mainly staffed by recent graduates of UK who give the first year or two years post-graduation to giving back to the UK community by working full-time at CSF. They have a few 'older' people who serve as long-term staff that help guide and invest into these younger staff members. The staff then pours into our student leaders who then pour into campus.

CSF hosts over 150 unique events throughout the year to connect with people at UK. On top of all this, there are dozens of freshmen groups and bible studies, plus 400+ CSF students that meet in weekly "M-groups" for discipleship and accountability. The "M" stands for "Mission".

They are notable for holding the Guinness World Record for the world's largest water balloon fight on August 25, 2008, on Pieratt's Recreational Field at the University of Kentucky. Guinness's Book of World Records official statistics include 58,000 water balloons and a count of 2,744 people.

On August 26, 2011, they broke their own previously standing record with 175,141 water balloons and a count of 8,957 people.
