= Ericson 23-2 =

Sailboat class

Development
- Designer: Bruce King
- Location: United States
- Year: 1975
- No. built: 270
- Builder: Ericson Yachts
- Role: Cruiser
- Name: Ericson 23-2

Boat
- Displacement: 3,100 lb (1,406 kg)
- Draft: 3.67 ft (1.12 m)

Hull
- Type: monohull
- Construction: fiberglass
- LOA: 22.92 ft (6.99 m)
- LWL: 19.50 ft (5.94 m)
- Beam: 7.92 ft (2.41 m)
- Engine: outboard motor

Hull appendages
- Keel: fin keel
- Ballast: 1,200 lb (544 kg)
- Rudder: transom-hung rudder

Rig
- Rig type: Bermuda rig
- I foretriangle height: 29.00 ft (8.84 m)
- J foretriangle base: 10.16 ft (3.10 m)
- P mainsail luff: 25.33 ft (7.72 m)
- E mainsail foot: 7.50 ft (2.29 m)

Sails
- Sailplan: masthead sloop
- Mainsail area: 94.99 sq ft (8.825 m^{2})
- Jib/genoa area: 1,147.32 sq ft (106.590 m^{2})
- Total sail area: 242.31 sq ft (22.511 m^{2})

Racing
- PHRF: 225 (average)

The Ericson 23-2 is an American trailerable sailboat that was designed by Bruce King as a cruiser and first built in 1975.

The design was originally marketed by the manufacturer as the Ericson 23, but is now usually referred to as the Ericson 23-2 to differentiate it from the earlier 1969 Ericson 23-1 design.

== Production ==
The design was built by Ericson Yachts in the United States from 1975 until 1979, with 270 boats completed, but it is now out of production.

== Design ==
The Ericson 23-2 is a recreational keelboat, built predominantly of fiberglass, with wood trim. It has a masthead sloop rig, a raked stem, an angled transom, a transom-hung rudder controlled by a tiller and a fixed fin keel or keel and centerboard. The centerboard model was by far more popular.

The boat is normally fitted with a small 3 to 6 hp (2 to 4 kW) outboard motor for docking and maneuvering.

The design has sleeping accommodation for four people, with a double "V"-berth in the bow cabin and two straight settee quarter berths in the main cabin. The galley is located on the starboard side just forward of the companionway ladder. The galley is equipped with a two-burner stove and a sink. The head is located just aft of the bow cabin on the port side. Cabin headroom is 51 in (130 cm).

The design has a hull speed of 5.9 kn (10.9 km/h).

== Variants ==
Ericson 23-2 fin keel
This model displaces 3,100 lb (1,406 kg) and carries 1,200 lb (544 kg) of lead ballast. The boat has a draft of 3.67 ft (1.12 m) with the standard keel. The boat has a PHRF racing average handicap of 216 to 234, with an average of 225.
Ericson 23-2 keel and centerboard
This model displaces 3,200 lb (1,451 kg) and carries 1,300 lb (590 kg) of ballast. The boat has a draft of 5.16 ft (1.57 m) with the centerboard down and 1.92 ft (0.59 m) with it retracted, allowing operation in shallow water or ground transportation on a trailer. The boat has a PHRF racing average handicap of 222 to 243, with an average of 234.

== Operational history ==
In a 2007 review in Sailing Magazine, John Kretschmer wrote, "both versions of the Ericson 23 are good-looking boats. Each has a sweet, subtle sheerline, moderate freeboard and a sexy, sloping cabintrunk with two small portlights. The most obvious difference between models, aside from the centerboard, is the rudder. MK IIs have a transom-hung rudder while the MK I has the more common rudderpost mounted through the cockpit sole. The MK II deck is also a bit more flush, and the cockpit coaming boards of the MK I were exchanged for molded coamings. Although the MK II has a higher aspect sailplan, the mast on both boats is a beefy aluminum section, especially for a small boat, and is a bit of a load to hoist from the trailer, at least until you get the hang of it. Ericson used the same mast section on its 23, 25 and 27 models. The rig on the MK II translates into around 240 square feet of working sail area and that provides plenty of horsepower for the 3,200-pound Ericson 23. The MK II also came with a fixed keel however, as noted earlier, most were centerboard models. Naturally these latter models were easier for launching from a trailer and the less than 2-foot board-up draft makes the shallowest channels navigable. An optional hoist allows easy adjustment of the rudder, reducing drag downwind and depth for thin water sailing."

== See also ==
- List of sailing boat types
