= Ericson 23-1 =

Sailboat class

Development
- Designer: Bruce King
- Location: United States
- Year: 1969
- No. built: 140
- Builder: Ericson Yachts
- Role: Cruiser
- Name: Ericson 23-1

Boat
- Displacement: 2,700 lb (1,225 kg)
- Draft: 3.67 ft (1.12 m)

Hull
- Type: monohull
- Construction: fiberglass
- LOA: 22.58 ft (6.88 m)
- LWL: 19.17 ft (5.84 m)
- Beam: 7.50 ft (2.29 m)
- Engine: outboard motor

Hull appendages
- Keel: fin keel
- Ballast: 1,300 lb (590 kg)
- Rudder: internally-mounted spade-type rudder

Rig
- Rig type: Bermuda rig
- I foretriangle height: 26.30 ft (8.02 m)
- J foretriangle base: 8.75 ft (2.67 m)
- P mainsail luff: 21.00 ft (6.40 m)
- E mainsail foot: 9.50 ft (2.90 m)

Sails
- Sailplan: masthead sloop
- Mainsail area: 99.75 sq ft (9.267 m^{2})
- Jib/genoa area: 115.06 sq ft (10.689 m^{2})
- Total sail area: 214.72 sq ft (19.948 m^{2})

Racing
- PHRF: 252 (average)

The Ericson 23-1 is an American trailerable sailboat that was designed by Bruce King as a cruiser and first built in 1969.

The design was originally marketed by the manufacturer as the Ericson 23, but is now usually referred to as the Ericson 23-1 to differentiate it from the unrelated 1975 Ericson 23-2 design.

== Production ==
The design was built by Ericson Yachts in the United States from 1969 until 1971, with 140 boats completed, but it is now out of production.

== Design ==
The Ericson 23-1 is a recreational keelboat, built predominantly of fiberglass, with wood trim. It has a masthead sloop rig, a spooned raked stem, a plumb transom, an internally mounted spade-type rudder controlled by a tiller and a fixed fin keel. It displaces 2,700 lb (1,225 kg) and carries 1,300 lb (590 kg) of lead ballast.

The boat has a draft of 3.67 ft (1.12 m) with the standard keel.

The boat is normally fitted with a small 3 to 6 hp (2 to 4 kW) outboard motor for docking and maneuvering.

The design has sleeping accommodation for four people, with a double "V"-berth in the bow cabin and two straight settee quarter berths in the main cabin. The galley is located on the starboard side just forward of the companionway ladder. The galley is equipped with a two-burner stove and a sink. The head is located just aft of the bow cabin on the port side. Cabin headroom is 51 in (130 cm).

The design has a PHRF racing handicap of 222 to 267, with an average of 252. It has a hull speed of 5.9 kn (10.9 km/h).

== Operational history ==
In a 2007 review in Sailing Magazine, John Kretschmer wrote, "although the boat was designed to be trailerable, this was before the advent of the SUV and it was never intended to be hauled behind the family station wagon and dragged up to the lake for weekend outings. It is a real boat masquerading as a trailersailer and most 23s remained happily afloat all season. It is nice, however, to have the option of leaving the boat on a trailer during the off-season, saving ever-increasing yard storage fees. And should you get transferred, downsized, outsourced or just plain sick of sailing in the same place, you can hitch the trailer to a husky vehicle and head to sunnier climes ... The Ericson 23 is an especially handsome boat that is easy and rewarding to sail. It is inexpensive to purchase and maintain. It's a perfect starter boat and as your skills develop it can be raced with some success."

== See also ==
- List of sailing boat types
