= Cancer slope factor =

Cancer slope factors (CSF) are used to estimate the risk of cancer associated with exposure to a carcinogenic or potentially carcinogenic substance. A slope factor is an upper bound, approximating a 95% confidence limit, on the increased cancer risk from a lifetime exposure to an agent by ingestion or inhalation. This estimate, usually expressed in units of proportion (of a population) affected per mg of substance/kg body weight-day, is generally reserved for use in the low-dose region of the dose-response relationship, that is, for exposures corresponding to risks less than 1 in 100.
Slope factors are also referred to as cancer potency factors (PF).

== Toxicity Assessments for Carcinogenic Effects ==
For carcinogens, it is commonly assumed that a small number of molecular events may evoke changes in a single cell that can lead to uncontrolled cellular proliferation and eventually to a clinical diagnosis of cancer. This toxicity of carcinogens is referred to as being "non-threshold" because there is believed to be essentially no level of exposure that does not pose some probability of producing a carcinogenic response, therefore, there is no dose that can be considered to be risk-free. However, some (non-genotoxic) carcinogens may exhibit a threshold whereby doses lower than the threshold do not invoke a carcinogenic response.

When evaluating cancer risks of genotoxic carcinogens, theoretically an effect threshold cannot be estimated. For chemicals that are carcinogens, a two-part evaluation to quantify risk is often employed in which the substance first is assigned a weight-of-evidence classification, and then a slope factor is calculated.

== Generating a Slope Factor ==
When the chemical is a known or probable human carcinogen, a toxicity value that defines quantitatively the relationship between dose and response (i.e., the slope factor) is calculated. Because risk at low exposure levels is difficult to measure directly either by animal experiments or by epidemiologic studies, the development of a slope factor generally entails applying a model to the available data set and using the model to extrapolate from the relatively high doses administered to experimental animals (or the exposures noted in epidemiologic studies) to the lower exposure levels expected for human contact in the environment.

== Data Sets ==
High-quality human data (e.g. high quality epidemiological studies) on carcinogens are preferable to animal data. When human data are limited, the most sensitive species is given the greatest emphasis. Occasionally, in situations where no single study is judged most appropriate, yet several studies collectively support the estimate, the geometric mean of estimates from all studies may be adopted as the slope. This practice ensures the inclusion of all relevant data.

== Weight-of-Evidence Classification for Carcinogens ==
Slope factors are typically calculated for potential carcinogens in classes A, B1, and B2. Quantitative estimation of slope factors for the chemicals in class C proceeds on a case-by-case basis. The slope factor is used in risk assessments to estimate an upper-bound lifetime probability of an individual developing cancer as a result of exposure to a particular level of a potential carcinogen. Slope factors should always be accompanied by the weight of-evidence classification to indicate the strength of the evidence that the agent is a human carcinogen.

- A = Human carcinogen
- B1 = indicates that limited human data are available.
- B2 = indicates sufficient evidence in animals and inadequate or no evidence in humans.
- C = Possible human carcinogen
- D = Not classifiable as to human carcinogenicity
- E = Evidence of non-carcinogenicity for humans

== Calculation of Cancer Risk ==
For each age interval "i", the cancer risk for exposure by a specified pathway is computed as:

$\text{Risk}_i = C \cdot \frac{IR_i \cdot EF_i \cdot ED_i}{BW_i \cdot AT} \cdot SF \cdot ADAF_i$

Where:

C = Concentration of the chemical in the contaminated environmental medium (soil or water) to which the person is exposed. The units are mg/kg for soil and mg/L for water.
IR_{i} = Intake rate of the contaminated environmental medium for age bin "i". The units are kg/day for soil and L/day for water.
BW_{i} = Body weight of the exposed person for age bin "i".
EF_{i} = Exposure frequency for age bin "i" (days/year). This describes how often a person is exposed to the contaminated medium over the course of a typical year.
ED_{i} = Exposure duration for age bin "i" (years). This describes how long a person is exposed to the contaminated medium over the course of their lifetime.
AT = Averaged time, in days. This term specifies the length of time over which the average dose is calculated. For quantifying cancer risk a "lifetime" of 70 years is used (i.e, 70 years times 365 days/year).
SF = Cancer slope factor (mg/kg-day)^{−1}
ADAF = Age-dependent adjustment factor for age bin "i" (unitless)

== Risk Specific Dose (RSD) ==
The Cancer Slope Factor is used to derive the Risk Specific Dose (RSD)(mg/kg-day) for direct-acting carcinogenic agents, those that cause chemical changes (mutations) in DNA. It is also the default choice for carcinogens when there are insufficient data to demonstrate that the mode of action of the chemical is nonlinear. The RSD is often calculated based on a one-in-a-million extra risk (10^{−6} risk) or a one-in-a-hundred-thousand risk (10^{−5} risk) for other-than highly exposed individuals. The term "extra" in the definition of the RSD refers to a risk from environmental exposure to the chemical of interest above the background risk that is always present.

The formula to calculate the RSD for a chemical based on a one-in-a-million extra risk (10^{−6} risk) is: RSD = 0.000001 / CSF

== Potency Factor ==
The CSF is also called a "potency factor" and is used to calculate the Incremental Lifetime Cancer Risk by multiplying the CSF by the chronic daily intake (CDI). The CDI is the dose over a lifetime and is expressed in mg/kg-day.

(see also Risk Equations and Formulas Calculator)
