= Capsize screening formula =

Method of establishing the ability of boats to resist capsizing

The capsize screening formula (CSF) is a controversial method of establishing the ability of boats to resist capsizing. It is defined for sailboats as: Beam / ((Displacement/62.4)^{1/3}), with Displacement measured in pounds, and Beam in feet. A lower figure supposedly indicates greater stability, however the calculation does not consider factors such as hull shape or ballast.

== Background ==
The formula came into being after the 1979 Fastnet race in England where a storm shredded the race fleet. The Cruising Club of America (CCA) put together a technical committee that analyzed race boat data. They came up with the formula to compare boats based on readily available data. The CCA characterizes the formula as "rough".

A lower value is supposed to indicate a sailboat is less likely to capsize. A value of 2 is taken as a cutoff for acceptable to certain race committees. However this is an arbitrary cutoff based on the performance of boats in the 1979 Fastnet race. The CSF does not consider the hull shape or ballast location.

Any two sailboats will have the same CSF value if their displacement and beam are the same. As an example, one could have a light hull with 50% ballast in a bulb at the bottom of an eight foot fin keel, the other could have a heavy hull with 20% ballast in a 2-foot-deep (0.61 m) full-length keel. The stability characteristics of the two sailboats will be drastically different despite the identical CSF value.
