= Katanuki =

Japanese festival activity

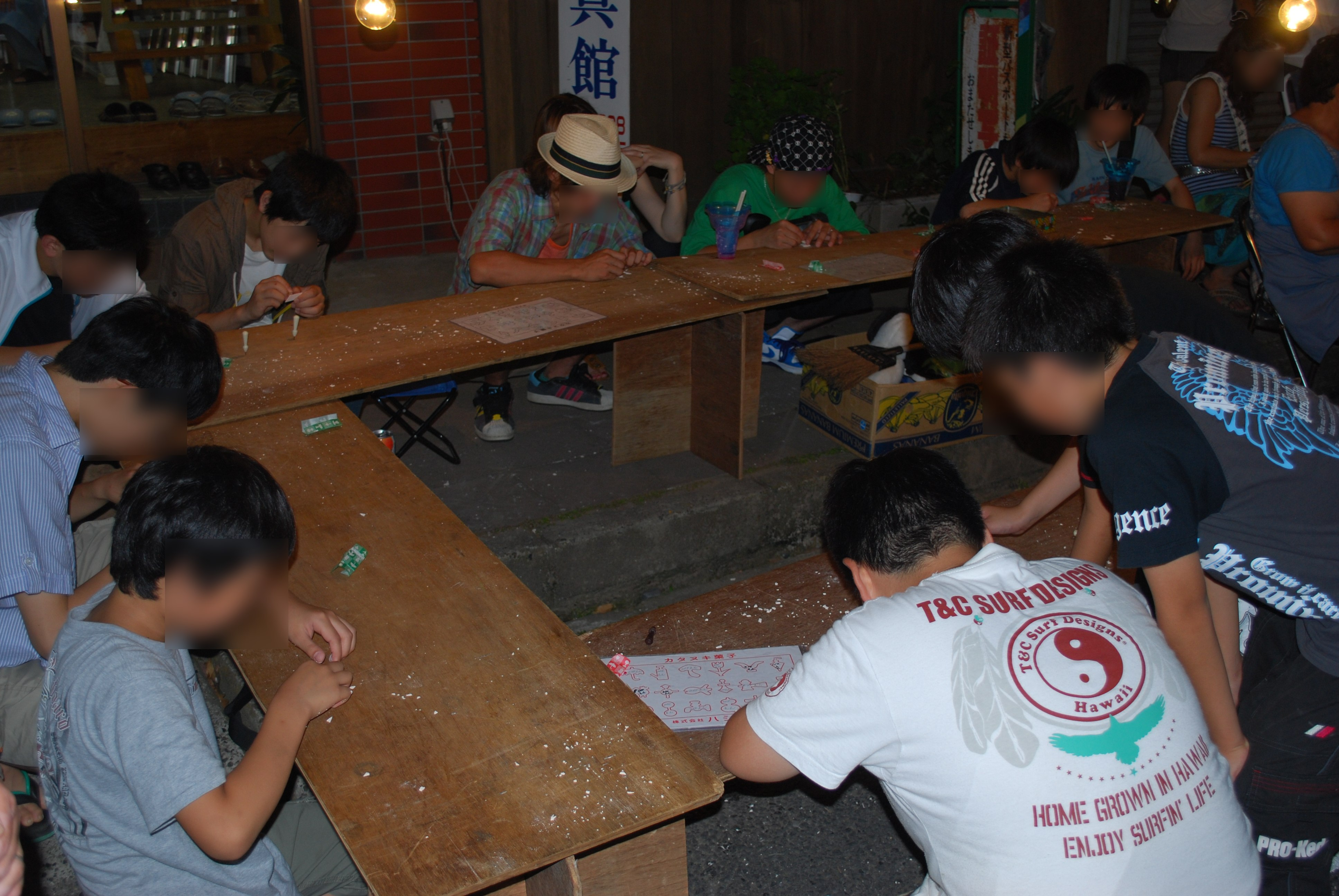
Children doing katanuki

Katanuki (カタヌキ or 型抜き), literally diecutting, is an activity common at Japanese festivals in which a coloured mold of candy made of wheat flour, starch, or sugar, is carved using a needle or toothpick in the shape of an animal, star, a cherry blossom, etc. Those who are able to skillfully carve the mold receive a prize.

== Overview ==
The official name for katanuki is katanukigashi (型抜き菓子, lit. 'diecut candy'), but it is commonly called katanuki (かたぬき) or simply nuki (ぬき). Although it is called diecut candy, it is not made for the purpose of eating. The raw materials are indeed foodstuffs, but because it is not distributed as food, and because it is a health hazard to consume and is not particularly appetizing, it is generally not eaten.

Katanuki was once a regular good carried in carts by tekiya (peddlers) on ennichi (auspicious Shinto days when festivals are often held), but at present, this is becoming less common. A long time ago, it was a side-show at picture story shows (駄菓子屋).

Aside from carts, the molds are sometimes sold at small candy stores, though this is rare.

== See also ==
- Dalgona, a Korean candy which is used in a similar way.
