= Goldfish scooping =

Japanese game

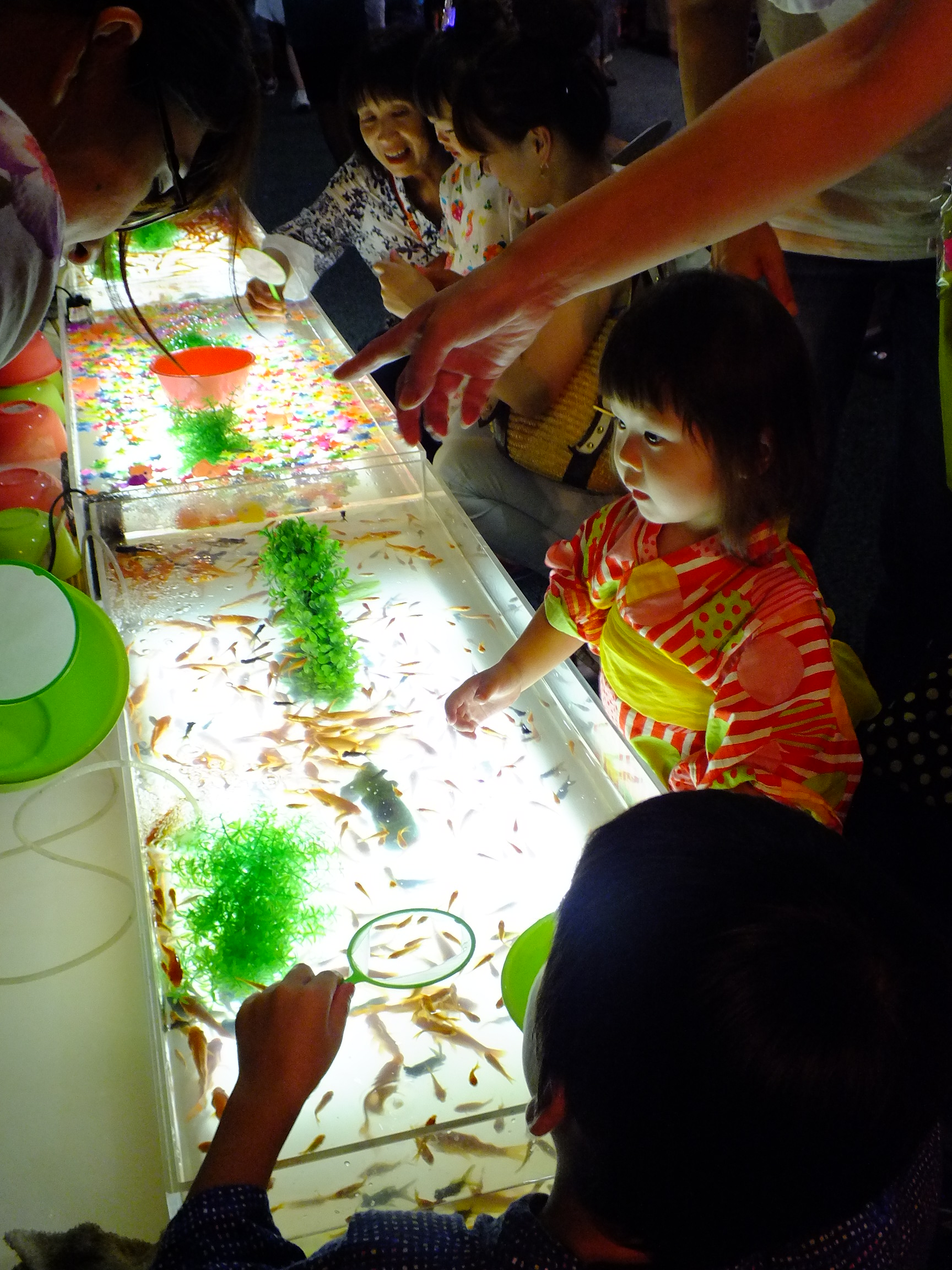
Goldfish scooping in Japan

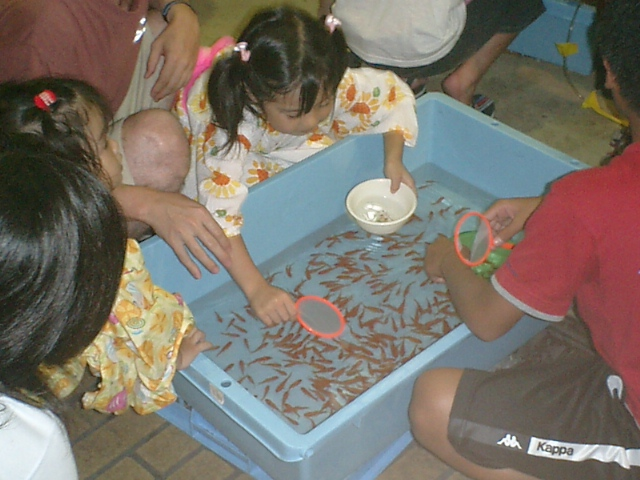
People playing goldfish scooping

Goldfish scooping (金魚すくい, 金魚掬い, Kingyo-sukui) is a traditional Japanese game in which a player scoops goldfish with a paper scooper. It is also called "Scooping Goldfish", "Dipping for Goldfish", or "Snatching Goldfish". Kingyo means "goldfish" and sukui means "scooping". Sometimes bouncy balls are used instead of goldfish. Japanese summer festivals or ennichi commonly have a stall for this activity.

== Rules ==
Video of a young girl trying to scoop up a goldfish

Each person plays individually. The basic rule is that the player scoops goldfish from a pool with a paper scooper called a poi and puts them into a bowl with the poi. This game requires care and speed as the poi can tear easily. The game is over when the poi is completely broken or incapable of scooping properly. Even if one part of the poi is torn, the player can continue the game with the remaining part.

At ennichi or summer festival stalls, the game is not a competition. Participation typically costs around 100 yen and players can take the scooped goldfish home in a plastic bag provided by the stall keeper. The game is unlimited, so players can scoop until their pois are completely broken. If they cannot scoop any goldfish, the stall keeper may be kind enough to give them one or two free goldfish. Each stall usually has its own rules. For example, there are some stalls where players can get a stronger poi if they pay more. Other stalls give players presents if they scoop a lot. In some variations, there are also medaka (Japanese rice fish) that are faster and harder to catch than goldfish. Usually, for every four goldfish, there is one medaka, so in ennichi, if you catch one, it counts as four goldfish.

At the National Goldfish Scooping Championship, players follow official rules that are different from the rules listed above.

=== Pool ===
Usually, the goldfish are placed in a small plastic pool about 1 square metre (11 sq ft) and 20 centimetres (7.9 in) depth.

=== Poi (ポイ, poi) ===
The poi consists of a round plastic frame with a hand grip, and paper on the frame. The poi paper can break easily when put into water, so players should not move the poi too quickly. There are different classes of poi paper. No.7 (7号) is weaker, and No.5 (5号) is stronger. In some stalls, staff have unbreakable poi which consist of a net to scoop goldfish instead of paper.

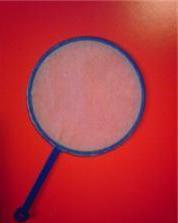
An unused poi

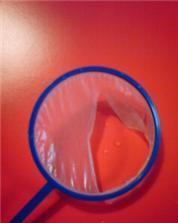
A partly broken poi

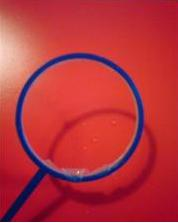
A completely broken poi

=== Bowl ===
The bowl is used to store the scooped goldfish, and is usually made of plastic in a semi-sphere shape with a capacity of about .5 litres (0.88 imp pt; 1.1 US pt).

=== Bag ===
If players get goldfish, they can take them home in bags provided by the stall keeper.

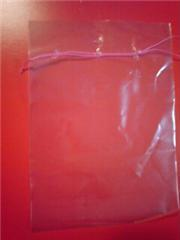
An unused bag

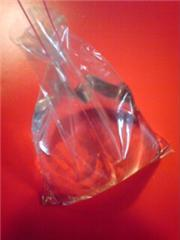
A bag with water

=== Goldfish ===
The varieties of goldfish often used in goldfish scooping are "Koaka", "Demekin", and "Anekin".

== History ==
The game started in the late Edo period, around 1810. In those days, poi were made with nets, and it was a game played by children. Poi came to be made with paper and stalls were started in the Taishō period, around 1910.

The game became more and more popular, and the National Goldfish Scooping Championship began in 1995. The game has become so popular that stalls can be found at many ennichi (縁日, "summer festivals") in Japan.

== Variants ==
Various scooping game variants are found, including turtle scooping (亀掬い、かめすくい, kame-sukui), jelly scooping (ぷよぷよすくい, puyopuyo-sukui), which features small jelly-like rubber balls, super ball scooping (スーパーボールすくい, sūpābōru-sukui), which features bouncy balls, and character scooping (キャラクターすくい, kyarakutā-sukui), which features small plastic figurines in the shapes of various cartoon characters, particularly manga and anime.

== National Goldfish Scooping Championship ==
The National Goldfish Scooping Championship (全国金魚すくい選手権大会) is the biggest official competition managed by the National Goldfish Scooping Association and Yamatokōriyama city in Nara Prefecture (Yamatokōriyama is famous for producing goldfish). It is held on the third Saturday and Sunday in August every year. In 2007, the 13th championship was held and 1116 people participated in it. It consisted of three sections:

- Children section: competition by children who are under 15
- General section: competition by people ages 15 and up
- Group section: competition for the sum number of the goldfish scooped by a team of three people

There are area trials and the first and second in every section can participate in National Championship. Extraordinarily in the Nara trials, 60 people in the child section, 80 people in the ordinary section and 40 groups in the group section can participate. The rules are detailed and include the size of goldfish, poi and pool, and the number of umpires. Contestants compete for the number of goldfish scooped in three minutes. If the paper of poi is completely broken, the game is over and the score is the number of goldfish scooped until then.

In the tenth championship (2004) a player scooped 61 goldfish in three minutes in the semifinal, a new high and averaging one goldfish per three seconds.

In 2011, 2,400 players competed. The team title went to 3 players who scooped 173 goldfish.
