= Jack Abramoff CNMI scandal =

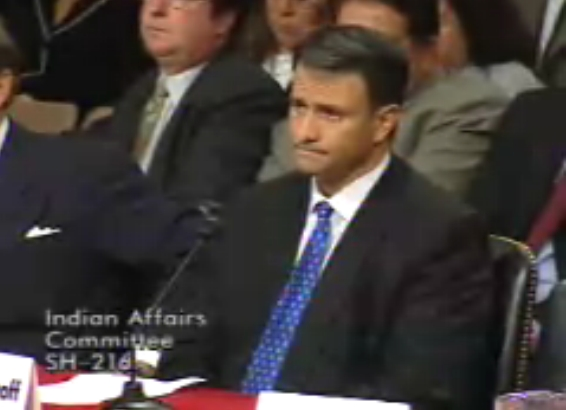
Jack Abramoff in 2004

The Jack Abramoff CNMI scandal involved the efforts of Jack Abramoff, other lobbyists, and government officials to change or prevent, or both, Congressional action regarding the Commonwealth of the Northern Mariana Islands (CNMI) and businesses on Saipan, its capital, commercial center, and one of its three principal islands.

Among the issues he worked on was keeping Congress from imposing the federal minimum wage for workers in the CNMI.

== Background ==
Abramoff took on the Northern Mariana Islands as a client in 1995. Abramoff and his law firm were paid at least $6.7 million by the CNMI government from 1995 to 2001.

The CNMI is a US commonwealth and thus may apply the "Made in USA" label to goods manufactured on Saipan.

Frank Murkowski, then Republican Senator from Alaska and chairman of the Senate Energy and Natural Resources Committee, submitted a bill to extend the protection of U.S. minimum-wage labor laws to the workers in the CNMI.

In testimony before the United States Senate, it was described that 91% of the private-sector workforce were immigrants, and were being paid barely half the U.S. minimum hourly wage. Stories also emerged of workers forced to live behind barbed wire in squalid shacks without plumbing. A Department of the Interior report found that "Chinese women were subject to forced abortions and that women and children were subject to forced prostitution in the local sex-tourism industry." The Senate passed the Murkowski worker reform bill unanimously, but the bill was then blocked by Tom DeLay in the House.

== Lobbying ==
In 1993, the government of the CNMI hired Preston Gates to lobby for it. Between October 1993 and September 2001, the firm was paid about $6.7 million by the CNMI government, about 72% of the government's overall lobbying payments. The CNMI government was one of the firm's biggest clients.

In 1995, Abramoff, employed at Preston Gates, took on the CNMI as a client. The government sought to retain exemptions from U.S. immigration and minimum wage laws.

In October 1996, the contract with Preston Gates expired. The CNMI government broke its own laws by continuing to pay the firm - The initial Preston Gates contract with CNMI was from June 1, 1995 - June 30, 1996, for about $860,000. After the expiration of the contract, then-Governor Froilan C. Tenorio's office continued to pay Preston Gates, despite the lack of a valid contract, until January 11, 1998 when Governor Pedro P. Tenorio had been inaugurated, a grand total of $5.21 million. (Between October 1996 to October 1997, the total was just over $3 million.) The payment without contract was later judged illegal in an investigation by the CNMI Office of the Public Auditor.

Abramoff later arranged an all-expenses paid trip to Saipan for Tom DeLay on New Year's Eve in 1997. Although House ethics rules at the time prohibited House members from accepting such gifts from lobbyists, the trip was funded directly by the CNMI and thus was technically allowable. An internal memo from Preston, Gates, and Ellis stated that these sorts of trips are "one of the most effective ways to build permanent friends on the Hill." While on the trip, at a benefit dinner for Willie Tan of Tan Holdings Corporation, DeLay was quoted as saying:

When one of my closest and dearest friends, Jack Abramoff, your most able representative in Washington, D.C., invited me to the islands, I wanted to see firsthand the free-market success and the progress and reform you have made."

An undercover investigation by ABC News captured Willie Tan speaking on a hidden camera about a conversation with DeLay about labor reform laws. According to Tan, "[DeLay] said, 'Willie, if they elect me majority whip, I make the schedule of the Congress, and I'm not going to put it on the schedule.' So Tom told me, 'Forget it, Willie. No chance.'"

After the trip, Abramoff helped DeLay craft policy that extended exemptions from federal immigration and minimum-wage labor laws to Saipan industries, though the island is part of the U.S. Commonwealth. Brian Ross at ABC News for 20/20 on March 13, 1998 alleged that factories on Saipan have forced their workers to have abortions in order to keep their jobs.

In addition, Abramoff's lobbying team helped Rep. Ralph Hall (R-TX) craft statements attacking the credibility of "Katrina," a teenaged sex slave whom federal officials relocated to Hawaii and who testified to federal investigators and Congress about the sex trade on that island, in the process forestalling a federal criminal prosecution.

Abramoff also negotiated a $1.2 million no-bid contract from the Marianas for 'promoting ethics in government' to be awarded to David Lapin, brother of Daniel Lapin.

Abramoff also allegedly paid the expenses for at least two other trips to the Marianas. In both cases, Abramoff was reimbursed by Preston Gates & Ellis, which was then being paid by the Marianas government.

The first trip involved two aides to Tom DeLay, Edwin A. Buckham and Tony Rudy, both who later joined the lobbying firm Alexander Strategy Group. Buckham and Rudy traveled with Abramoff from December 4 to December 12, 1996. Abramoff paid at least $3,000 of the costs, according to a memo written by his assistant Jennifer Senft Hamann. The second trip involved James E. Clyburn (D-SC) and Bennie Thompson (D-MS). In a letter dated December 17, 1996, the National Security Caucus Foundation invited the lawmakers to attend a trip to the island in January 1997, saying that the government would incur no expense. Non-profits are allowed to pay for lawmaker travel, and Clyburn and Thompson said they believed the NSCF was doing so. Greg Hilton, the director of the NSCF at the time, has said that Preston Gates & Ellis sent him the airline tickets and told him the government had paid for them. The cost of the trip was, according to an Abramoff memo, $15,657. The lawmakers said that they never met Abramoff nor knew of his involvement.

== Contract suspended and renewed ==
Abramoff's lobbying contract with the CNMI was suspended in late 1998 due to a January change in administration and financial problems. In December 1999, allegedly at the request of CNMI politician Benigno R. Fitial, Edwin A. Buckham and Michael Scanlon visited the CNMI intending to convince two legislators to support Fitial for speaker of the CNMI's 18-member House of Representatives. Scanlon was still a member of Tom DeLay's congressional staff, and was on unpaid leave at the time. Buckham and Scanlon extended promises to help deliver federal aid to the legislators' districts, and succeeded in convincing the two Democratic legislators to vote for Fitial, a member of the rival Covenant Party. After Fitial was elected speaker in January 2000, he wrote the governor insisting that the islands contract again with Abramoff at Preston Gates & Ellis.

In August 1999, Abramoff's firm, Greenberg Traurig (which, all told, received $4.04 million from 1998 to 2002 from the Commonwealth), hired Millennium Marketing (a division of the Ralph Reed-founded Century Strategies) to "sen[d] out a mailer to Alabama conservative Christians asking them to call then-Rep. Bob Riley (R-Ala.) and tell him to vote against legislation that would have made the CNMI subject to federal minimum wage laws. "The radical left, the Big Labor Union Bosses, and Bill Clinton want to pass a law preventing Chinese from coming to work on the Marianas Islands," the mailer from Reed's firm said. The Chinese workers, it added, "are exposed to the teachings of Jesus Christ" while on the islands, and many "are converted to the Christian faith and return to China with Bibles in hand."

In February 1999, a congressional delegation visited the CNMI; it included Representative John Doolittle, who would get significantly more involved in 2001. Doolittle and Representative Joel Hefley write in June 1999, a "Dear Colleague" letter, saying that a May 1999 show on ABC's newsmagazine, 20/20, "The Shame of Saipan", had numerous inaccuracies, and that "Tom DeLay has consistently engaged government leaders in taking steps toward reform in the Mariana Islands to ensure and maintain a vibrant economy under local control."

By late July 2000, Abramoff and Preston Gates were hired again, for $100,000 a month.

In January 2001 Abramoff switched lobbying firms to Greenberg Traurig. "'Our standing with the new administration promises to be solid as several friends of the CNMI (islands) will soon be taking high-ranking positions in the Administration, including within the Interior Department,' Abramoff wrote in a January 2001 letter in which he persuaded the island government to follow him as a client to his new lobbying firm, Greenberg Traurig." In January 2006, CNMI Governor Benigno Fitial demanded that Preston Gates & Ellis and Greenberg Traurig return much of the money originally paid for lobbying services, claiming that "the positive benefits of those services have been undone by the wide scandal brought on by the criminal charges against Abramoff."

In August 2006, Roger Stillwell, formerly an employee of the Department of the Interior, pleaded guilty to a misdemeanor charge of failing to report gifts received from Abramoff during the period that Abramoff was lobbying the Interior on behalf of the Commonwealth of the Marianas Islands.

In April 2008, the US Senate campaign of Republican Bob Schaffer was rocked by reports of Schaffer's participation in a 1999 trip with his wife to the CNMI organized by Preston-Gates, and paid for by the Traditional Values Coalition. Schaffer later used his position on the House Resources Committee to attack reports of abuses on the islands.
