= Harbour Group =

American lobbying and public relations firm

The Harbour Group, LLC is a Washington D.C. lobbying and public relations firm.

== History ==
Harbour Group was founded in 2001 by former Clinton administration senior advisor for policy and communications Joel Johnson, who left in 2005 to join the Glover Park Group, and Richard Marcus, who continued to lead it as of 2018.

Harbour Group formerly worked with the Alexander Strategy Group to provide access to Washington, D.C. decision makers, according to ASG's website, before ASG was dissolved in late 2005. The Harbour Group was associated with Swidler Berlin Shereff Friedman LLP, a Washington, D.C.–based law firm, until February 28, 2006, when that firm merged with Bingham McCutchen LLP.

On September 27, 2001, Belle Haven Consultants, a Hong Kong consulting firm run by principals at The Heritage Foundation, hired the Alexander Strategy Group to represent Malaysian interests. According to U.S. Senate lobbying records, Belle Haven paid ASG US$620,000 over two years "on behalf of unspecified Malaysian business interests seeking to present a positive image of their country in the United States". Belle Haven also paid the Harbour Group, the Western Strategy Group, and a third lobbying firm another $640,000 to represent Malaysian interests at the same time.

In 2021, the public affairs company Finsbury Glover Hering announced that it would be acquiring Harbour Group.
