= U.S. Family Network =

U.S. Family Network, Inc. (USFN) was founded in 1996 by Ed Buckham, who also served as the organization's consultant. USFN was a tax-exempt 501(c)(4) corporation founded in Virginia, with its principal offices located in the District of Columbia in the same building as Buckham's consulting firm Alexander Strategy Group and Tom DeLay's political action committee Americans for a Republican Majority (ARMPAC). USFN received $500,000 from the NRCC and $1 million from lobbyist Jack Abramoff's Russian clients.

Much of the money went to Buckham and his wife, Alexander Strategy Group, and a 15-year lease on a Washington Redskins skybox used by Abramoff. The group closed in 2001 while under a Federal Election Commission probe, distributing several hundred thousands of dollars in remaining assets among people associated with USFN. The townhouse was sold at below market value to U.S. Representative Jim Ryun (R-KS).

The activities of USFN are under investigation by the Justice Department; a subpoena for USFN documents was issued in February 2006, naming Abramoff, Tony Rudy and his wife Lisa, Tom DeLay and his wife Christine, Buckham and his wife Wendy, Ralph Reed, and Grover Norquist.

== Financial connections with Jack Abramoff ==
The U.S. Family Network was largely funded by clients of embattled lobbyist Jack Abramoff. Payments to the group of up to $1 million coincided with votes and other actions taken by Tom DeLay in Congress in favor of the "donors."

Northern Marianas Islands tycoon Willie Tan, an Abramoff client, gave USFN $650,000.

$364,500 in donations to USFN from firms associated with Abramoff were in turn given to the Alexander Strategy Group.

== DeLay's financial connections ==
The Dubya Report reported April 20, 2005 (updated December 29, 2005), that in 1998, the Democratic Congressional Campaign Committee "filed a Racketeer Influenced Corrupt Organizations (RICO) lawsuit against DeLay and his fundraising operations. DeLay's operation had begun in 1994 when Newt Gingrich slashed DeLay's budget as House Whip. DeLay responded by setting up an organization of his own that would extend his power by contributing to the political campaigns of his colleagues. He hired tobacco lobbyist and anti-union activist Karl Gallant, and induced Enron's Ken Lay to contribute $500,000 to ARMPAC. Enron also came up with a $750,000 consulting contract for Gallant and DeLay chief of staff Ed Buckham. Buckham would later set up his own lobbying firm, the Alexander Strategy Group, which boasted DeLay's wife Christine, a retired schoolteacher, on its staff at a $40,000 a year salary.

"Also named in the RICO suit was Robert G. Mills. Prior to running DeLay's 1996 campaign, Mills worked for the Council for Government Reform, from which he reportedly stole $35,000. Before that he had worked for United Conservatives of America, which was investigated by the Federal Election Commission who believed that UCA's huge debts were being used to hide illegal corporate donations. In 1998 Mills represented an organization called the US Family Network, registered as a 501(c)(4) 'social welfare' organization focused on Christian conservatives. Also on the staff of US Family Network was Ed Buckham's wife, at a salary of $59,000 a year.

"By 1999 Mills had left US Family Network, but Buckham, an ordained minister remained. The Network made headlines as the recipient of the largest single donation the National Republican Congressional Caucus ever made, $500,000. The check was cut by Virginia Congressman and DeLay crony Tom Davis, NRCC chair, but was never approved by the executive committee. The RICO suit alleged that US Family Network existed to hide the source and control of donated funds. The Washington journal Roll Call speculated that the group also existed to make statements and take actions on behalf of (or in opposition to) candidates that the NRCC would be embarrassed to do directly.

"The other 'associated organizations' named in the RICO suit were: the Republican Majority Issues Committee (RMIC), which, like US Family Network, was designed to provide (possibly) legal money laundering for political contributions, and Americans for Economic Reform. The suit alleged that DeLay and his cohorts were 'extorting' money from people with a stake in federal legislation."

Robert Dreyfuss wrote in the February 4, 2000, Texas Observer that in Fall 1999, according to Roll Call, the NRCC gave the Network the $500,000 to "turn out conservative Christian voters on election day."

Additionally, on April 28, 2000, the Texas Observer reported that the "editors at Roll Call hired a tax accountant and consulted industry and academic authorities. Yet no one could figure why a 'grassroots lobbying' political action committee linked to Tom DeLay has raised $1.3 million from only five donors – then spent the money to buy a D.C. townhouse and a truck (registered at Buckham's home), and to lease a skybox at the Redskins stadium for fifteen years.

"Roll Call describe[d] U.S. Family Network as one of a 'web of interlocking groups revolving around DeLay and Ed Buckham, his former chief of staff and top political advisor.'"

The firm Liberty Consulting, owned by Tony Rudy's wife Lisa, was paid $15,600 by the U.S. Family Network in 1999 and $10,400 in 2000.

== Nature of organization ==
"The fifteen-year lease on the skybox suggests that the group is doing a different kind of grassroots lobbying. Frances Hill, a University of Pennsylvania professor, who studies the political activities of tax-exempt groups, seemed bewildered by the group’s lobbying. 'What I can’t figure out is what type of lobbying they are doing,' Hill said. 'Usually a (c)4 is going to do expertise-type lobbying, which includes studies, reports and press conferences and publicly disseminating information. . . . They may have invented a way to turn lobbying into an entertainment activity, rather than an information activity. Have they really found a way to make direct lobbying a means to maintain what looks like a slush fund?'

"Hill also questioned the amount of money U.S. Family spent on fundraising: $665,863 in expenses in 1998, with 60 percent of it going to fundraising and consulting. In 1998 Buckham told Roll Call that he held the fundraising contract and raised money all over the country for U.S. Family. But fundraising in 1998 should not have been so labor-intensive and costly. One donor gave the group $1 million, and other large contributions included a $150,000, a $100,000, and two gifts of $50,000 – not the sort of contributions that require a big investment in mass mail and phone banks. 'They’re not mailing,' Hill said. 'They are going to the skybox. And one assumes that ordinary citizens are not going there.' (The PAC withholds the names of its donors.) The PAC’s mission statement on its tax return is the 'Promotion of social welfare for American Families' and funding projects to 'promote sound family values legislation.' The skybox, according to Thomas Susman, a lobbying law expert consulted by Roll Call, 'wouldn’t be grassroots.'"

== Registered lobbyists ==
- U.S. Family Network, Inc. holds lobbyist ID Number 34945000 in the U.S. House of Representatives.
- On July 27, 2001, the State of Pennsylvania issued a cease and desist order against the US Family Network, which was listed among those organizations that could not "legally solicit contributions in Pennsylvania until they register[ed] with the bureau or provide[d] the bureau with evidence that they are excluded or exempt from the law."
