= Tom Davis (Virginia politician) =

American politician (born 1949)

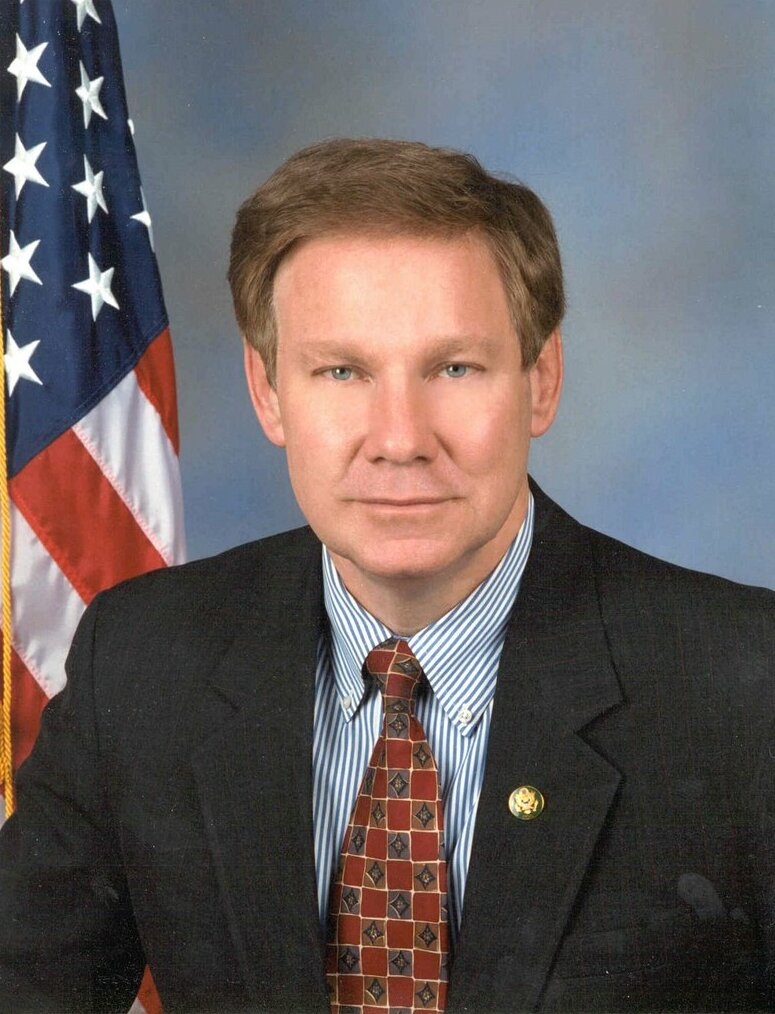

Chair of the House Oversight Committee
- In office January 3, 2003 – January 3, 2007
- Preceded by: Dan Burton
- Succeeded by: Henry Waxman

Chair of the National Republican Congressional Committee
- In office January 3, 1999 – January 3, 2003
- Preceded by: John Linder
- Succeeded by: Tom Reynolds

Member of the U.S. House of Representatives from Virginia's 11th district
- In office January 3, 1995 – November 24, 2008
- Preceded by: Leslie Byrne
- Succeeded by: Gerry Connolly

Chair of the Fairfax County Board of Supervisors
- In office 1991–1994
- Preceded by: Audrey Moore
- Succeeded by: Katherine Hanley

Member of the Fairfax County Board of Supervisors from the Mason district
- In office 1980–1991
- Preceded by: ???
- Succeeded by: Christine Trapnell

Personal details
- Born: Thomas Milburn Davis III; January 5, 1949 (age 77) Minot, North Dakota, U.S.
- Party: Republican
- Spouse(s): Margaret Rantz (m. 1973; div. 2003) Jeannemarie Devolites (m. 2004)
- Children: 3
- Education: Amherst College (BA); University of Virginia (JD)

Military service
- Branch/service: United States Army
- Years of service: 1971–1972 (active); 1972–1979 (inactive)
- Unit: Virginia Army National Guard; United States Army Reserve
- Davis's voice Davis opening a House Oversight Committee hearing on the 9/11 Commission's final report. Recorded August 3, 2004

Thomas Milburn Davis III (born January 5, 1949) is an American politician and lobbyist who served as the U.S. representative for Virginia's 11th congressional district from 1995 until his resignation in 2008. A member of the Republican Party, he announced on January 30, 2008, that he would not seek re-election to an eighth term. Davis resigned from Congress on November 24, 2008, and was succeeded by Democrat Gerry Connolly.

From 2008 to 2018, he was a director of federal government affairs at Deloitte. In August 2014, he was named as rector (head of the Board of Visitors) of George Mason University and a trustee of its Krasnow Institute for Advanced Study and served until 2019. In January 2019, Davis began work as a partner in the law firm Holland and Knight.

== Early life and education ==
Davis was born in Minot, North Dakota, and moved to Fairfax County in Virginia at an early age. He was a U.S. Senate Page and graduated as president of the senior class at the United States Capitol Page School in 1967. He is a graduate of Amherst College and the University of Virginia School of Law. He attended Officer Candidate School of the U.S. Army, served on active duty, and spent eight years with the Virginia National Guard and the U.S. Army Reserve.

== Early career ==
He is the former vice president and general counsel at government contractor PRC, Inc., former chairman of the Northern Virginia Transportation Commission, and former president of the Washington Metropolitan Council of Governments.

== Political career ==
Davis was a member of the Fairfax County Board of Supervisors from 1980 to 1994, serving as chairman of the Board of Supervisors from 1991 until his election to the House. During his service as board chairman, Fairfax County was ranked first financially by City and State magazine in their list of Top 50 Counties.

=== Congressional career ===
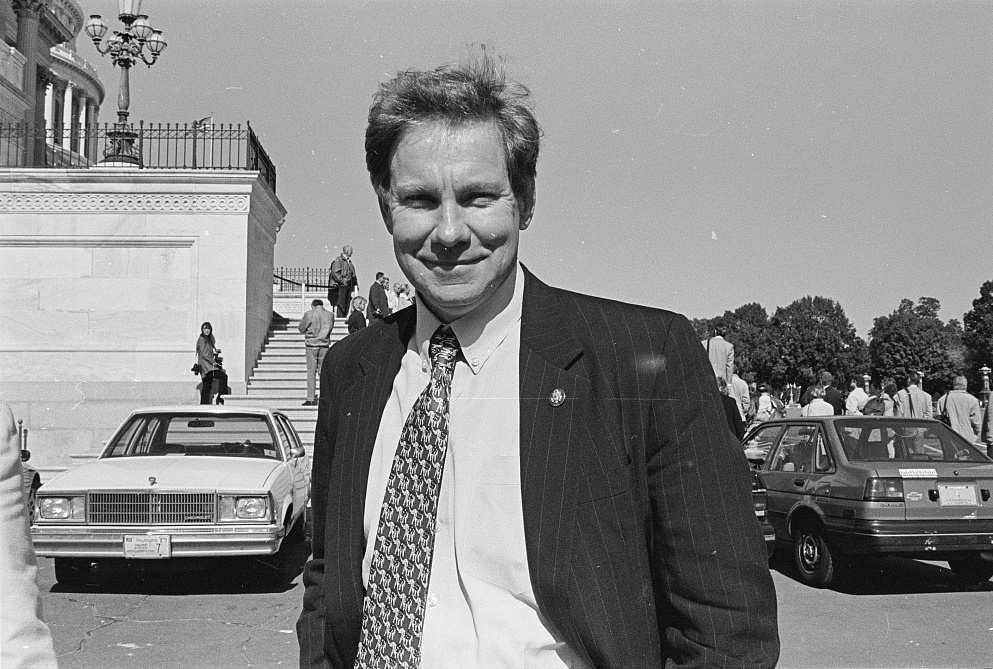
Davis outside the east front of the Capitol in 1997

Davis won election to the House in 1994, the year of the Republican Contract with America. Davis defeated one-term incumbent Leslie Byrne. The Contract with America called for citizen-legislators who would retire after 12 years, instead of career politicians. Davis signed the Contract and voted in favor of the Citizens Legislature Act; however, the bill did not achieve support from the 2/3 majority needed for the amendment to pass. Although the 11th was considered a swing district, Davis was reelected five more times without substantive opposition in part due to his popularity in Fairfax County. Democrats did not field a candidate against him in 1998 and 2002.

In the 2006 Democratic wave, when Democrats took the House for the first time since 1994, Davis faced an unexpectedly strong challenge from Democrat Andrew Hurst, but was reelected with 55 percent of the vote, which was his lowest total since his initial bid against Byrne. Nonetheless, he began fundraising for a Senate bid in 2007. In his 2004 term, on what the Washington Post deemed to be his then-most recent "key votes", Davis voted 10 times out of the last 13 times (77 percent) for the Republican Party position. On a series of 1,700 votes reported by The Washington Post, Davis voted over 89 percent of the time in favor of the Republican position. Nevertheless, Davis was sometimes described as a moderate; he supported some abortion rights and voting rights for the District of Columbia, and opposed a state car tax phase-out in 2006.

Davis was chairman of the National Republican Congressional Committee (NRCC) from 1998 to 2002. According to The Federal Paper, he then sought the chairmanship of the House Government Oversight and Reform Committee. Davis had less seniority than the other contenders for this chairmanship, but some Republicans wanted to reward him for his work as NRCC chairman, including his supervision of a $160 million fundraising effort. Davis's deputy on the NRCC, Tom Reynolds of New York, became the next NRCC chairman.

=== House Committee on Government Reform ===
In 2003, Davis became Chairman of the House Government Reform Committee. He served as Chairman until 2007, when Democrats became the majority party in the House of Representatives. Henry Waxman of California replaced Davis at the gavel. Davis had renamed the committee, removing "Oversight" from the title; one of Waxman's first acts as Chair was to reinstitute the name as the House Committee on Oversight and Government Reform. The committee was the chief investigative and oversight committee of the House, and was granted broad jurisdiction. This committee was very active during the Clinton administration. It issued 1,052 subpoenas to probe alleged misconduct by the administration and the Democratic Party between 1997 and 2002. By contrast, by the end of the 2005 session, Davis and the majority had only permitted three subpoenas to be issued to the George W. Bush administration, including one to the United States Department of Defense over documents related to Hurricane Katrina.

==== ICG government ====
Davis's second wife, Jeannemarie Devolites-Davis, was one of the first hires (as a part-time consultant) for ICG Government, a firm that assists businesses in understanding procuring government contracts. Their financial relationship, along with financial ties that benefit family members of 64 of the 435 voting members of Congress, was highlighted in the June 2007 ethics report, "Family Affair" by the CREW.

At the time of her hire at ICG, Davis was her mentor and campaign manager. After being hired, Devolites married Davis. On July 28, 2006, the Washington Post reported that the Defense Information Systems Agency had reviewed its satellite contract with Artel, Inc., and the agency had preliminarily determined that the contract was ineffective and expensive. Artel then hired ICG for consulting services. ICG drafted a letter Davis signed to the agency threatening an investigation by his committee if the contract was not awarded. After the Post articles appeared, Davis sought an opinion from the House Ethics Committee. They advised him to be careful to avoid the appearance of any conflict in this matter. The Post published an extensive article on the issue, the company had to register as a lobbyist, and ICG removed a picture from the front page of its website of Davis speaking to ICG clients.

His wife continued to work for ICG, which paid her $78,000 in 2005 for working 10 to 20 hours a week, primarily at home on her cell phone. She was making $18,000 a year as a Virginia legislator. Her bio was the only one on the ICG site to name her spouse. The same Post writers continued the investigation of oversight of contractual influence by the committee and its chair in November and December 2006.

==== Major League Baseball team in Washington ====
Davis was accused of threatening Major League Baseball with an investigation when a consortium that included George Soros offered to buy the Washington Nationals. "I think Major League Baseball understands the stakes", Davis told Roll Call magazine. "I don't think they want to get involved in the political fights." Davis, who convened some congressional hearings about steroid use, added, "I don't think it's the Nats that get hurt. I think it's Major League Baseball that gets hurt. They enjoy all sorts of exemptions from antitrust laws."

==== Transportation development positions ====
Davis also appeared at a local zoning meeting to oppose a "smart growth" plan near the Vienna Metro station. Approval of the project, to build what was called a "mini-city" within walking distance of the Metro, was considered routine. Some of the longest commutes to work in the nation begin in Virginia—second only to New York City—and in Prince William County in particular. The project was a key resolution to congestion in the congressional district. Davis's pledge to approve the legislation led several county supervisors to accuse him of meddling in a local land-use issue.

One politician who spoke to Davis said the congressman told him that he opposed Pulte Homes' MetroWest project because "all it does is produce Democrats".

In July 2006, Davis wrote a letter to Virginia's then-Governor Tim Kaine discouraging the state from constructing an underground Metrorail through Tysons Corner. According to a July 17, 2006, story in The Washington Post, Davis said switching to a tunnel in Tysons would require reviews that could delay the rail line by as much as two years. On February 26, 2007, The Post reported that Davis had switched positions.

==== Jennifer and David Safavian ====
One of 12 counsels for oversight and investigations on the House Government Reform Committee was Jennifer Safavian, wife of David Safavian, the first person convicted in the Jack Abramoff lobbying scandal. She is now the Staff Director for the House Ways and Means Committee. A former legislative director for Davis submitted a request that he receive no jail time, but the judge ruled David Safavian's conduct merited incarceration. The judge's decision was reversed on June 17, 2008, by the Court of Appeals for the District of Columbia.

David Safavian had replaced Angela Styles, who was forced from the General Services Administration after Davis wrote letters to her bosses at the Office of Management and Budget. He had written to Mitchell E. Daniels Jr. and Joshua Bolten, Styles's superiors at the Office of Management and Budget.

Prior to his GSA job, Safavian had no government contracts experience. He did have connections to Davis, as a lobbyist with Grover Norquist, head of Americans for Tax Reform (ATR), he worked closely with the NRCC when Davis was chair, and presented Davis with an ATR award." ATR has been found to have operated as tax-exempt despite not qualifying for tax-exempt status.

=== Schiavo subpoena ===
Among notable controversies involving the committee under Davis was the Terri Schiavo case. The committee subpoena, signed by Davis, ordered the appearance of Schiavo, her husband, Michael, and her doctors. The subpoenas specified that the witnesses bring to the hearing "all medical and other equipment that provides nutrition and hydration...in its current and continuing state of operations." Davis issued a joint statement with House Majority Leader Tom DeLay (R-TX) and Speaker of the House Dennis Hastert (R-IL) that stated: "This inquiry should give hope to Terri, her parents and friends, and the millions of people throughout the world who are praying for her safety. This fight is not over." Many legal scholars criticized this action as an inappropriate congressional intervention in an ongoing court case that defied the rule of law and amounted to a bill of attainder—not against the party the politicians are attempting to aid, but against the party on the other side of the courtroom.

=== K Street Project and NRCC fundraising ===
As chairman of the NRCC, Davis's chief responsibility was fundraising for members of Congress, and his work overlapped with the financial efforts of the Republican Party's K Street Project and the fundraising scandals involving Abramoff and DeLay. Davis himself signed an NRCC check for $500,000 in 1999, the largest amount donated by the NRCC, while he was chair of the committee. The NRCC was fined by the Federal Election Commission for transferring the funds because it was transferred between political action committees for the same candidates in violation of contribution limits. The PAC involved, the U.S. Family Network, is connected with Abramoff, Bob Ney, and Willie Tan, a businessman in the Northern Mariana Islands, all currently associated with a political scandal.

=== Legislative activity ===
Davis was chair of the Select Committee to Investigate the Preparation for and Response to Hurricane Katrina. Democrats, who had proposed an independent investigation, objected and did not officially take part in the committee. The committee proceeded, eventually producing a stinging report critical of government's response to the disaster.

Davis introduced the bill that became the Elizabeth Morgan Act, passed in 1996. In 2003, a federal appeals court ruled that the act was an unconstitutional bill of attainder.

Davis has been instrumental in getting federal funding for the replacement of the Woodrow Wilson Bridge.

Davis sponsored legislation creating a financial control board for Washington, D.C. He was in charge, until 2000, of the Government Reform Committee's Subcommittee on the District of Columbia, generally favoring allowing the District government more autonomy.

Apparently in a surprise to the House Judiciary Committee, the Reform Committee passed HR 2043 (the DC Fair and Equal House Voting Rights Act), a bill Davis introduced to provide the District of Columbia with voting representation in Congress. This bill differs from other bills that would grant the district the right to elect representatives. HR 2043 requires the addition of two representatives, one in Washington, D.C., and one in Utah, by raising the number of Representatives from 435 to 437. Originally, the number of House seats would return to 435 after the 2010 Census, with Washington, D.C. retaining a full vote in the House., but later versions of the bill make the expansion to 437 seats permanent. The bill did not make it to the House floor, however.

The bill was reintroduced, cosponsored by Davis, as the "District of Columbia House Voting Rights Act of 2007", as H.R. 1433 in the 110th Congress. The bill permanently increases the size of the House by two members. One seat will go to the District of Columbia and the other seat will go to the next state in line to get a congressional seat. Based on the 2000 decennial census and apportionment calculations, Utah will get the second seat until the reapportionment taking place after the 2010 Decennial Census. On March 13, 2007 it passed the House Committee on Oversight and Government Reform with a vote of 24–5.

=== 2004 and 2006 election campaigns ===
Davis's congressional district was redistricted after the 2000 census, which increased the percentage of Republicans in the district. In 2004, he defeated his relatively unknown Democratic challenger, Ken Longmyer, by a 59 percent to 39 percent margin. In the race, Davis outspent Longmyer, $1,835,000 to $72,000.

In the November 2006 election, Davis defeated Democrat Andrew Hurst by 11 percentage points. It was the closest and costliest race Davis faced in 12 years. In financing his campaign, Davis outspent Hurst almost 9-to-1, $2,607,125 to $310,561.

Independent Green Party co-founder, businessman Joseph Oddo was on the ballot in 2004. Ferdinado Greco, a physicist, George Mason University grad, owner and operator of a hybrid taxi business, was the Independent Green candidate in 2006.

== Initial steps toward a 2008 Senate campaign ==
On September 15, 2007, Davis told WTOP's Politics Program that he was running for the Senate seat being vacated by John Warner. He said that he has been assembling money and staff for the contest, but was delaying a formal announcement until November. It had been presumed that he would face former Governor Jim Gilmore for the nomination. However, the state Republican Party opted to choose its nominee at a nominating convention rather than in a primary.

Davis argued that a primary would expose the candidates to the kind of environment they would face in November. It was also thought that a primary would have favored Davis due to his popularity in voter-rich Northern Virginia. In contrast, the delegates at the nominating convention would have been made up mostly of party activists; the state's Republican activist base is much more conservative than the primary and general electorates. Gilmore had argued strongly for a convention, claiming that a primary would leave the winner short of cash; he is also much more conservative than Davis, and would therefore have likely been the favorite at the convention. Funding was no small consideration, as the race for the Democratic nomination essentially ended when former Governor Mark Warner announced his candidacy. Warner was one of the state's most popular politicians, and had the ability to self-finance his campaign due to his considerable personal fortune.

The party opted for a convention, and Davis therefore announced in October 2007 that he would not run for the Senate. Gilmore was nominated, and lost the general election to Warner in a landslide. Davis also did not run for reelection to his House seat, and was replaced by Democrat Gerry Connolly.

Davis told the National Press Club in 2007 that he was considering later mounting a challenge to Virginia's other Senator, Jim Webb, in 2012. Ultimately, he did not enter that race.

== Post-congressional career ==
On November 17, 2008, Davis joined Deloitte Consulting in their Washington, D.C. office. He resigned from Congress on November 24, 2008.

Davis served as president and CEO of the Republican Main Street Partnership, a moderate Republican organization.

He has also started teaching a class at George Mason University, called "Southern Politics" in the 2008 Fall Semester. In the Spring and Fall of 2010, Davis taught Political Parties and Campaigns. The course is described as "Characteristics and functions of political parties, influence of parties and other political forces on electoral decisions, and emphasis on parties' inability or ability to hold government accountable to citizens" in the catalog. Former Virginia U.S. Representative Jim Moran also teaches the class with him.

On December 21, 2010, it was announced that Virginia Governor Bob McDonnell appointed Davis to be a member of the Metropolitan Washington Airports Authority Board of Directors, filling one of the five seats on the Board allotted to Virginia.

In August 2014 Davis was named Rector (Chairman of the Board of Visitors) of George Mason University, as well as being a professor at the school. Davis resigned from the Metropolitan Washington Airports Authority board to take that post. Davis served on the Board of Visitors from 2013 until 2021. In February 2026, he was reappointed to the board.

Davis was a member of the ReFormers Caucus of Issue One, a group of former members of congress, governors and cabinet officials dedicated to campaign finance reform.

In 2019, he left his position at Deloitte and became a lobbyist for the Holland & Knight law firm.

== Political positions ==
Davis's district is in the Virginia suburbs of Washington, D.C. He was active in efforts to change federal procurement and contracting practices that make it faster to award contracts but also easier to award no-bid, "cost-plus" and "share in savings" contracts. These contracts especially involved the GSA and the Department of Homeland Security. Critics of the reforms pointed to the increasing campaign contributions from beneficiaries of the contracts and a reduction in audit and auditors, oversight, and performance by contractors after the changes.

Tom Davis was one of only eleven Republicans to vote against the Contract with America Tax Relief Act that cut taxes by $189 billion over five years, including lowering the capital gains tax rate and easing the "marriage penalty," and supported a tax hike referendum to raise sales taxes in northern Virginia by 4.5 to 5%.

He also went against his party by supporting District of Columbia voting rights, and introduced "The District of Columbia Fair and Equal House Voting Rights Act of 2006" before the house. However, this bill never made it out of committee.

Davis supported Virginia's Right-to-work law, which was opposed by organized labor.

In 2006, Davis said he opposed amnesty for illegal immigrants and supported H.R. 4437, an immigration reform bill sponsored by Rep. James Sensenbrenner.

Davis voted to support stem cell research. He was a member of the Republican Main Street Partnership, a group of Republicans who describe themselves as "mainstream".

In 2007, expressing disapproval with the Democratic Party resolution disapproving of the Iraq troop surge, Davis nevertheless broke with his party line to vote for the resolution.

Project Vote Smart reported that Davis has high approval ratings from business groups, but significantly lower ratings from groups that support abortion rights, environmental protection, and civil liberties.

In 2012, Davis was elected president of the Federal City Council, a group of business, civic, education, and other leaders interested in economic development in Washington, D.C.

== Personal life ==
Davis is a member of the Christian Science Church.

In 1973, Davis married Margaret "Peggy" Rantz, a medical doctor. They have three children together. He divorced her in late 2003 and announced his intention to marry Jeannemarie Devolites in February 2004. They married in June of that year. Davis's first public involvement with Devolites was in 1997 when he managed her campaign for the Virginia House of Delegates, her fourth campaign and first successful one, and was her biggest campaign contributor. In 2003 she was elected to the Virginia State Senate, serving one term before her defeat for re-election in 2007. Davis's political action committees gave her more than $172,000 by mid-2006. He has four stepdaughters from this marriage.

== Electoral history ==
Virginia's 11th congressional district: Results 1994–2006
Year	Democratic	Votes	Pct	Republican	Votes	Pct	3rd Party	Party	Votes	Pct		3rd Party	Party	Votes	Pct	
1994	Leslie L. Byrne	84,104	45%	Tom Davis	98,216	53%	Gordon S. Cruickshank	Independent	3,246	2%	*					
1996	Thomas J. Horton	74,701	35%	Tom Davis	138,758	64%	C. W. "Levi" Levy	Independent	2,842	1%	*					
1998	(no candidate)			Tom Davis	91,603	82%	C. W. "Levi" Levy	Independent	18,807	17%		Write-ins		1,701	2%	
2000	M. L. "Mike" Corrigan	83,455	34%	Tom Davis	150,395	62%	Robert K. McBride	Independent	4,774	2%		C. W. "Levi" Levy	Independent	4,059	2%	*
2002	(no candidate)			Tom Davis	135,379	83%	Frank W. Creel	Constitution	26,892	16%		Write-ins		1,027	1%	
2004	Ken Longmyer	118,305	38%	Tom Davis	186,299	60%	Joseph P. Oddo	Independent	4,338	1%	*					
2006	Andrew L. Hurst	102,511	44%	Tom Davis	130,468	55%	Ferdinando C. Greco	Independent Green	2,042	1%	*					

*Write-in and minor candidate notes: In 1992, write-ins received 145 votes. In 1994, write-ins received 114 votes. In 1996, write-ins received 181 votes. In 2000, write-ins received 285 votes. In 2004, write-ins received 291 votes. In 2006, write-ins received 259 votes.

U.S. House of Representatives
Preceded by Leslie Byrne	Member of the U.S. House of Representatives from Virginia's 11th congressional district 1995–2008	Succeeded by Gerry Connolly
Preceded by Dan Burton	Chair of the House Oversight Committee; 2003–2007	Succeeded by Henry Waxman
Preceded by Henry Waxman	Ranking Member of the House Oversight Committee; 2007–2008	Succeeded by Darrell Issa
Party political offices
Preceded by John Linder	Chair of the National Republican Congressional Committee; 1999–2003	Succeeded by Tom Reynolds
U.S. order of precedence (ceremonial)
Preceded by Annie Kuster as Former U.S. Representative	Order of precedence of the United States as Former U.S. Representative	Succeeded by Virgil Goode as Former U.S. Representative
