= Republican Majority Issues Committee =

The Republican Majority Issues Committee (RMIC), a tax-exempt 527 committee, organized as a corporation under the laws of Virginia with its principal office located in Virginia, was created by and through the fundraising efforts of Ed Buckham, the founder of Alexander Strategy Group. Karl Gallant ran RMIC and served as its registered agent.
