= John Doolittle =

American politician (born 1950)

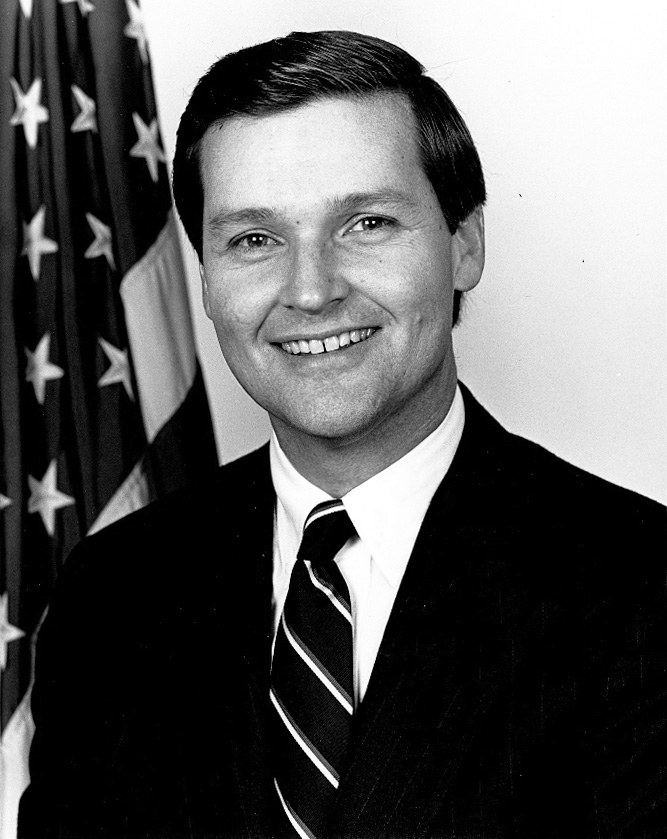

Secretary of the House Republican Conference
- In office January 3, 2003 – January 3, 2007
- Leader: Dennis Hastert
- Preceded by: Barbara Cubin
- Succeeded by: John Carter

Member of the U.S. House of Representatives from California
- In office January 3, 1991 – January 3, 2009
- Preceded by: Norman D. Shumway
- Succeeded by: Tom McClintock
- Constituency: 14th district (1991–1993); 4th district (1993–2009)

Member of the California State Senate
- In office December 1, 1980 – January 2, 1991
- Preceded by: Albert S. Rodda
- Succeeded by: Tim Leslie
- Constituency: 3rd district (1980–1984); 1st district (1984–1991)

Personal details
- Born: John Taylor Doolittle; October 30, 1950 (age 75) Glendale, California, U.S.
- Party: Republican
- Spouse: Julie Harlow
- Education: University of California, Santa Cruz (BA); University of the Pacific (JD)

John Taylor Doolittle (born October 30, 1950) is an American politician and attorney. Elected to Congress in 1990, he served as a Republican member of the United States House of Representatives from 1991 to 2009, representing California's 4th congressional district (numbered as California's 14th congressional district during his first term). In the 109th Congress, he held a leadership role as the Deputy Whip for the Republican party in the House. He was succeeded in the House of Representatives by Tom McClintock. Before being elected to Congress, he had served in the California State Senate from 1984 to 1991.

In the approach to the 2008 election, Doolittle lost support from previous allies and had difficulty in fundraising. He announced that he would not run again. He had been criticized by opponents for improprieties, including using his wife's one-person firm for his political fundraising, as she based her compensation on a percentage of all funds raised, including from his PAC. She made nearly $180,000 in such commissions from 2001 to 2006. His office did not stop using her firm for fundraising until January 2007.

He was under investigation from 2006 to 2010 related to alleged financial improprieties. These included his and his wife's business relations with Jack Abramoff, a prominent Washington, D.C. lobbyist who was found to have defrauded numerous clients, including Indian tribes. During this period, Citizens for Responsibility and Ethics in Washington (CREW) listed Doolittle as among the 20 most corrupt congressmen in reports from 2006 to 2009. The US Attorney closed its investigation of Doolittle in 2010 without bringing any charges against him.

== Early life and education ==
Doolittle was born in Glendale, California, on October 30, 1950. He grew up in Cupertino, California, attending local public schools. He graduated from Cupertino High School in 1968. He graduated with honors with a B.A. in history from the University of California, Santa Cruz. He earned a Juris Doctor degree from McGeorge School of Law, University of the Pacific, in Sacramento, in 1978.

Before going to law school, Doolittle spent two years as a missionary in Argentina for the Church of Jesus Christ of Latter-day Saints, to which he and his family belonged. Doolittle is married to the former Julia (Julie) Harlow. They have a son and daughter.

== Career prior to the U.S. House ==
Doolittle entered politics early. Soon after passing the bar, in 1979 Doolittle started work as an aide to California state senator H. L. Richardson, the conservative founder of Gun Owners of America and the Law and Order Campaign Committee.

The next year Doolittle decided to run for the state senate, with encouragement from Richardson and other Republicans. Riding on the coattails of Governor Ronald Reagan's victory in the presidential race, in 1980 the 29-year-old Doolittle narrowly defeated incumbent Democrat Albert S. Rodda, dean of the state Senate and chair of the Senate Finance Committee. Doolittle won his seat in the California State Senate.

In 1981, the Democratic-dominated state legislature issued a redistricting plan following the 1980 census and congressional reapportionment. It tried to squeeze out Republican lawmakers. The newly drawn district put Doolittle into a predominately Democratic district, where he lost to then-Assemblyman Leroy Greene in 1982 for the state senate. But by a quirk of redistricting rules, Doolittle was able to keep his original seat until 1984. He won another term in the state senate by beating Ray E. Johnson, a Republican turned Independent from Chico. An administrative law judge later found Doolittle guilty of violating campaign finance laws because his campaign had contributed to his Democratic opponent in order to pull votes away from Johnson.

Doolittle easily won re-election in 1988. From 1987 to 1990, he was chairman of the state Senate Republican Caucus.

=== Initial election and re-elections ===
In 1990, Republican Norman D. Shumway, also a Mormon, retired from Congress. In the November general election, Doolittle defeated Patty Malberg, a Democrat from Lincoln, getting 51% of the vote, in what was then California's 14th congressional district. The district covered much of the northeastern corner of the state, from the northern suburbs of Sacramento to the Oregon border.

Doolittle's district was renumbered as California's 4th congressional district in 1992, following redistricting. He was reelected with 50 percent of the vote, again defeating Malberg. In 1994 he received 60% of the vote and did not face another close race until 2006.

=== Political positions and actions ===
In his first years in Congress, Doolittle was a member of the group known as the Gang of Seven, which had a role in exposing the House banking scandal.

Doolittle is a staunch conservative. According to the Associated Press, "Doolittle is a generally loyal supporter of the Bush administration—though like many House Republicans he opposes Bush's support for an immigration guest worker program." He is in favor of partial privatization of Social Security, saying he would like to see people "gain ownership over their own funds". He opposes gun control and abortion rights.

After the Republican Study Committee had its funding removed in 1995, Doolittle helped revive it as the "Conservative Action Team." He alternated the chairmanship with Dan Burton of Indiana, Sam Johnson of Texas, and Ernest Istook of Oklahoma until 1999.

In November 1997, Doolittle was one of eighteen Republicans in the House to co-sponsor a resolution by Bob Barr that sought to launch an impeachment inquiry against President Bill Clinton. The resolution did not specify any charges or allegations. This was an early effort to impeach Clinton, predating the eruption of the Clinton–Lewinsky scandal. The eruption of that scandal would ultimately lead to a more serious effort to impeach Clinton in 1998. On October 8, 1998, Doolitte voted in favor of legislation that was passed to open an impeachment inquiry. On December 19, 1998, Doolittle voted in favor of all four proposed articles of impeachment against Clinton (only two of which received the needed majority of votes to be adopted).

In January 2006, an opinion piece published in The Union newspaper, of Grass Valley, California, quoted Doolittle as saying that "A liberal front is underway to find God and all things pertaining to him unconstitutional."

In February 2006, Doolittle was praised by the El Dorado Irrigation District for his assistance in obtaining federal funds for hydroelectric power projects.

=== Auburn Dam Project ===
Doolittle is known for support of the Auburn Dam project, despite environmental concerns. People who opposed construction of the dam were particularly concerned about the uncertainties of the potential effects of such a dam on seismic activity in the area. A mid-1990s preliminary United States Geological Survey report cited concerns about the potential for earthquakes to be caused by that project.

Doolittle's stated reason for supporting the Auburn Dam was for flood control of Sacramento. After Hurricane Katrina in 2005, he portrayed the flooding in New Orleans as an example of why the project was needed. Critics replied that the Gulf Coast, with its hurricane season and the torrential rainfalls associated with it, is not a valid comparison to a region of the country that historically often has droughts. They said that Folsom and Nimbus dams sufficed to control floods in an intense rainy season. Opponents of the project believe that the proposed Auburn Dam will also accelerate urban sprawl east of Sacramento and downriver from the proposed dam. Placer County already has one of the highest growth rates in the country, putting strains on local services and infrastructure, and affecting the environment. Opponents also cited other issues, such as destruction of the canyon environment and loss of habitat for wildlife.

In 1975, the construction of the dam was stopped due to environmental concerns, money issues, and the seismic instability of the proposed dam site. The construction was canceled and the project is abandoned. Much of the preliminary work on the dam can still be seen today. In 2005, Doolittle secured funding for studies to move the project forward.

=== 21st century re-election campaigns ===
==== 2002 ====
In 2002, Doolittle defeated Republican challenger Dr. Bill Kirby of Auburn, California, 78%–22%. In the general election, Doolittle defeated Mark Norberg, 65%-35%, while raising $1,024,986 compared to Norberg's $8,202.

==== 2004 ====
In 2004, Doolittle took in more than $1 million in contributions and received 65% of the vote. His Democratic opponent David Winters raised $2,300; he won 35 percent of the vote.

==== 2006 ====
In the Republican primary on June 6, 2006, Doolittle was challenged for his party's nomination by Mike Holmes, the mayor of Auburn. Doolittle raised more than $1.1 million in campaign contributions, more than 14 times the fund of Holmes. Doolittle won the primary with 67% of the vote.

In the general election, Doolittle's Democratic opponent was retired Air Force Lt. Colonel Charles Brown. Doolittle agreed to a single debate, on October 11, 2006. Doolittle defeated Brown, getting 49% of the vote to Brown's 46%. Brown defeated Doolittle in Nevada County, but narrowly lost Placer County, the most populated county in the district, and lost the rest of the district.

In January 2007, Doolittle announced ten steps he said he would take to re-establish the confidence of the district in his holding office. He announced the planned changes in an op-ed piece he distributed to newspapers in his district, to attempt to gain free publicity about it.

== Legislative record ==
=== State Children's Health Insurance Program (SCHIP) ===
In 2007, Congress took up the reauthorization of the State Children's Health Insurance Program, which provides health care for about 6 million children and 670,000 adults from families who earn too much money to qualify for Medicare but not enough to afford health insurance. Congressional Democrats and many Republicans tried to expand the coverage of the program to other needy families, but they were opposed by President George W. Bush and other Republicans. In 2006, 5.4 million children were eligible but not enrolled in SCHIP or Medicaid, and 9.4 million total children were uninsured. Such children and their families are often treated in emergency rooms of hospitals, a much more expensive alternative for taxpayers than expanding the SCHIP and similar programs.

John Doolittle voted against the first House bill, which passed along party lines. It would have added $47 billion over five years to the $25 billion cost of the program and added about 5 million people to the program, including children, some legal immigrants, pregnant women, and adults aged 18 and 19. The bill was to be financed mainly by an increase in cigarette taxes.

House Democrats, with 45 Republicans, later compromised and passed a bill that expanded the plan by $35 billion and would have insured about 3.5 million more children from families generally making between 250% and 300% of the federal poverty line (about $51,000 to $62,000 for a family of four). Most non-pregnant, childless adults were excluded, as were most legal immigrants and all illegal immigrants. Doolittle voted against the bill.

After President Bush vetoed the bill, Democratic leaders attempted to override the veto with the same bill but failed. Doolittle voted against the bill.

House Democrats attempted to override the veto with a new bill, which acceded to Republican demands for increased checks for citizenship, the quick phasing-out of adult coverage, a hard limit of 300% of the federal poverty level, and funding for families to cover their children through private insurance instead. Angry that the congressional vote was scheduled to proceed despite massive wildfires in California, Republicans blocked the veto override. Doolittle voted with fellow Republicans against the bill.

== Campaign finances ==
Between 2005 and 2006, John Doolittle raised a total of $2,354,786 for his political campaign. 65.1% of his finances came from private donors, 34.5% from PACs, and 0.3% from other various sources. 54.3% of the PAC contributions came from business organizations while the other 45.7% came from labor and ideological groups. At the end of his 2005–2006 political campaign, 98.4% of his finances were completely disclosed. According to the FEC (Federal Election Commission), John Doolittle raised a total of $278,142 in that year.

== Controversies ==
Doolittle was investigated by the US Attorney for issues related to his campaign financing and reporting, beginning in 2006. He and his wife both had business and political relations with Jack Abramoff, a prominent lobbyist in Washington, DC. Abramoff was investigated by a Congressional committee and found to have defrauded numerous clients, especially Indian tribes which he represented on gaming issues. Doolittle's wife had a consulting firm that Abramoff used for some activities. He required his Indian tribe clients to contribute some $50,000 to Doolittle's political campaigns and personally contributed another $14,000.

On September 20, 2006, the Citizens for Responsibility and Ethics in Washington (CREW), a non-profit group headed by former Democratic Congressional staffer Melanie Sloan, released its second annual report on the most corrupt members of Congress. It was entitled Beyond DeLay: The 20 Most Corrupt Members of Congress (and Five to Watch). Doolittle was one of the 20 discussed in the report. The organization said, "His ethics issues stem from his wife's relationship to his campaign and political action committees, as well as campaign contributions and personal financial benefits he accepted from those who sought his legislative assistance." He was also listed as among the most corrupt Congressmen in CREW's subsequent 2007 and 2008 reports.

On June 11, 2010, the U.S. Attorney announced that, after a 4-year investigation, they had closed its case against Congressman Doolittle and would not pursue charges. Doolittle, who had consistently denied wrongdoing, expressed regret that so many lives and careers had been affected by the investigation. He was forced from office by it. He said he was relieved that the investigation was ended.

=== Abramoff connections ===
Doolittle was entangled in the scandal involving Jack Abramoff. On September 27, 2007, he indicated that he planned to fight a Justice Department subpoena for 11 years of records as part of that department's investigation into his conduct.

Doolittle has denied any wrongdoing. In connection with the matter, he hired David Barger, a criminal defense lawyer and former prosecutor from Ken Starr's office, and Wiley Rein LLP, a law firm that specializes in campaign finance and government ethics. Doolittle has estimated that he received about $50,000 in contributions for his campaigns from clients of Abramoff, mostly Indian tribes. His congressional campaigns from 1999 to 2004 received $14,000 in personal donations from Abramoff over the period 1999–2004 to Doolittle's congressional campaigns. After Doolittle's Chief of Staff Kevin A. Ring left to work for Abramoff, Ring helped arrange for Abramoff to hire a consulting firm owned by Doolittle's wife. Doolittle used Abramoff's luxury sports box for a political fundraiser and failed to report this as part of his campaign finances. Doolittle was investigated by a federal probe into his relationship with Abramoff. On April 13, 2007, Doolittle's former aide, Kevin Ring, resigned from his lobby firm. On the same day, the FBI raided Doolittle's Virginia home. On September 4, 2007, the House announced that Doolittle's Chief of Staff Ron Rogers and Deputy Chief of Staff Dan Blankenburg were subpoenaed to testify before a grand jury.

=== Small towns pressured to hire lobbyists ===
Dan Landon, a Republican and the executive director of the Nevada County Transportation Commission, said that he was told recently by Doolittle's staff that "it also doesn't hurt to have a lobbyist". Sharon Atteberry, city administrator for the city of Oroville, said she had also been urged to hire a lobbyist by Doolittle's staff. "They encouraged us that a lobbyist is very important to any city or county government" she said.

=== Activities of Julie Doolittle ===
During the 2001–2005 period, Julie Doolittle had at least three different occupations: she worked for Jack Abramoff doing event planning (see above); she worked as a bookkeeper for a lobbying firm; and she worked on commission as a fundraiser for her husband. Payments to Julie Doolittle during the period were done via a company called Sierra Dominion Financial Solutions. It was founded in March 2001, just after Congressman Doolittle gained a seat on the Appropriations Committee. It is based at the couple's home in Oakton, Virginia; Julie is the only employee. The company (that is, Julie) has continued to do fundraising, but no event planning or other work, since the Abramoff scandal first became public in early 2005.

==== Work for lobbying firm ====
From 2002 until mid-2005, the Alexander Strategy Group, a Washington, D.C. lobbying firm with close ties to Congressman Tom DeLay, paid Sierra Dominion for bookkeeping work for a nonprofit group called the Korea-U.S. Exchange Council (KORUSEC), created by Ed Buckham, a partner in the firm, and was located at the ASG headquarters. KORUSEC is also connected to Kevin Ring, one of Doolittle's former assistants. ASG closed due to the financial scandals caused by Jack Abramoff and his associates. Julie Doolittle's records regarding her work there were subpoenaed by the US Department of Justice.

==== Fundraising commissions from Doolittle campaign revenues ====
Sierra Dominion charged Doolittle's campaign and his Superior California Political Action Committee a 15 percent commission on any contribution that Julie Doolittle helped bring in. Federal and state campaign records show that, since late 2001, she had received nearly $180,000 in commissions from for such fundraising. This meant that Doolittle and his family had personally made money off his political fundraising. Doolittle aides said even though the PAC had made payments to other fundraisers, Julie Doolittle was entitled to 15 percent of all money the PAC brought in because those donations were raised at events she helped organize.

In December 2005, Richard Robinson, Doolittle's Chief of Staff, defended the commission structure. "Sierra Dominion's compensation is based entirely on performance in that it receives a percentage in what it is directly involved in raising. This arrangement is not only consistent with that of other fund raisers but is designed to avoid the appearance that Sierra Dominion is compensated for anything other than its tireless and effective work. Any suggestion otherwise is completely without merit."

But in 2006, the 27,000-member Association of Fundraising Professionals published a letter it had sent to Doolittle, stating emphatically that his wife's activities and form of compensation violated the Association's ethics code. Their code "explicitly prohibits percentage-based compensation".

In January 2007, Doolittle announced that he would no longer employ his wife as his campaign fundraiser. Instead, he said, he would hire an outside fundraiser. But in July 2007, his campaign reported expenses of $50,000 for fundraising by Sierra Dominion Financial Solutions during the April–June 2007 period. The company was also still owed $76,000 in commissions from the 2006 race.

=== 2005 trip to Asia ===
KORUSEC, which employed Doolittle's wife (see above) and the U.S.-Malaysia Exchange Association, another non-profit firm operated by ASG, paid the total $29,400 cost of what was described as a "fact finding mission" in 2005 for Congressman Doolittle and his 12-year-old daughter to South Korea and Malaysia. This trip included a stop at the Berjaya Beach & Spa Resort on the Malaysian island of Langkawi.

KORUSEC and the U.S.-Malaysia Exchange Association, which were operated by the Washington lobbying firm, Alexander Strategy Group, were, as of November 2006, being investigated by the FBI as possible conduits for illegal influence in U.S. affairs; foreign corporations such as KORUSEC and foreign governments, such as USMEA, are prohibited from seeking such influence. A spokeswoman for Doolittle said that he believed that his trip was proper and that it had nothing to do with the earmarks he had approved in the federal budget.

=== Connections to Brent Wilkes ===
PerfectWave is a company owned by Brent R. Wilkes; Doolittle has had significant involvement with both the company and its owner. Disgraced Congressman Duke Cunningham admitted receiving hundreds of thousands of dollars in cash and favors from Wilkes for his efforts to help another of Wilkes' companies, ADCS Inc.

In 2002, Wilkes hired the Alexander Strategy Group (ASG) for lobbying for his company. In November 2003, Wilkes hosted a fund-raising dinner for Congressman Doolittle. Between 2002 and 2005, Doolittle received at least $118,000 in campaign contributions from Wilkes, PerfectWave associates and their wives, and ASG lobbyists Edwin A. Buckham and Tony C. Rudy (two former aides of Tom DeLay) and their wives.

Doolittle, a member of the House Appropriations Committee, said in January 2006 that he had helped steer defense funds totaling $37 million to PerfectWave ($1 million in 2002, $18 million in 2003, and then $18 million in 2004.) Doolittle said that his support was based "on the project's merits and the written support of the military."

But the San Diego Union-Tribune reported that "The money was not requested by the Navy but was instead inserted by the Appropriations Committee as part of the closed-door congressional earmarking process." They further reported that "[T]he only evidence Doolittle's office could provide to show military support for the project was a letter of praise from Robert Lusardi, a program manager for light armored vehicles at the Marine Corps dated Feb. 25—two and a half years after PerfectWave got its first earmark. By the time Lusardi wrote his letter, the company had received at least $37 million in earmarks."

In February 2006, Doolittle said that he was glad he supported PerfectWave, saying "it has unique technology ... that ensures the safety of our armed forces in the war on terror."

=== Investigation of Charles Hurwitz ===
On January 8, 2006, the Los Angeles Times reported that "Reps. John T. Doolittle and Richard W. Pombo joined forces with former House Majority Leader Tom DeLay of Texas to oppose an investigation by federal banking regulators into the affairs of Houston millionaire Charles Hurwitz, documents recently obtained by The Times show." "When the FDIC persisted [in seeking investigation], Doolittle and Pombo—both considered proteges of DeLay—used their power as members of the House Resources Committee to subpoena the agency's confidential records on the case, including details of the evidence FDIC investigators had compiled on Hurwitz." The FDIC investigation was ultimately dropped.

The Times reported that "Although Washington politicians frequently try to help important constituents and contributors, it is unusual for members of Congress to take direct steps to stymie an ongoing investigation by an agency such as the FDIC." The article concluded, "in the Hurwitz case, Doolittle and Pombo were in a position to pressure the FDIC and did so."

On April 19, 2007, Doolittle resigned from the Committee on Appropriations in response to a raid by the FBI at his Northern Virginia home. The raid stemmed from possible involvement by his wife in the investigation of Jack Abramoff for defrauding clients as a lobbyist and inappropriate influence.

== 2008 re-election campaign ==
Democrat Charlie Brown, a retired Lt. Colonel who had narrowly lost to Doolittle in 2006 by 3 percent of the vote, announced in February 2007 that he would run again in 2008. In the first and second quarters of 2007, Brown raised more campaign funds than Doolittle; as of June 30, he had a net cash balance of $251,000; Doolittle had a negative balance of $32,000. Analysts believed that the continuing corruption investigation caused the decline in support for Doolittle.

In August 2007, former Placer County Republican Party chairman Ken Campbell, a longtime financial backer of Doolittle, said he was withdrawing his support. Campbell cited a recent Club for Growth report on votes in 2007 on spending bills, where Doolittle scored 2 percent, compared to the Republican average of 43 percent.

In July 2007, Eric Egland, a 37-year-old Air Force reservist and security consultant, announced that he would seek the Republican nomination for the seat held by Doolittle. In August 2007, Auburn City Councilman Mike Holmes announced that he also was entering the 2008 race. Holmes ran unsuccessfully against Doolittle in the primary for the Republican nomination in 2006, getting 33 percent of the primary vote to 67 percent for Doolittle.

On August 30, 2007, State Assemblyman Ted Gaines announced the establishment of an exploratory committee to begin raising money to run for Congress against Doolittle, stating "I think voters have lost faith in his leadership ability ... when you lose the moral ability to lead, you kind of have to re-evaluate."

Doolittle said, "After spending the last month talking to local voters, I have seen strong support for my candidacy and a strong desire to focus on solving problems instead of plotting for political advantage ... I will gladly place before the voters my record of over 30 years of service to the Republican Party to Ted Gaines' less than one year."

After much speculation, on January 10, 2008, John Doolittle announced he would finish his current term, but would not run for re-election.

After Doolittle's retirement announcement, Councilman Holmes quit the race and instead endorsed former Republican Congressman Doug Ose, who announced on February 1, 2008, that he is running for Doolittle's seat. Ose faced opposition from former California State Senator Rico Oller (R-San Andreas), who announced his candidacy on January 10, 2008. When California State Senator Tom McClintock (R-Thousand Oaks) announced that he too was running for Doolittle's seat on March 4, 2008, Oller dropped out of the race, and decided to give his endorsement to McClintock. Although he didn't live in the district, McClintock beat Charlie Brown in the general election by only 1,800 votes.

== Electoral history ==
John Doolittle electoral history

1990 United States House of Representatives elections in California
Party	Candidate	Votes	%
Republican	John Doolittle	128,309	51.5
Democratic	Patricia Malberg	120,742	48.5
Total votes		249,051	100.0
Turnout			
Republican hold			

1992 United States House of Representatives elections
Party	Candidate	Votes	%
Republican	John Doolittle (Incumbent)	141,155	49.8
Democratic	Patricia Malberg	129,489	45.7
Libertarian	Patrick Lee McHargue	12,705	4.5
No party	Brooksher (write-in)	16	0.0
Total votes		283,265	100.0
Turnout			
Republican hold			

1994 United States House of Representatives elections
Party	Candidate	Votes	%
Republican	John Doolittle (Incumbent)	144,936	61.33
Democratic	Katie Hirning	82,505	34.91
Libertarian	Damon C. Falconi	8,882	3.76
Total votes		236,323	100.0
Turnout			
Republican hold			

1996 United States House of Representatives elections
Party	Candidate	Votes	%
Republican	John Doolittle (Incumbent)	164,048	60.5
Democratic	Katie Hirning	97,948	36.1
Libertarian	Patrick McHargue	9,319	3.4
Total votes		271,315	100.0
Turnout			
Republican hold			

1998 United States House of Representatives elections
Party	Candidate	Votes	%
Republican	John Doolittle (Incumbent)	155,306	62.57
Democratic	David Shapiro	85,394	34.40
Libertarian	Dan Winterrowd	7,524	3.03
Total votes		248,224	100.0
Turnout			
Republican hold			

2000 United States House of Representatives elections
Party	Candidate	Votes	%
Republican	John Doolittle (Incumbent)	197,503	63.5
Democratic	Mark A. Norberg	97,974	31.5
Libertarian	William Fritz Frey	9,494	3.0
Natural Law	Robert E. Ray	6,452	2.0
Total votes		311,423	100.0
Turnout			
Republican hold			

2002 United States House of Representatives elections
Party	Candidate	Votes	%
Republican	John Doolittle (Incumbent)	139,280	64.9
Democratic	Mark A. Norberg	68,755	32.0
Libertarian	Allen M. Roberts	6,834	3.1
Total votes		214,869	100.0
Turnout			
Republican hold			

2004 United States House of Representatives elections
Party	Candidate	Votes	%
Republican	John Doolittle (Incumbent)	221,926	65.4
Democratic	David I. Winters	117,443	34.6
Total votes		339,369	100.0
Turnout			
Republican hold			

2006 United States House of Representatives elections
Party	Candidate	Votes	%
Republican	John Doolittle (Incumbent)	135,818	49.1
Democratic	Charlie Brown	126,999	45.9
Libertarian	Dan Warren	14,076	5.0
Total votes		213,984	100.0
Turnout			
Republican hold			

== See also ==
- List of federal political scandals in the United States

U.S. House of Representatives
Preceded by Norman D. Shumway	Member of the U.S. House of Representatives from California's 14th congressional district 1991–1993	Succeeded by Anna Eshoo
Preceded by Vic Fazio	Member of the U.S. House of Representatives from California's 4th congressional district 1993–2009	Succeeded by Tom McClintock
Party political offices
Preceded by Dan Burton	Chair of the Republican Study Committee; 1995–1999; Served alongside: Dan Burton, Ernest Istook, Sam Johnson	Succeeded by David McIntosh
Preceded by Barbara Cubin	Secretary of the House Republican Conference; 2003–2007	Succeeded by John Carter
U.S. order of precedence (ceremonial)
Preceded by Ron Packard as Former U.S. Representative	Order of precedence of the United States as Former U.S. Representative	Succeeded by Lois Capps as Former U.S. Representative
