= Brozman =

Brozman is a surname. Notable people with the surname include:

- Bob Brozman (1954–2013), American guitarist and ethnomusicologist
- Tina Brozman (1952–2007), American lawyer and judge
