= Swidler Berlin Shereff Friedman =

Swidler Berlin Shereff Friedman LLP was a Washington, D.C.–based law firm, itself a product of the merger between D.C. law firm Swidler & Berlin and New York City's Shereff, Friedman, Hoffman & Goodman LLP in 1998. The firm merged with Bingham McCutchen in 2006. At its height in 2005, Swidler Berlin employed some 300 attorneys with offices on D.C. K Street lobbying corridor and in New York City's iconic Chrysler Building.

Swidler Berlin Shereff Friedman was known for its regulatory, telecommunications, insurance coverage and lobbying capabilities, the latter of which was enhanced by its association with the Harbour Group, a lobbying and public relations firm with strong ties to the Clinton Administration.

The firm engaged in lengthy but ultimately inconclusive merger talks with California-based law firm Orrick, Herrington & Sutcliffe in 2004. The next year, Philadelphia-based Dechert made a mass raid on Swidler Berlin's DC and New York offices, hiring 57 attorneys from both the firm's corporate and litigation departments. This included many legacy Shereff Friedman attorneys and was widely seen as a blow to the firm's long-term prospects. The firm merged with bicoastal firm Bingham McCutchen the next year and the Swidler Berlin name was retired from use. Now-defunct San Francisco firm Heller Ehrman inherited much of the insurance team at that time because of conflict of interest issues. The association with the Harbour Group was discontinued although Bingham McCutchen continues to have a strong political, election law and lobbying practice.

== Notable Mandates ==
- Represented Suiza Foods Corporation, a conglomerate of dairies and dairy operating companies in its $1.5 billion merger with Dean Foods to create the "new" Dean Foods Company in 2001.

== See also ==
- Swidler & Berlin v. United States
