= Virginia's 38th House of Delegates district =

Virginia legislative district

Virginia's 38th State House of Delegates district
- District map from the 2023 election
Delegate
Sam Rasoul; D
- Demographics: 51% White; 31% Black; 10% Hispanic; 3% Asian; 0% Native American; 0% Hawaiian/Pacific Islander; 1% Other; 4% Multiracial
- Population (2024) • Voting age: 86,897; 18
- Registered voters: 57,518

Virginia's 38th House of Delegates district elects one of 100 seats in the Virginia House of Delegates, the lower house of the state's bicameral legislature. As of 2025, District 38 represents most of the city of Roanoke, Virginia. The district is currently represented by Democrat Sam Rasoul.

Virginia state house districts were redrawn and renumbered following the 2021 election. For 2021 and before, District 38 comprised part of Fairfax County and was last represented by Democrat Kaye Kory before redistricting.

== Electoral history ==
In the 1982, a general election was held for all Virginia House of Delegates seats following redistricting (typically Virginia's state-level legislative elections are held on odd-number years). That year, Democrat Nora Anderson Squyres narrowly defeated Republican Gwendalyn F. Cody in the contest to represent the 38th district, winning by just 180 votes; however, another general election was held the following year and Cody defeated Squyres. Cody then served a two-year term before being defeated by Democrat Leslie Byrne in 1985. Byrne represented the seat for the next six years until her election to the U.S. House of Representatives in 1992, becoming the first woman ever elected to represent a Virginia district in the House of Representatives.

In December 1992, Democrat Robert D. Hull won the special election to fill the vacated seat. He was reelected seven times consecutively, serving until he faced a primary challenge from Democrat Kaye Kory, who previously served on the Fairfax County School Board. Kory won the primary by a narrow margin and was elected to the seat in 2009, winning the general with just under 60% of the vote. Since then, Kory has been re-elected four times (2011, 2013, 2015 and 2017), generally earning about 75% of the vote.

In 2019, Kory faced her first primary challenge, from Andres Jimenez.

== District officeholders ==
Years	Delegate	Party	Electoral history
January 1983 – January 1984	Nora Anderson Squyres	Democratic	First elected in November 1982
January 1984 – January 1986	Gwendalyn F. Cody	Republican	First elected in 1983
January 8, 1986 – 1992	Leslie Byrne	Democratic	Vacated seat following election to the US House of Representatives
January 4, 1993 – January 3, 2010	Robert D. Hull	Democratic	Elected in December 1992 special following Byrne's election to US House of Representatives. Defeated in June 2009 Democratic primary by Kaye Kory 49.34% to 50.66%
January 13, 2010 – January 10, 2024	Kaye Kory	Democratic	First elected in 2009
January 10, 2024 – Present	Sam Rasoul	Democratic	Redistricted from the 11th District
