= Leslie Byrne =

American politician (born 1946)

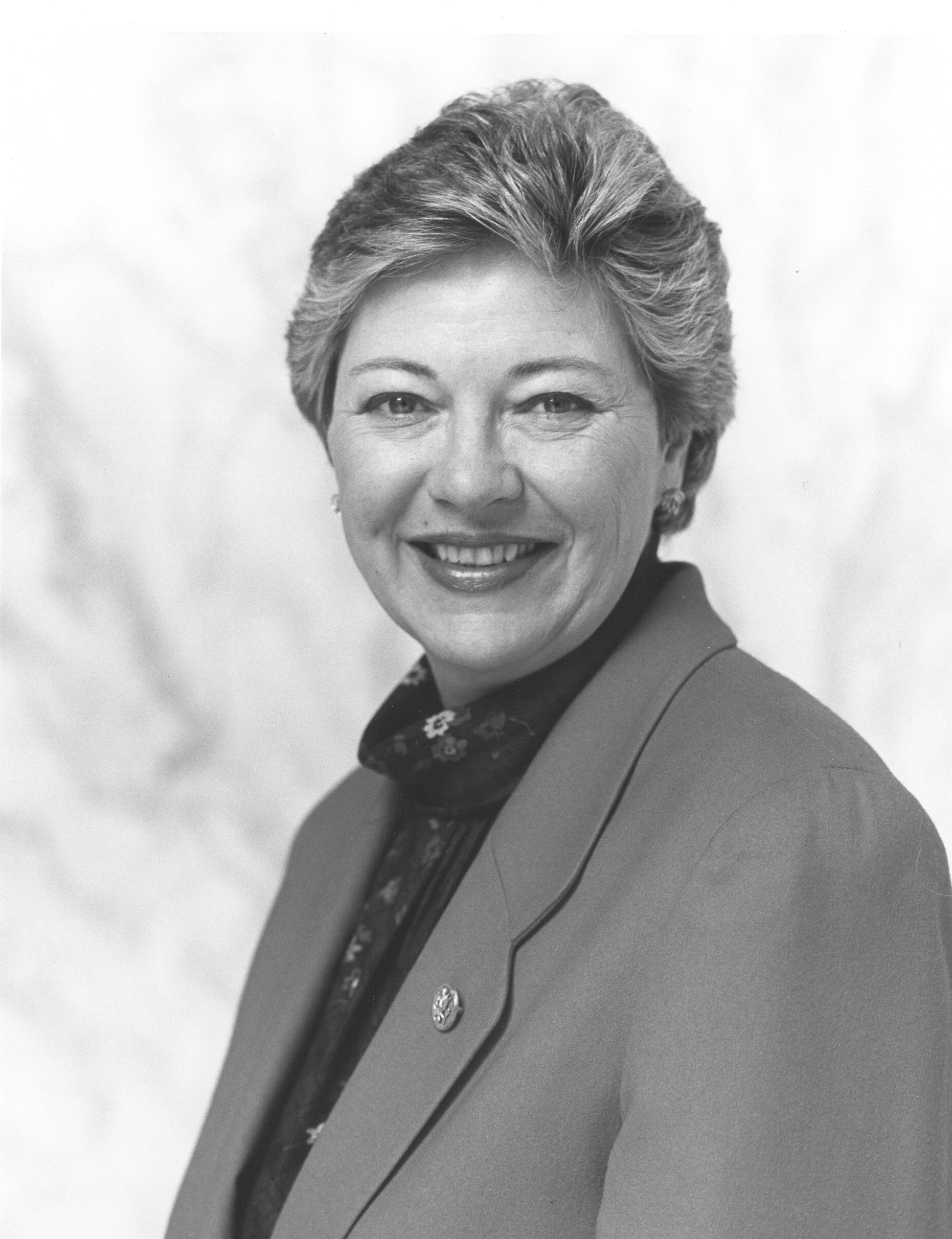

Member of the Virginia Senate from the 34th district
- In office January 12, 2000 – January 14, 2004
- Preceded by: Jane Woods
- Succeeded by: Jeannemarie Devolites Davis

Member of the U.S. House of Representatives from Virginia's 11th district
- In office January 3, 1993 – January 3, 1995
- Preceded by: Constituency reestablished
- Succeeded by: Tom Davis

Member of the Virginia House of Delegates from the 38th district
- In office January 8, 1986 – January 3, 1993
- Preceded by: Gwendalyn F. Cody
- Succeeded by: Robert D. Hull

Personal details
- Born: Leslie Larkin Beck; October 27, 1946 (age 79) Salt Lake City, Utah, U.S.
- Party: Democratic
- Spouse: Larry Byrne
- Education: University of Utah; Mount Vernon College

Leslie Larkin Byrne (née Beck; born October 27, 1946) is an American politician and businesswoman who served as the U.S. representative for Virginia's 11th congressional district from 1993 to 1995. In 1992, she became the first woman elected to the United States House of Representatives from the Commonwealth of Virginia. A member of the Democratic Party, she served for one term but was quickly defeated for re-election in 1994 by Republican Tom Davis.

== Early life and career ==
Byrne was born in Salt Lake City, Utah, the daughter of Stephen and Shirley Beck. Byrne grew up in Salt Lake City and attended both the University of Utah and Mount Vernon College in Ohio. After her family moved to Northern Virginia in 1971, she became active with several community organizations, including the Parent Teacher Association for her children's schools, the Fairfax Area League of Women Voters and the Fairfax County Commission on Fair Campaign Practices.

In 1985, Byrne co-founded Quintech Associates, Inc., a human resources consulting firm. She served as president of Quintech until her election to Congress in 1992.

== Virginia House ==
Byrne served in the Virginia House of Delegates for six years, having defeated two-term Republican incumbent Gwen Cody in 1985. In this role, she supported public/private partnerships for transportation, including the Dulles Greenway project.

== Tenure in Congress ==
In 1992, Virginia was awarded an additional House seat as a result of the 1990 U.S. census. Byrne ran for Congress that year in the newly created 11th congressional district. When she won that race, she became the first woman elected to Congress from Virginia. The election year 1992 was known as the "Year of the Woman" for the large number of women elected to Congress in that election.

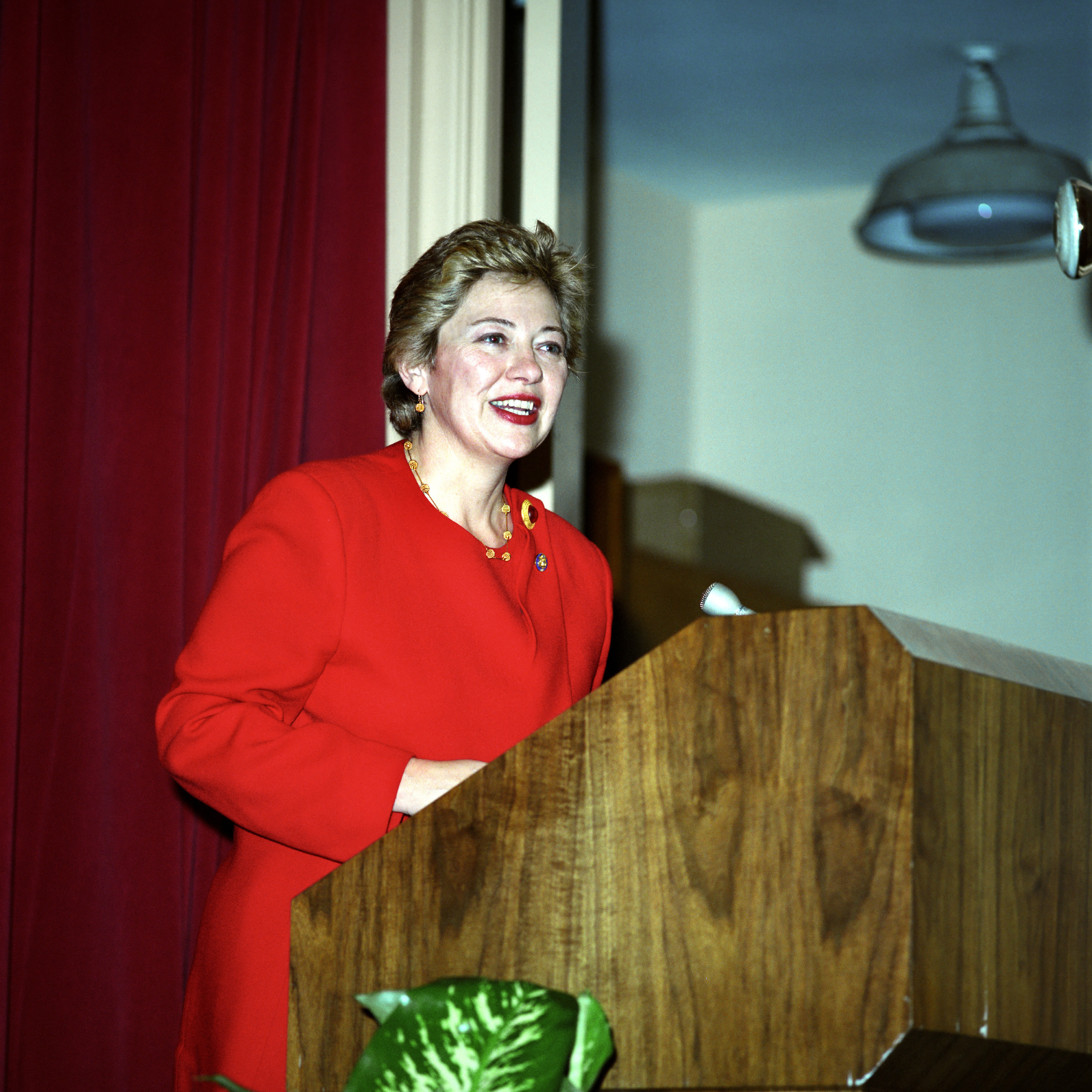
Representative Leslie Byrne gives her keynote address at the Pentagon, March 31, 1993, during the Women's History Month observance.

While a member of the 103rd Congress, Byrne served on the Public Works and Transportation Committee. She was also a member of the Post Office and Civil Service Committee.

The freshman Democratic members of the 103rd Congress elected her to the leadership position of freshman caucus whip. She introduced and passed more legislation than any other freshman representative, including two of her measures on childhood immunization that were passed into law. She helped obtain funds for rail from Tysons Corner to Dulles Airport.

Thomas M. Davis, then chairman of the Fairfax County Board of Supervisors, defeated her for re-election in 1994's "Republican Revolution." His campaign charged that Byrne was too liberal for the swing district she represented and that her voting record was too supportive of President Bill Clinton.

== Political career after Congress ==
In 1996, Byrne sought the Democratic nomination for the U.S. Senate to challenge incumbent Senator John Warner. Future Virginia Governor Mark Warner (no relation) won the nomination at the 1996 Virginia Democratic Convention, garnering 1,889 delegates to Byrne's 231. He lost to Senator Warner in the general election.

In 1998, Byrne began work at the United States Information Agency, advising its director on the au pair program.

Byrne returned to elected office in 1999 when she was elected to the Senate of Virginia, winning a very close election against two-term incumbent Republican Jane Woods (45.52% to Woods's 45.39%). She left the Senate after one term, choosing not to seek reelection after she was drawn into the same district as another Democratic incumbent during redistricting. In the Virginia Senate, she sponsored legislation to prohibit people from sleeping in rooms except bedrooms, a response to complaints of students and poor immigrants crowded into residential houses.

Byrne was the 2005 Democratic Party candidate for Lieutenant Governor of Virginia. Republican Party candidate Bill Bolling defeated her in the November 8, 2005 general election by 1.2%.

=== 2008 congressional race ===
In 2008, Byrne ran for the Democratic nomination for Virginia's 11th congressional district, the seat she held from 1993 to 1995. The incumbent Republican, Thomas M. Davis, had announced he would not seek reelection. In the primary election on June 10, 2008, she faced Gerald Connolly, chairman of the Fairfax County Board of Supervisors, and others in a multicandidate field. Connolly defeated Byrne 58% to 33% and went on to defeat Republican Keith Fimian in the general election.

== Personal life ==
She is married to Larry Byrne, who is president of an international consulting firm. They have two grown children and three grandchildren.

== Election results ==
Democratic Primary for Virginia's 11th District, 2008
Party	Candidate	Votes	%	±%
Democratic	Gerry Connolly	14,233	57.9	
Democratic	Leslie Byrne	8,196	33.4	
Democratic	Doug Denneny	1,508	6.1	
Democratic	Lori Alexander	638	2.6	

General election for Virginia Lt. Governor, 2005
Party	Candidate	Votes	%	±%
Republican	Bill Bolling	979,265	50.5	
Democratic	Leslie Byrne	956,906	49.3	
Write-in		4,065	0.2	

Democratic Primary for Virginia Lt. Governor, 2005
Party	Candidate	Votes	%	±%
Democratic	Leslie Byrne	37,904	32.8	
Democratic	Viola Baskerville	30,083	26.1	
Democratic	Chapman Petersen	24,992	21.7	
Democratic	Phillip Puckett	22,400	19.4	

Virginia Senate election for the 34th District, 1999
Party	Candidate	Votes	%	±%
Democratic	Leslie Byrne	13,719	45.5	
Republican	Jane Woods (Incumbent)	13,682	45.4	
Independent	Virginia Dobey	2,726	9.0	

U.S. House election for Virginia's 11th District, 1994
Party	Candidate	Votes	%	±%
Republican	Thomas M. Davis	98,216	52.9	+7.7
Democratic	Leslie Byrne (Incumbent)	84,104	45.3	−4.7
Independent	Gordon Cruickshank	3,246	1.8	

U.S. House election for Virginia's 11th District, 1992
Party	Candidate	Votes	%	±%
Democratic	Leslie Byrne	114,172	50.0	
Republican	Henry N. Butler	103,119	45.2	
Independent	Arthur T. Narro	6,681	2.9	
Independent	Perry Mitchell	4,155	1.8	

Virginia House of Delegates election for the 38th District, 1991
Party	Candidate	Votes	%	±%
Democratic	Leslie Byrne (Incumbent)	8,017	60.5	+3.8
Republican	Norman Caron	5,226	39.5	−3.8

Virginia House of Delegates election for the 38th District, 1989
Party	Candidate	Votes	%	±%
Democratic	Leslie Byrne (Incumbent)	10,485	56.7	+4.3
Republican	A. Strode Brent Jr.	8,018	43.3	−4.3

Virginia House of Delegates election for the 38th District, 1987
Party	Candidate	Votes	%	±%
Democratic	Leslie Byrne (Incumbent)	8,172	52.4	−2.6
Republican	A. Strode Brent Jr.	7,434	47.6	+2.6

Virginia House of Delegates election for the 38th District, 1985
Party	Candidate	Votes	%	±%
Democratic	Leslie Byrne	8,497	55.0	
Republican	Gwendalyn Cody (Incumbent)	6,941	45.0	

== See also ==
- Women in the United States House of Representatives

U.S. House of Representatives
Constituency reestablished	Member of the U.S. House of Representatives from Virginia's 11th congressional district 1993–1995	Succeeded by Tom Davis
U.S. order of precedence (ceremonial)
Preceded by Charles Douglas III as Former US Representative	Order of precedence of the United States as Former US Representative	Succeeded by Glenn Nye as Former US Representative
