= Joel Johnson (communications strategist) =

American communications strategist (born 1961)

Senior Advisor to the President
- In office 20 May 1999 – 20 January 2001
- President: Bill Clinton
- Preceded by: Sidney Blumenthal; Doug Sosnik
- Succeeded by: Karl Rove

Personal details
- Born: Joel Paul Johnson; 1961 (age 64–65) Elmore, Ohio, U.S.
- Party: Democratic
- Education: University of Maryland, College Park (BA)

Joel Johnson (born 1961) is an American political operative who is the managing director of the Glover Park Group, a strategic communications firm. He was Senior Advisor for Policy and Communications to President Bill Clinton, from 1999 to 2001. Johnson has also worked on the staff of former senators Tom Daschle and Howard Metzenbaum. In 2001, he co-founded The Harbour Group, a public relations company, before leaving to join John Kerry's presidential campaign. Johnson became a managing director of the Glover Park Group in 2005.

== Federal government ==
Johnson joined the staff of Ohio Senator Howard Metzenbaum in 1982, while a student at the University of Maryland. Starting in the mail room, he was later promoted to legislative assistant and then chief of staff. Johnson remained on Metzenbaum's staff until he retired from the Senate in 1994.

In 1994, Johnson assumed the role of executive director of the Democratic Study Group, a legislative service organization in the House of Representatives. The following year, he became an assistant secretary on the staff of South Dakota Senator Tom Daschle. In 1996, Daschle named Johnson the staff director of the Senate Democratic Leadership Committee, specializing in policy and communications strategy. During Johnson's five-year tenure with Daschle, the Pittsburgh Post-Gazette reported that he was a key strategist behind the Democrats' efforts to positively frame their role in the 1995 government shutdown, and he worked on the Democratic Policy Committee as the staff director of leadership communications. He also oversaw the running of the Democratic Senate leadership's television studio, completed in 1996, in the Hart Senate Office Building.

Johnson joined the Clinton administration as a senior legislative advisor in May 1999, handling communications strategies and messaging coordination until Clinton left office in January 2001.

== Private sector ==
Following the end of Clinton's term in office in 2001, Johnson co-founded The Harbour Group, a public relations firm based in Washington, D.C. He held the role of managing director at the firm, which offers public affairs services including lobbying. At The Harbour Group, Johnson's clients included airlines as well as food processing and pharmaceutical companies. He took a leave of absence from The Harbour Group in 2004 to join the communications team of John Kerry's presidential campaign.

In 2005, Johnson became a managing director of the Glover Park Group. He established the firm's government affairs practice, whose clients have included the Recording Industry Association of America, Nextel Communications, and Sodexho Alliance.

Political offices
Preceded by Sidney Blumenthal; Doug Sosnik	Senior Advisor to the President; 1999–2001; Served alongside: Sidney Blumenthal, Doug Sosnik	Succeeded by Karl Rove
