= Kaye Kory =

American politician (born 1947)

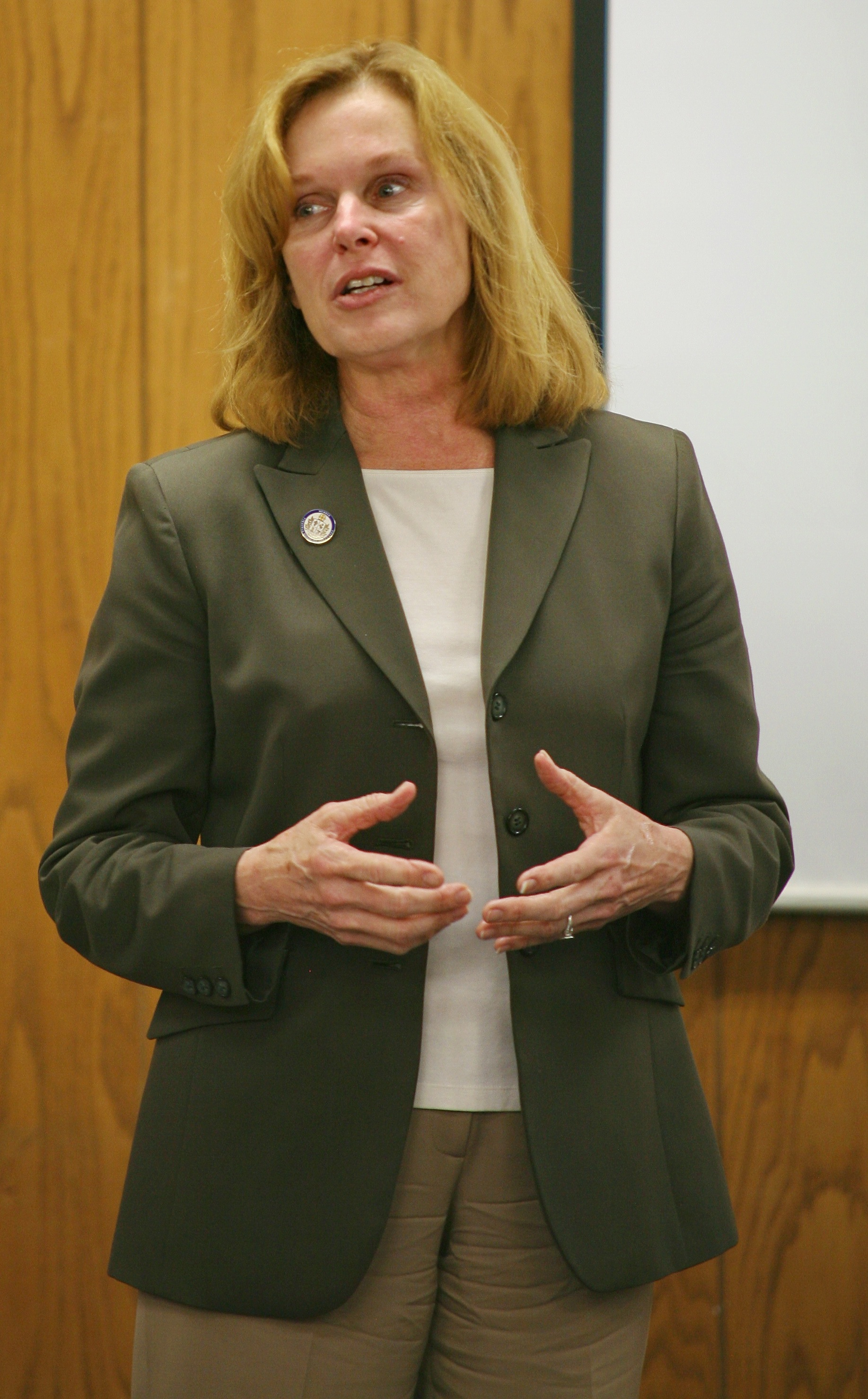
- Kory in 2010

Member of the Virginia House of Delegates from the 38th district
- In office January 13, 2010 – January 10, 2024
- Preceded by: Robert D. Hull
- Succeeded by: Sam Rasoul (redistricting)

Personal details
- Born: April 18, 1947 (age 79) Chicago, Illinois, U.S.
- Party: Democratic
- Spouse(s): Ross C. Kory, Jr.
- Children: 3
- Education: Miami University; University of Iowa; George Mason University
- Committees: Counties Cities and Towns, Science and Technology
- Website: www.kayekory.com

L. Kaye Kory (born April 18, 1947) is an American politician. She served in the Virginia House of Delegates, representing the 38th district in Fairfax County from 2010 to 2024. She served on the Fairfax County School Board 1999–2009. Kory is a member of the Democratic Party.

As of 2020, Kory serves as the Chair of the Counties, Cities Towns Committee and as a member of the Labor and Commerce Committee, Finance Committee, and Public Safety Committee.

== Early life and education ==
Kory was born in Chicago. She attended The American School in Japan, and received a B.A. from Oxford College, now part of Miami University, in Oxford, Ohio, in 1969. She has also attended the University of Iowa and George Mason University.

Kory married Ross C. Kory, Jr. They have three children.

== Community activism ==
Kory became involved with the parent-teacher associations (or, PTA) at her children's schools, and was elected president and treasurer of the Justice High School PTA (formerly J.E.B. Stuart High School).

== Electoral history ==
In June 1999, Kory won a special election for the Fairfax County School Board. Kory won her next three subsequent elections.

In June 2009, Kory upset nine-term Virginia House of Delegates incumbent Robert D. Hull in a Democratic primary. She went on to win the seat in the general election that November.

In the 2019 election, Kory defeated primary challenger Andres Jimenez. In the general election, she was elected unopposed.

| Date | Election | Candidate | Party | Votes | % |
Virginia House of Delegates, 38th district
| June 9, 2009 | Democratic primary | L. Kaye Kory | | 2,535 | 50.64 |
| June 9, 2009 | Democratic primary | Robert D. Hull | | 2,470 | 49.35 |
| November 3, 2009 | General | L. Kaye Kory | Democratic | 9,621 | 59.50 |
| November 3, 2009 | General | Danny R. Smith | Republican | 6,505 | 40.23 |
| November 3, 2009 | General | Write Ins | | 42 | 0.25 |
| November 3, 2009 | General | Incumbent lost in primary; seat stayed Democratic | | | |
| November 8, 2011 | General | L. Kaye Kory | Democratic | 8,106 | 76.43 |
| November 8, 2011 | General | James L. "Jim" Leslie | Independent Green | 2,402 | 22.64 |
| November 8, 2011 | General | Write Ins | | 97 | 0.91 |
| November 5, 2013 | General | L. Kaye Kory | Democratic | 12,534 | 74.66 |
| November 5, 2013 | General | James L. "Jim" Leslie | Independent Green | 4,087 | 24.35 |
| November 3, 2015 | General | L. Kaye Kory | Democratic | 7,819 | 74.65 |
| November 3, 2015 | General | James L. "Jim" Leslie | Independent Green | 2,655 | 25.35 |
| November 7, 2017 | General | L. Kaye Kory | Democratic | 16,023 | 73.51 |
| November 7, 2017 | General | Paul Herring | Republican | 5,723 | 26.26 |
| November 5, 2019 | General | L. Kaye Kory | Democratic | 13,934 | 93.26 |
| November 5, 2019 | General | Write Ins | | 1,007 | 6.74 |
| November 2, 2021 | General | L. Kaye Kory | Democratic | 16,853 | 68.8 |
| November 2, 2021 | General | Tom Pafford | Republican | 7,544 | 30.8 |
