= Gwendalyn F. Cody =

American politician (1922–2021)

Gwendalyn Cody

Member of the Virginia House of Delegates
- In office January 11, 1984 – January 8, 1986
- Preceded by: Nora Anderson Squyres
- Succeeded by: Leslie Byrne
- Constituency: 38th district
- In office January 13, 1982 – January 12, 1983
- Succeeded by: Nora Anderson Squyres
- Constituency: 49th district

Personal details
- Born: April 4, 1922 Richmond, Virginia, U.S.
- Died: May 2, 2021 (aged 99) Annandale, Virginia, U.S.
- Party: Republican
- Education: University of Puget Sound; Washington and Lee University; University of Chicago; University of Maryland

Gwendalyn F. Cody (April 4, 1922 – May 2, 2021) was an American politician who served as a member of the Virginia House of Delegates from 1983 to 1986. She was a policy analyst and educator.

Cody died in May 2021, at the age of 99.
