= Robert D. Hull =

American politician

Member of the Virginia House of Delegates from the 38th district
- In office January 4, 1993 – January 3, 2010
- Preceded by: Leslie L. Byrne
- Succeeded by: Kaye Kory

Personal details
- Born: December 28, 1954 (age 71) Washington, D.C., U.S
- Party: Democratic
- Spouse: Laura M. Connors
- Education: Northern Virginia Community College; Virginia Tech
- Occupation: Real estate agent
- Committees: Counties, Cities and Towns; General Laws

Robert Dale "Bob" Hull (born December 28, 1954) is an American politician. A Democrat, he was elected to the Virginia House of Delegates in a December 1992 special election. He represented the 38th district, made up of part of Fairfax County.

Hull was challenged by Kaye Kory, who represented Mason District on the Fairfax County School Board, in the June 9, 2009, primary for the Democratic nomination in the 38th House of Delegates district (Fairfax County, Mason, and Providence magisterial districts), and lost the election by a narrow margin.
