= Belle Haven Consultants =

American for-profit organization

- Company type: For-profit organization
- Industry: Consulting and lobbying
- Founded: 1997
- Founders: Edwin Feulner; Ken Sheffer
- Headquarters: Suite 401, Baskerville House, Central, Hong Kong, Hong Kong, Hong Kong
- Key people: Ken Sheffer (principal and chief operating officer); Linda Feulner (partner and senior advisor); Malcolm Wallop (lobbyist)

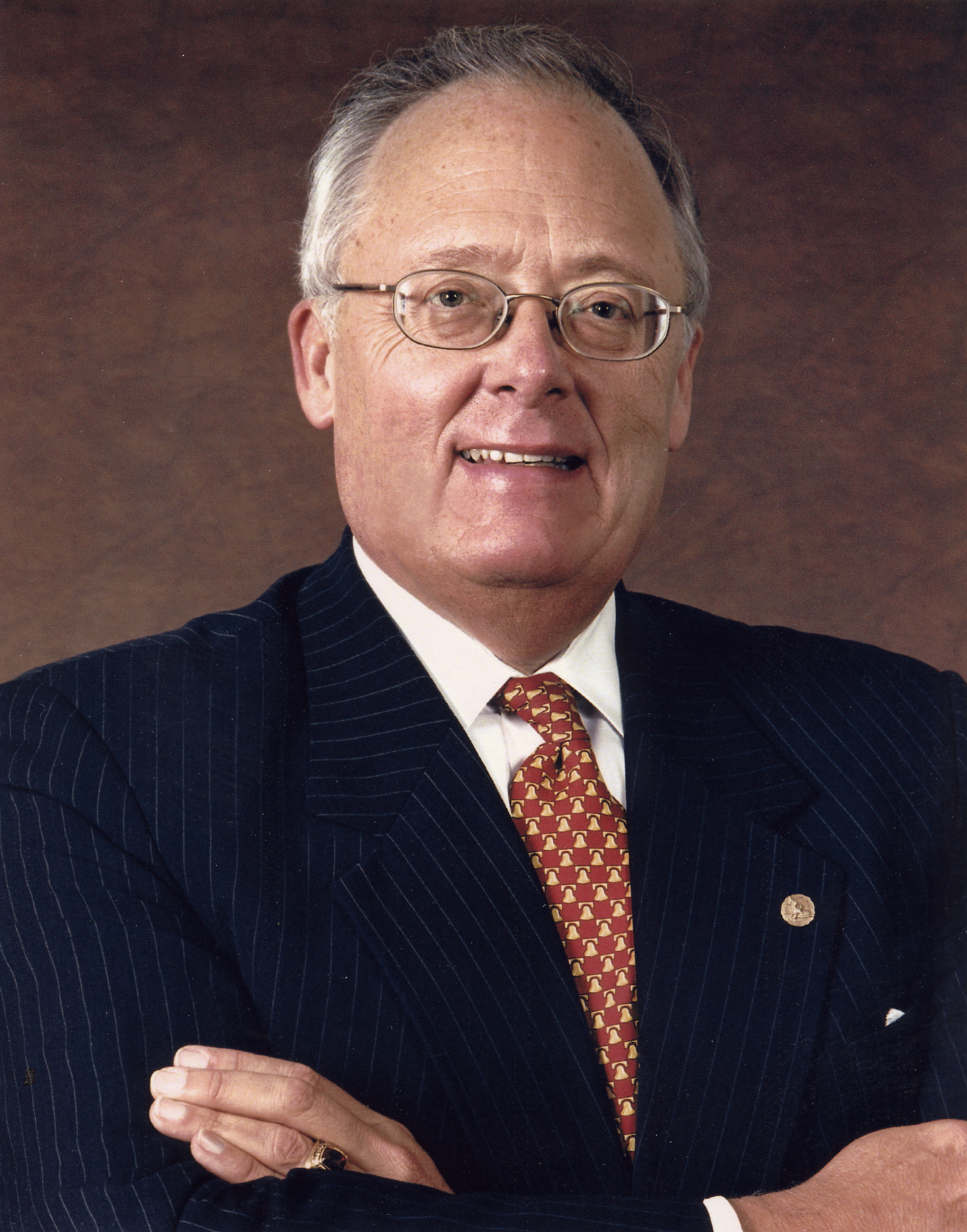
Edwin Feulner, who co-founded Belle Haven Consultants in 1997 with Ken Sheffer

Belle Haven Consultants was a for-profit, Hong Kong–based organization with links to the Heritage Foundation and the Malaysian government. It was founded in 1997 by former Heritage Foundation president Edwin Feulner and Heritage Foundation Asia policy expert Ken Sheffer, who served as Belle Haven's principal and chief operating officer.

Feulner's wife, Linda Feulner, later took her husband's place as a partner and paid senior advisor to Belle Haven Consultants. She also worked as a consultant at the Alexander Strategy Group. Former Wyoming senator Malcolm Wallop was hired as a lobbyist for Belle Haven.

== History ==
Belle Haven, the Heritage Foundation, and the Alexander Strategy Group (ASG) shared the same office in Hong Kong, located in Suite 401 of the Baskerville House office building in Central Hong Kong. Belle Haven was a subcontractor, then was purchased by ASG partner Edward Stewart, co-owner of the firm along with long-time associate Beth Allison Cave. In 2006, ASG closed as a result of the Jack Abramoff lobbying scandals.

By the end of 2001, Belle Haven hired ASG for help "promoting and advocating Malaysia's positive investment climate and business opportunities" in connection with a company called PK Baru Energy. A new group called the US-Malaysia Exchange Association also hired ASG for support "enhancing the bilateral relationship between Malaysia and the US." In a 2004 interview, Megat Junid, an associate of then-prime minister Mahathir Mohamad, said that he organized Malaysia Exchange after talks with Edwin Feulner, the president of the Heritage Foundation.

In 2001, U.S. Representative Tom DeLay, the House Majority Leader, and three other congressmen traveled to Malaysia with their spouses on a trip officially sponsored by Heritage. Heritage senior fellow and former U.S. Senator Malcolm Wallop, who went on the trip, told Time magazine that Belle Haven's financial involvement was more important to the trip than Heritage's.

In late September 2001, Ed Buckham, DeLay's former chief of staff, became a subcontractor to Belle Haven Consultants, earning $620,000 from the relationship over the next two years.

In the following months, more congressmen made their way to Kuala Lumpur, the capital of Malaysia and senior Malaysian officials began beating a path to Washington, D.C., an interchange that climaxed with Mahathir visiting the White House in May 2002, which was his first state visit in eight years. Though in past years Heritage had been publicly critical of Mahathir, Feulner hosted a dinner reception on that visit to honor the prime minister.

According to documents filed with the U.S. Justice Department by Alexander Strategy Group, Belle Haven paid ASG at least $620,000 in fees originating with Malaysian business interests. Belle Haven also hired the Harbour Group, around the same time, to support its Malaysian campaign, paying them a total of $240,000.
