= Tina Brozman =

American judge

Tina L. Brozman (October 7, 1952 – June 26, 2007) was a former chief judge of the United States Bankruptcy Court for the Southern District of New York and co-leader of Bingham McCutchen's financial restructuring group. Brozman retired from the bench in 2000 to join Bingham.

== Legal career ==
In 1985, aged 32, Brozman became the youngest bankruptcy lawyer appointed in the Second Circuit. During her time on the bench, she issued more than 150 decisions, many of which had a major impact on bankruptcies involving multinational corporations.

Brozman was a judge on the 1991 bankruptcy case of the British company Maxwell Communication Corp., the former parent of the New York Daily News. The work involved significant proceedings between New York and London, and Brozman's cooperation with Lord Hoffman of England's High Court helped define the standard for multinational bankruptcies.

The United Nations later adopted policies Brozman set out in that case for its model law on cross-border insolvencies. The Chapter 15 addition to the U.S. Bankruptcy Code in 2005 also was based on Brozman's work in the Maxwell insolvency.

Most recently, Brozman had supervised a team of lawyers who sorted through the multibillion-dollar Refco restructuring case. The court-appointed trustee asked Brozman to provide legal counsel because of her experience, and despite having been diagnosed with ovarian cancer, she told him she would devote "every well hour" she had to the case. Within 10 weeks, and after working with nearly 30 lawyers from different parties, Brozman and her team had helped the court-appointed trustee settle the case.

Brozman was named one of the 50 Most Influential Women Lawyers in America by The National Law Journal. In May 2007, the UJA-Federation of New York's bankruptcy and reorganization group unanimously selected Brozman as the 2007 recipient of the Professor Lawrence P. King Award for her contributions to the bankruptcy field. In July 2016, Law360.com named Brozman one of the five Most Influential Bankruptcy Judges in History.

== Personal life ==
Tina Brozman was born as Tina Lesser on October 7, 1952, in Mamaroneck, New York. She earned a B.A. from New York University in 1973 and her law degree from Fordham University in 1976.

She died after a two-year battle with ovarian cancer on June 26, 2007, aged 54, survived by her husband, son and twin daughters.

Before her death, Tina asked her family and close friends to create The Honorable Tina Brozman Foundation for Ovarian Cancer Research or "Tina's Wish", a not-for-profit foundation dedicated to early detection and effective screening methods for ovarian cancer. Tina's Wish was established in 2008 with the mission of reducing the number of lives impacted and lost by late-stage diagnoses such as Tina's. Since its inception, Tina's Wish has grown into the third-largest independent funding source for ovarian cancer research in the United States. In 2013, researchers from several institutions, including Dana-Farber Cancer Institute, Johns Hopkins Kimmel Cancer Center, Memorial Sloan Kettering Cancer Center, University of Pennsylvania Ovarian Cancer Research Center, and Yale School of Medicine/Yale Cancer Center, combined their efforts as members of The Tina Brozman Ovarian Cancer Research Consortium, the only nongovernmental consortium devoted to ovarian cancer. Through the consortium, Tina's Wish promotes collaborative science working transparently to achieve Brozman's mission efficiently and with maximum impact.
