= Edwin Feulner =

American political scientist (1941–2025)

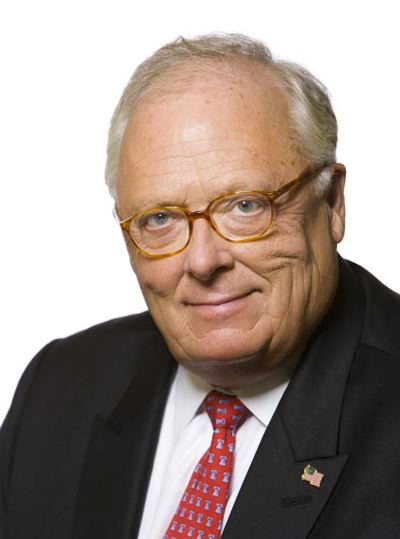
- Feulner in 2011

President of the Heritage Foundation
- In office May 2, 2017 – January 1, 2018
- Preceded by: Jim DeMint
- Succeeded by: Kay Coles James
- In office February 16, 1977 – April 4, 2013
- Preceded by: Frank Walton
- Succeeded by: Jim DeMint

Personal details
- Born: Edwin John Feulner Jr. August 12, 1941 Chicago, Illinois, U.S.
- Died: July 18, 2025 (aged 83) Alexandria, Virginia, U.S.
- Party: Republican
- Spouse: Linda Leventhal
- Children: 2
- Education: Regis University (BA); University of Pennsylvania (MBA); University of Edinburgh (PhD)
- Awards: Presidential Citizens Medal (1989)

Edwin John Feulner Jr. (/ˈfʊlnər/; August 12, 1941 – July 18, 2025) was an American political scientist, think tank executive, congressional aide and foreign relations consultant who was co-founder of The Heritage Foundation, a conservative think tank in 1973. He served as the Heritage Foundation's president from 1977 to 2013 and again from 2017 to 2018.

== Early life and education ==
Feulner was born in Chicago, Illinois, on August 12, 1941, to Helen Joan (née Franzen) and Edwin John Feulner, the owner of a Chicago real estate firm. He had three sisters: Mary Ann, Joan, and Barbara. The family were devout Roman Catholic German Americans. Three of his maternal uncles were parish priests.

Feulner attended Immaculate Conception High School in Elmhurst, Illinois, and Regis University in Denver, where he graduated with a BA degree in English in 1963. He attended the Wharton School of Business at the University of Pennsylvania, where he received an MBA in 1964. He was a Richard M. Weaver Fellow at Georgetown University and the London School of Economics.

In 1981, he received a PhD in political science from the University of Edinburgh in Scotland, where his doctoral thesis, The Evolution of the Republican Study Committee, was on the Republican Study Committee, a group of conservative Republicans in the U.S. House of Representatives.

== Career ==
=== Congressional aide ===
Feulner began his career as an analyst for the Center for Strategic and International Studies (then called the Center for Strategic Studies). He later became a congressional aide to Wisconsin Republican Melvin Laird. Feulner subsequently became a long-serving executive assistant to Illinois Republican congressman Phil Crane. He also served as executive director of the Republican Study Committee.

=== The Heritage Foundation ===
Feulner was a founding trustee of the Heritage Foundation from its founding in 1973 until 1977. Four years after its founding, in 1977, he left Representative Crane's office to become the foundation's president. At the time, the foundation had only nine employees.

As president of the foundation, Feulner made the foundation more aggressive, market-driven, and less ivory tower, and began publishing easily-accessible, concise studies. By focusing the foundation's marketing, he helped transform the foundation from a small operation into a booming enterprise of conservative ideals, eventually creating a think tank that Newt Gingrich, in a New York Times column, called "the Parthenon of the conservative metropolis." The new marketing strategy was called the "briefcase test", a concept that revolutionized the influence of think tanks on public policy and boosted Heritage's popularity, referring to a focus on easily accessed, timely, concise research that could fit in a briefcase. Additionally, the foundation's policy reports and papers were published ahead of related legislation rather than after it had been passed, as most think tanks did at the time. Feulner told The Washington Examiner: "it doesn't do us any good to have great ideas if we are not out there peddling our products."

Within a year and a half of Feulner becoming president, Heritage's budget increased to $2.5 million and its donor pool grew to about 120,000. Under his leadership, Heritage ultimately grew to 250 employees and, with annual income of about $80 million and a donor pool of about 600,000, became one of the world's largest think tanks.

In 1997, Feulner and Heritage's Asia policy expert Ken Sheffer co-founded Belle Haven Consultants, a Hong Kong-based for-profit consulting firm that represented Malaysia-based clients. Belle Haven Consultants, in turn, paid over $1 million in fees to lobbying firms, which ultimately registered with the U.S. Department of Justice as foreign agents under the Foreign Agents Registration Act.

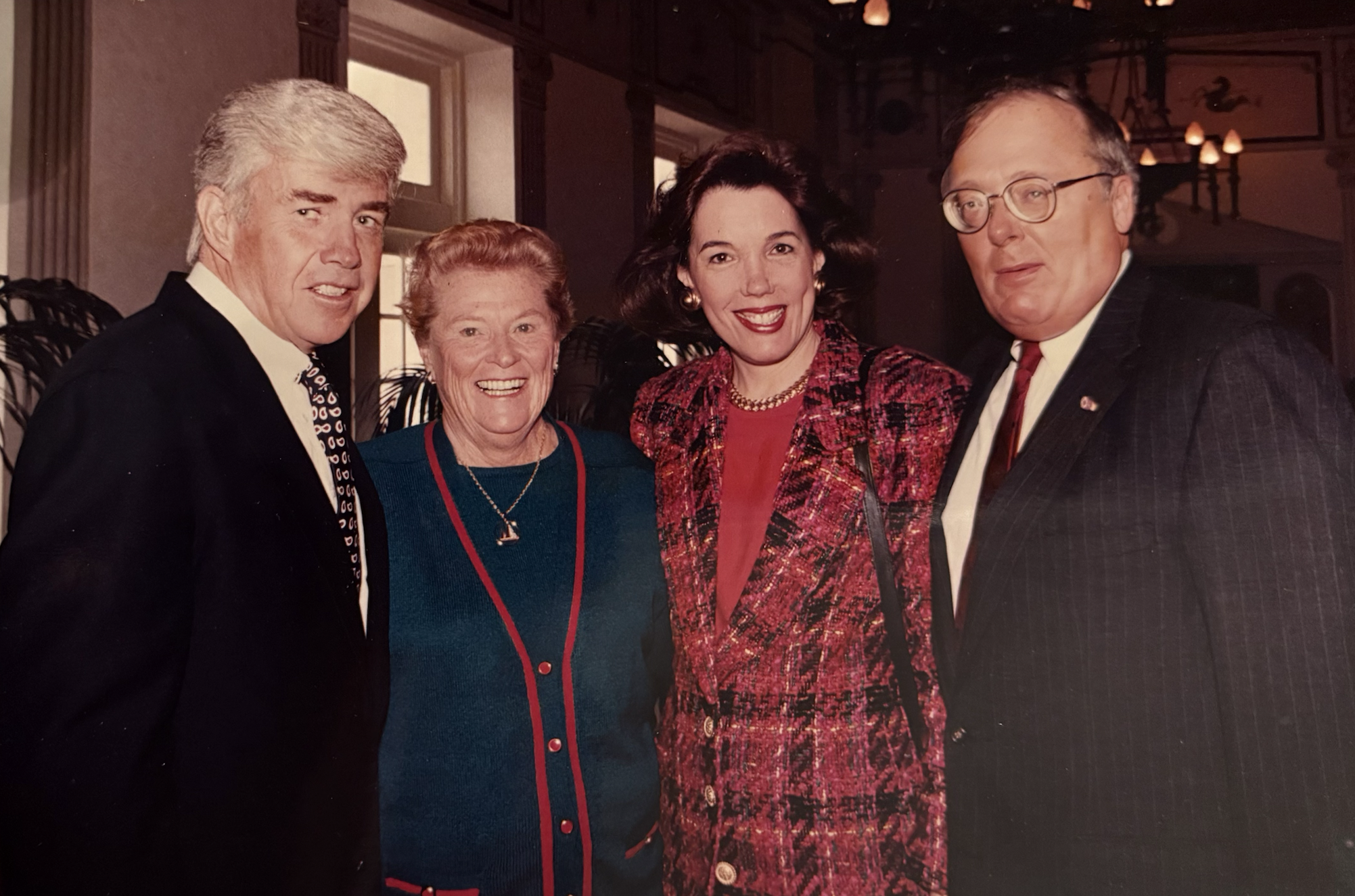
Feulner with Secretary Jack Kemp and Marion Wells in 1999

In April 2005, The Washington Post reported that the Heritage Foundation softened its criticism of the Malaysian government after Feulner initiated a business relationship with Malaysian prime minister Mahathir Mohamad. "Heritage's new, pro-Malaysian outlook emerged at the same time a Hong Kong consulting firm co-founded by Edwin J. Feulner, Heritage's president, began representing Malaysian business interests. The for-profit firm, called Belle Haven Consultants, retains Feulner's wife, Linda Feulner, as a "senior adviser". And Belle Haven's chief operating officer, Ken Sheffer, is the former head of Heritage's Asia office and is still on Heritage's payroll as a $75,000-a-year consultant," The Washington Post reported. The Heritage Foundation responded by denying any conflict of interest, stating that its views on Malaysia changed following the country's cooperation with the U.S. after the September 11 attacks, and the Malaysian government "moving in the right economic and political direction."

In January 2013, Feulner published a column, "Economic Freedom on the Wane", reviewing the findings of the foundation's annual Index of Economic Freedom, an ongoing joint project between The Wall Street Journal and the Heritage Foundation since 1997, measuring individual country's policies in the broad areas of rule of law, limited government, regulatory efficiency, and open markets.

In 2023, Feulner retired as chairman of Heritage's board of trustees, a role he briefly resumed in 2017 following the 2016 election of Donald Trump.

In September 2023, Feulner endorsed Mike Pence in the 2024 Republican presidential primaries; Pence dropped out of the race the following month.

Feulner wrote the afterword for the Project 2025 policy guide, titled "Onward!", published in April 2024.

=== Other roles ===
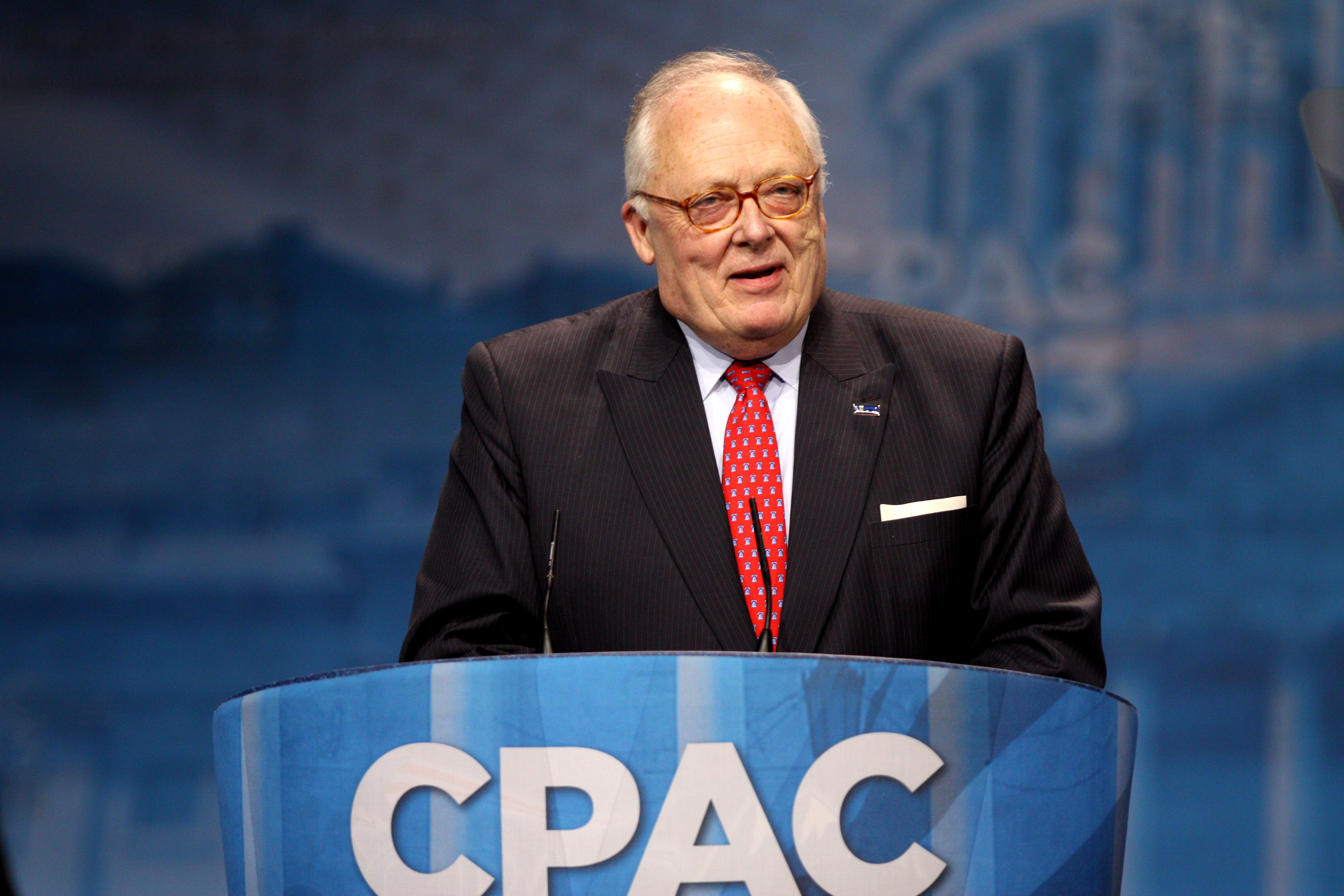
Feulner speaking at the 2013 Conservative Political Action Conference in National Harbor, Maryland

In 2014, Feulner served as president and treasurer of the Mont Pelerin Society. He served as a trustee and as chairman of the board of the Intercollegiate Studies Institute. He was also a member of the board of the National Chamber Foundation, the Institut d'Etudes Politiques, and the board of trustees and a life trustee of Regis University, his undergraduate alma mater.

He became a member of the advisory council of the Victims of Communism Memorial Foundation, and was the foundation's chair in 2021.

Among other executive and advisory roles, Feulner was president of the Philadelphia Society from 1982 to 1983 and from 2013 to 2014, and was a onetime director of the Council for National Policy, the Acton Institute, and George Mason University. Feulner served as a member of the Gingrich–Mitchell Congressional UN Reform Task Force in 2005 and of the Meltzer Commission from 1999 to 2000. He was vice chairman of the National Commission on Economic Growth and Tax Reform, known as the Kemp Commission, from 1995 to 1996. He was the chairman of the U.S. Advisory Commission on Public Diplomacy from 1982 to 1991, a consultant on domestic policy to U.S. president Ronald Reagan, and an adviser to several government departments and agencies.

== Awards and distinctions ==
In 1989, Feulner received the Presidential Citizens Medal, the second-highest civilian award in the United States. He was awarded eleven honorary degrees, and received honors from the governments of Taiwan, South Korea, and the Czech Republic.

In 2007, GQ magazine listed him as one of the "50 most powerful people in D.C." In 2007 and 2010, Daily Telegraph named him "one of the 100 most influential conservatives in America". In 2009, Karl Rove, writing in Forbes, listed him as the sixth-most powerful conservative in Washington, D.C.

== Personal life and death ==
Feulner and his wife, Linda Claire (née Leventhal), lived in Alexandria, Virginia, for over 50 years. They had two children.

Feulner died at home in Alexandria, on July 18, 2025, at the age of 83.

== Bibliography ==
- Looking Back (The Heritage Foundation, 1981). ASIN B0006E54OC, OCLC 8740675.
- Conservatives Stalk the House (Green Hill, 1983). ISBN 0898031125.
- The March of Freedom (Spence Publishing Company, 1998). ISBN 978-0965320887.
- Intellectual Pilgrims (Mont Pelerin Society, 1999). ISBN 978-0891950790.
- Leadership for America: The Principles of Conservatism (Spence Publishing Company, 2000). ISBN 978-1890626228.
- Getting America Right (co-authored with Doug Wilson; Crown Forum, 2006). ISBN 978-0307336910.
- The American Spirit (co-authored with Brian Tracy; Thomas Nelson, 2012). ISBN 978-1595553379.

== See also ==
- The Heritage Foundation's Asian Studies Center
