= Bingham McCutchen =

Defunct global law firm

Bingham McCutchen LLP
- Headquarters: One Federal Street; Boston, Massachusetts
- No. of offices: 14
- No. of attorneys: approximately 700
- No. of employees: approximately 1,600
- Major practice areas: Financial restructuring, securities, litigation, antitrust, private equity, corporate finance, government affairs
- Key people: Jay S. Zimmerman (Chairman)
- Date founded: 1891
- Company type: Limited Liability Partnership
- Dissolved: 2015
- Website: Bingham.com

Bingham McCutchen LLP was a global law firm with approximately 850 attorneys in nine US offices and five international offices. It ceased operations in late 2015, when several hundred of its partners and associate lawyers left the firm to join Philadelphia-based Morgan Lewis.

== History ==
Bingham, Dana & Gould was founded in Boston in 1891.

From 1997, the company experienced sharp growth in the number of attorneys, offices, and revenues by absorbing other law firms. In 1997, Bingham Dana acquired the 30-lawyer Japanese practice group of Marks & Murase, giving the firm offices in New York and Los Angeles and a strong base of Japanese institutional clients. The next outpost was established in Hartford through a merger with 55-lawyer Hebb & Gitlin, a firm that concentrated on international bankruptcy work. In 2001, Bingham Dana bulked up in New York City through a merger with Richards & O'Neil, a boutique law firm of 55 attorneys known for its litigation and corporate groups. The next year, in 2002, Bingham Dana merged with San Francisco–based law firm McCutchen, Doyle, Brown & Enersen to form 800-lawyer Bingham McCutchen. McCutchen Doyle brought five offices and a litigation and intellectual property focus. In 2003, the firm expanded in Southern California by merging with corporate boutique Riordan & McKinzie. 2006 saw a merger between Bingham McCutchen and Swidler Berlin Shereff Friedman, a Washington, D.C.–based firm which brought greater capabilities in the nation's capital as well as a regulatory group. Bingham also launched in Hong Kong that same year. In 2007, the firm acquired Los Angeles litigation shop Alschuler Grossman. In July 2009, Bingham McCutchen acquired McKee Nelson, a midsize law firm specializing in tax law and structured finance.

A team of Bingham attorneys and staff, led by Susan Baker Manning and Sabin Willett, represented pro bono a dozen Uighur men held in extrajudicial detention in the United States Guantanamo Bay detention camps, in Cuba. Bingham litigated a number of habeas corpus cases on behalf of the Uighur clients, as well as cases under the Detainee Treatment Act of 2005 that brought to light evidentiary and procedural flaws in the 2004–05 Combatant Status Review Tribunals that were used to justify the Uighurs' ongoing imprisonment. All Bingham clients were subsequently released.

The Tokyo office of Bingham McCutchen became one of the largest law firms in Japan by its 2007 merger with a domestic law firm headed by Hideyuki Sakai, an insolvency specialist. Unlike most foreign firms in Japan which have minimal domestic practices, Bingham's Tokyo office was predominantly staffed by Japanese attorneys and handled domestic matters such as the restructuring of Olympus Corporation, though it hired a number of foreign attorneys since 2012 in an attempt to strengthen its outbound and cross-border practice and to expand in other legal fields such as intellectual property and investment funds.

Despite a deep recession which hurt law firms nationwide, The Boston Globe reported that Bingham performed very well financially. In 2009, Bingham's gross revenues increased 12% and profits per partner increased 2%. Chairman Jay Zimmerman was quoted as saying "We’ve had our best year ever." However, despite an increase in revenues, Bingham froze salaries, and in March 2009 laid off 16 attorneys and 29 support staff.

=== Collapse ===
Bingham experienced internal tensions following the 2002 McCutchen merger, and again following the 2009 McKee merger. Both transactions were viewed as "mergers of equals" among some insiders, and as unequal acquisitions among others. The McKee transaction involved large compensation guarantees to several key McKee partners which were not immediately disclosed to other Bingham partners. The legacy McKee partners continued to earn relatively high compensation following the acquisition due to the fact that they charged higher hourly rates than the legacy Bingham partners; the legacy Bingham partners nonetheless demanded salary matching, which strained the profits of the firm.

Bingham experienced a massive downsizing from 2012 to 2014, during which time it cut 225 lawyers and saw more than 50 partners leave the firm. Two major cases—the Deepwater Horizon litigation and an IP dispute involving Oracle Corporation—ended abruptly, reducing the firm's revenue. Bingham attempted to cut costs by moving back office functions to a new center in Kentucky, but the initial cost of the move (about $100,000 per equity partner) hurt the firm's 2014 financial results even further. After Bingham's collapse, it was revealed that Massachusetts Mutual Life Insurance stopped working with Bingham due to the low level of racial diversity among its partners in its Boston and Hartford offices.

In November 2014, 227 of around 300 partners and a similar number of associates joined the Philadelphia-based firm of Morgan Lewis & Bockius. Morgan Lewis paid off Bingham's debt as part of the deal, and shut down Bingham's Kentucky operations center, relocating some employees to Philadelphia.

Bingham's London and Frankfurt offices joined Akin Gump Strauss Hauer & Feld. 50 of Bingham's 60 lawyers in Tokyo moved to the Japanese law firm of Anderson Mori & Tomotsune, with the remainder joining Morgan Lewis.

== Offices ==
As of 2014, Bingham McCutchen had offices in Beijing, Boston, Hartford, Hong Kong, Lexington, London, Los Angeles, New York, Orange County, San Francisco, Santa Monica, California, Silicon Valley, Tokyo, and Washington, D.C. It also offered consulting services through subsidiaries Bingham Consulting and Bingham Strategic Advisors.

== Notable people ==
- Tina Brozman (former chief judge of the United States Bankruptcy Court for the Southern District of New York)
- Denise Jefferson Casper (judge, United States District Court for the District of Massachusetts)
- Christopher Cox (former Chairman, U.S. Securities and Exchange Commission, and former U.S. Representative)
- Barry Goode (retired from the firm in 2001 to join state government, and now is a Contra Costa County judge)
- Thurgood Marshall, Jr. (former Clinton White House Cabinet Secretary)
- Steve Merrill (former Governor of New Hampshire)
- Richard Riordan (former Mayor of Los Angeles)
- Josiah Spaulding
- Sabin Willett
- Pete Wilson (former Governor of California and former U.S. Senator)
