= Jennifer Safavian =

Jennifer McLaughlin Safavian is an American lawyer, trade association executive, and former Congressional committee staff member. She is currently the president and CEO of Autos Drive America, a trade association representing the U.S. operations of international auto manufacturers doing business in the United States.

== Career ==
Prior to her government service, Safavian was in private law practice. She worked at Plunkett & Cooney in Detroit, Michigan from 1993 to 1995. She worked at Dombroff & Gilmore in Washington, D.C. from 1996 to 1997.

From July 1997 until March 2000, Safavian worked for the House Government Reform Committee where, in March 1998, she was named chief counsel and later deputy staff director for the Subcommittee on the Census. She helped the committee investigate campaign finance issues. During her tenure at the Subcommittee on the Census, Safavian conducted oversight of the Department of Commerce's census operations and participated in negotiations with the administration to resolve the dispute surrounding the use of statistical sampling in the 2000 census.

From 2000 to 2001, she served in the Office of the Independent Counsel as associate independent counsel under Robert W. Ray, the successor to Kenneth Starr.

Safavian returned to Congress as a lawyer for the House Committee on Energy and Commerce in 2001, where she remained until 2003. While working for this committee she handled matters related to discovery and investigations. She helped members hold hearings and reviewed proposed legislation. After the September 11th terrorist attacks, Safavian visited sites around the United States relevant to the committee’s work to collect information to help improve security.

From 2003 to 2010, Safavian worked as chief counsel for the House Committee on Oversight and Government Reform. In this position, she supervised a group of about 20 attorneys.

In 2011, Safavian became general counsel and staff director for the oversight subcommittee of the House Committee on Ways and Means. She managed more than 50 lawyers and other staff members. She helped develop policy in the areas of international trade, taxes, and health care. Her work for Ways and Means was also of an investigative nature.

Safavian served as executive vice president for government affairs for the Retail Industry Leaders Association, joining the association in 2015. She handled state and federal issues related to computer security, the application of sales taxes to online retailers, and tax reform.

In 2017, 2018, 2019, and 2021 Safavian was named a “Top Lobbyist” by The Hill.

In early 2020, Safavian became President and CEO of Autos Drive America, an automotive trade association.

== Education ==
Safavian graduated with a bachelor of science degree from Saint Louis University in 1991.

Safavian graduated from Michigan State University’s Detroit College of Law in 1994. She served as managing editor of her school’s law review.

== Family ==
Safavian is married to David Safavian. They married in 1995 and have two children.
