= Alexander Strategy Group =

American lobbying firm

Alexander Strategy Group was an American lobbying firm involved in the K Street Project. The firm was founded by Ed Buckham, a former chief of staff to House Majority Leader Tom Delay, and his wife Wendy. The firm openly promoted its access to DeLay. Its chief lobbyist was Paul Behrends, who became Dana Rohrabacher's aide.

In January 2006, the firm was shut down. Buckham said that it was fatally damaged by publicity about the ongoing federal investigation into the actions of convicted lobbyist Jack Abramoff.

== Clients ==
In 2004 the firm had US$8.8 million in revenues, with prominent clients such as Amgen, BellSouth, Eli Lilly and Company, Freddie Mac, Fannie Mae, R.J. Reynolds, Koch Industries, Microsoft, Time Warner, Enron, and the United Parcel Service.

Other notable clients included Blackwater Security Services, the employer of the contractors killed in Fallujah during the Iraq War in 2004, and PerfectWave, the defense contracting firm owned by Brent R. Wilkes, under investigation for bribing Duke Cunningham.

=== Connections to Abramoff ===
The Mississippi Band of Choctaw Indians were clients of the firm at the same time that they employed lobbyist Jack Abramoff.

ASG was paid more than $1 million by the U.S. Family Network, a nonprofit organization that Buckham helped create in 1996 while he was still working for DeLay. The non-profit's total revenue during its existence (it closed in 2001) was $3.02 million, most of which came from clients of Jack Abramoff.

=== Connections to The Heritage Foundation and Malaysian government ===
From August 30 to September 4, 2001, Buckham joined (at his own expense) a trip funded by The Heritage Foundation to Malaysia. Also on the trip were U.S. Representatives Tom DeLay, Ileana Ros-Lehtinen (R-FL) and Ander Crenshaw (R-FL) and their spouses, as well as Edwin Feulner and his wife Linda Feulner, and Ken Sheffer. The Feulners and Sheffer were principals of both The Heritage Foundation and the lobbying firm Belle Haven Consultants.

On September 27, 2001, Belle Haven hired ASG to represent Malaysian interests. According to U.S. Senate lobbying records, Belle Haven paid ASG $620,000 over two years "on behalf of unspecified Malaysian business interests seeking to present a positive image of their country in the United States". ASG did not register as a foreign agent, as the contract was not explicitly on behalf of the Malaysian government. At the end of 2004, Belle Haven, representing the government of Malaysia, signed a contract with ASG for $840,000 over ten months. ASG filed as a foreign agent.

Virtually all of the money ASG reported receiving from Belle Haven related to the Malaysian advocacy. In addition, the US-Malaysia Exchange Association also hired ASG for support "enhancing the bilateral relationship between Malaysia and the US." Malaysia Exchange directly paid Alexander Strategy less than $20,000 a year, according to Senate records.

The Heritage Foundation, Belle Haven, and ASG shared the same office in Hong Kong.

== Partners and employees ==
The firm employed several former Tom DeLay aides, including Karl Gallant and former DeLay deputy chief of staff Tony Rudy, who pleaded guilty for conspiracy involving Jack Abramoff. It also employed Brian Darling, the former legal counsel to Republican Senator Mel Martinez of Florida; Darling resigned after admitting he was the author of the Schiavo memo.

ASG paid Christine DeLay, Tom DeLay's wife, $115,000 during the period from 1998 to 2002, as a consultant, and paid Linda Feulner (see Belle Haven, above) as a consultant, and hired Julie Doolittle, wife of Congressman John Doolittle, to do bookkeeping for a nonprofit group that Buckham created called the Korea-U.S. Exchange Council. Julie Doolittle received a subpoena from the grand jury investigating Jack Abramoff.

One of the partners in ASG, Edward Stewart, purchased Belle Haven Consultants from Edwin Feulner and his wife Linda in late 2001.
