= Ed Buckham =

Chief of Staff to U.S. representatives since 1995

Edwin A. Buckham is Chief of Staff to U.S. Representative Marjorie Taylor Greene. He is a longtime congressional staffer and former lobbyist.

He served as chief of staff to then Majority Whip Tom DeLay from approximately 1995 to 1998. Buckham had run the House Republican Study Committee in the early 1990s, while Tom DeLay was the Committee's Chairman, where Buckham hired Jim Backlin, also of Maranatha Campus Ministries, now Vice President for Legislative Affairs for the Christian Coalition previously run by Ralph Reed. He was a lobbyist for the American Traffic Safety Services Association from 2004-2005.

Buckham is a lay (non-ordained) evangelical minister, who served as an elder of the Washington D.C. chapter of the controversial and politically active church Maranatha Campus Ministries, and later as a deacon of a small church in Frederick, Maryland.

== Abramoff scandal ==
Most of the $3.02 million in revenues of the U.S. Family Network came from clients of Jack Abramoff. $1,022,729 of that money was then paid by USFN to Buckham and his wife, Wendy, during a five-year period ending in 2001, via their lobbying firm, the Alexander Strategy Group.

In January 2006 Buckham closed Alexander Strategy Group, and left the lobbying business. Buckham said that the company was fatally damaged by publicity from the federal investigation into the affairs of Abramoff.
