= Tony Rudy =

American politician (born 1966)

Tony Charles Rudy (born May 3, 1966) is an American politician. He served in the office of U. S. Representative Tom DeLay (R-TX) from approximately 1995 to 2001, and rose to be his deputy Chief of Staff.

Rudy then began working with Jack Abramoff at Greenberg Traurig. Rudy was implicated in the Jack Abramoff Indian lobbying scandal as unindicted co-conspirator "Staffer A". In 2006, Rudy pleaded guilty to one charge of conspiracy and agreed to cooperate with investigators. Tom DeLay ("Representative #2") and Bob Ney ("Representative #1") are identified in the plea.

Rudy pleaded guilty on March 31, 2006, was sentenced on April 20, 2012, and served 5 months with 3 years probation, ordered to repay $100,000 and fined $5,000.

== Biography ==
Rudy attended the University of Massachusetts Amherst in the late 1980s. He worked on Capitol Hill for eight years, first for California Congressman Dana Rohrabacher, before leaving to attend law school.

Rudy attended law school at George Mason University, in nearby Arlington, Virginia, between 1992 and 1995. At GMU, he served as head of the Federalist Society. He would later win the 2nd Year Student Moot Court Championship, which was a type of law school debate competition between various two-member teams. After graduating from law school and passing the Virginia bar, Rudy was hired by DeLay, after being recommended by Rohrabacher. While working for Rohrabacher, Rudy met his future wife, Lisa, who was also employed as a staffer in Rohrabacher's office. The couple would marry in August 1995.

Rudy then went on to work for more than five years in Tom DeLay's office. During his time working for DeLay, Rudy served as press secretary, policy director, and finally deputy chief of staff, while DeLay progressed within the Republican Congressional leadership from congressman to Majority Whip to Majority Leader. DeLay lauded Rudy in a congressional floor speech on December 15, 2000, just before Rudy left to work with Abramoff at Greenberg Traurig, a Washington, D.C. lobbying firm.

Rudy's March 2006 guilty plea on a charge of conspiracy covered payments from Abramoff clients and associates to Liberty Consulting, a political firm founded by Rudy's wife, Lisa. In October 2005, the Washington Post reported that Rudy, while on DeLay's staff, helped scuttle a bill opposed by eLottery Inc., an Abramoff client, and that Abramoff had eLottery pay Toward Tradition to hire Liberty Consulting," Susan Schmidt and James Grimaldi, reported in the November 26, 2005, Washington Post.

On November 17, 2006, the Virginia State Bar Disciplinary Board revoked Rudy's license to practice law.
