= Pat Dollard =

American documentary filmmaker

- Occupation: Documentary filmmaker

Patrick Dollard is an American documentary filmmaker. In the 1990s he was a Hollywood talent agent, manager, and producer most known for helping to build the career of Oscar-winning director Steven Soderbergh. Dollard has been known as a Hollywood conservative since the mid-1990s, and promotes himself as a conservative filmmaker, blogger, and pundit. Dollard has been alleged to be an alcoholic and drug abuser who has struggled to overcome his addictions, as claimed in an article by Evan Wright in Vanity Fair and in Wright's subsequent book Hella Nation.

Dollard hosted a web-only radio show called "The Jihadi Killer Hour" at Blog Talk Radio from May 2008 to August 2010. His guests included Hollywood, Interrupted author Mark Ebner, Matt Drudge's former partner Andrew Breitbart (founder of websites Breitbart and Big Hollywood), Media Malpractice: How Obama Won The Election director John Ziegler, Jihad Watch's Robert Spencer, independent war correspondent Michael Yon, conservative pundit and former "Politically Incorrect" staff writer Evan Sayet, Brothers At War director Jake Rademacher, African-American comedian Zo, Harlem Pastor James Manning, and conservative comedian Steven Crowder.

== Iraq War project ==
While still running a management company, representing Soderbergh and helping to service Soderbergh and George Clooney's production company at Warner Brothers' (Section 8 Films), in 2004 Dollard decided to do a side project for a few weeks in three combat zones in Iraq: Fallujah, The Triangle of Death, and Ramadi. The project began as a 2–4 week rapid-production documentary project, but eventually grew to include a 7-month stay in Iraq with a Marine unit and over 200 hours of footage. The resulting documentary, Young Americans, has been released in segments on the Internet and clips have been shown on television. Dollard and footage from Young Americans are featured in a new French documentary for Canal Plus called Hollywood and Politics, directed by David Carr Brown.

== Political views ==
Dollard has argued that there were more important reasons for the Iraq war than weapons of mass destruction: "The root causes of terrorism are the lack of capitalism, the lack of democracy, and the lack of modern education." Dollard contends that the Iraq War has successfully removed some of the barriers to the causes of terrorism in the Middle East.

On April 2, 2014, after the 2009 Fort Hood shooting, Dollard caused controversy by tweeting:

If there is even one more act of Muslim terrorism, it is then time for Americans to start slaughtering Muslims in the streets, all of them.

Dollard did not apologize for the tweet but suggested it was not to be taken seriously.

Dollard has criticised the "liberal-dominated media" in America who have opposed the Iraq War.
