= Crossroads School (Santa Monica, California) =

Crossroads School for Arts and Sciences

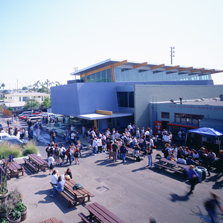

Location
- 1714 21st Street; Santa Monica, California; United States; 34°01′28″N 118°28′26″W

Information
- Type: Private, college preparatory
- Opened: 1971
- Founder: Paul Cummins, Rhoda Makoff
- Head of school: Mariama Richards
- Grades: K–12
- Gender: Co-educational
- Enrollment: 1,207
- Colors: Blue and Red
- Athletics conference: CIF Southern Section; Gold Coast League
- Nickname: Roadrunners
- Publication: Kollektiv (academic journal), Dark as Day (literary arts journal)
- Newspaper: Crossfire
- Yearbook: Crossroads Yearbook
- Tuition: $46,694 (lower school) $55,489 (upper school)
- Website: xrds.org

Crossroads School for Arts & Sciences is a K-12 independent, progressive, coeducational day-school with two campuses, located a few blocks apart, in Santa Monica, California.

== History ==
Founded in 1971 by Paul Cummins and Rhoda Makoff, Crossroads School for Arts & Sciences opened its doors in the fall of 1971, in three rented rooms in a Baptist church, with an initial enrollment of just over 30 students in seventh and eighth grades. Over the decades, it moved and expanded, now serving around 1,200 students in kindergarten through high school.

== Campus facilities ==
Crossroads School operates two campuses and a performing arts center. The Norton Campus houses the Crossroads Elementary School, the Joanie Martin Community Room, and the K-12 Sports Center for all grade levels of interscholastic athletic teams. The Norton Campus was endowed by Crossroads parent and entrepreneur Peter Norton.

The 21st Street Campus is located a few blocks away from the Norton Campus and houses the middle and upper schools, as well as administrative offices; a humanities building; a science education and research facility; the Sam Francis Gallery, named in honor of Crossroads parent and artist Sam Francis; the Stephen Morgan Middle School, named in honor a former Crossroads teacher who died from AIDS; and the Paul Cummins Library, named in honor of Crossroads' co-founder. On 22nd Street, the Bezdek Center for the Performing Arts hosts Crossroads' musical and theatrical events and productions.

== Demographics ==
Crossroads students represent 107 zip codes. 56% of students and 46% of faculty identify as people of color. One in four students receive some form of financial aid through the School’s Affordability Program. In 1991, Crossroads parent and A&M Records co-founder and musician Herb Alpert and his foundation established the Herb Alpert Endowment to provide merit and need-based student scholarships and to enhance student body diversity.

== Athletics ==
Crossroads Upper School participates in a full range of interscholastic athletics as a member of the CIF Southern Section. Teams include baseball, softball, basketball, soccer, tennis, volleyball, beach volleyball, cross country, track, golf, and swimming.

== In the media ==
The 2004 book Hollywood, Interrupted, by Andrew Breitbart and Mark Ebner, dedicated a large section to Crossroads; it depicted the school (and the celebrities who send their children there) in a negative light, focusing mainly on a handful of high-profile parents and "drug problems" stemming from the 1980s. The school was also featured in a May 2005 issue of Vanity Fair; like Breitbart's book, it also focused on the school's celebrity clientele.

In his 2023 biography, Elon Musk alleges that Crossroads teaches "full-on communism," and blames his daughter's transition, alleged communist ideology, and decision to cut him out of her life on Crossroads.

On the Dec. 11, 2025 episode of Amy Poehler’s podcast “Good Hang,” alumna Maya Rudolph said of Crossroads, “It was such a f…g great, creative, cool school. It was so punk and weird and artistic.”

On the Sept. 19, 2024 episode of the podcast “WTF with Marc Maron,” alumnus Jason Ritter said of Crossroads, “I really loved it. … There’s a class where we passed around a stick and talked about our feelings. It forced 14- and 15-year-olds to be like, ‘I guess this is what’s going on inside my heart and brain.’”

On the Mar. 24, 2025 episode of the podcast “The Diary of a CEO,” alumnus Evan Spiegel said about his introduction of the practice of Council at Snap, Inc., “Council is something that I stole from the school that I went to growing up called Crossroads School for Arts & Sciences, which is quite a unique school…(Council) really creates an opportunity for people to listen to one another because you're taking turns going around the circle, but you get to know people in a very very different way and I saw how powerful it was…”

== Notable alumni ==
- J. A. Adande, sports journalist
- Maude Apatow, actress
- Sean Astin, actor, director and producer
- Henry Baum, writer, blogger and musician
- Michael Bay, film director and producer
- Z Berg, musician
- Jack Black, actor, comedian, and musician
- Max Brooks, actor and author
- Gary Coleman, actor, comedian, and writer
- Austin Croshere, NBA basketball player and TV broadcaster
- Baron Davis, NBA basketball player and TV commentator
- Emily Deschanel, actress, director and producer
- Zooey Deschanel, actress, model, and singer-songwriter
- Alden Ehrenreich, actor
- Jessie Ennis, actress
- Maya Erskine, actress and TV writer
- Zack Fleishman, professional tennis player
- Robert Francis, musician
- Nicole Gibbs, professional tennis player
- Lauren Greenfield, artist, photographer, and filmmaker
- Petra Haden, musician and singer
- Rachel Haden, musician
- Tanya Haden, artist, cellist, and singer,
- Charlie Hall, actor
- Simon Helberg, actor, comedian and musician
- Jonah Hill, actor, director, producer, screenwriter, and comedian
- Oliver Hudson, actor
- Kate Hudson, actress, author, and fashion entrepreneur
- Bronny James, basketball player
- Brody Jenner, television personality, disc jockey and model
- Jenni Konner, television writer, producer and director
- Alex Kurtzman, film and television writer, producer, and director
- Alexandra Kyle, actress
- Amadéus Leopold, music artist
- Zosia Mamet, actress and musician
- Milo Manheim, actor
- Shareef O'Neal, basketball player
- Michael Ojo, basketball player
- Roberto Orci, film and television writer and producer
- Gwyneth Paltrow, actress, businesswoman and author
- Amy Pascal, business executive and film producer
- Austin Peralta, jazz musician
- Whitney Port, reality television personality and fashion designer
- Spencer Pratt, reality television personality and former candidate for LA mayor
- Jack Quaid, actor
- Jason Ritter, actor and producer
- Maya Rudolph, actress, comedian, singer, and voice actress
- Tamir Saban (born 1999), American-Israeli basketball player
- Blake Schwarzenbach, musician
- Evan Spiegel, businessman, co-founder of Snapchat
- Dayna Tortorici, writer
- Liv Tyler, actress and former model
- Andrew von Oeyen, classical musician
- Gillian Welch, musician
- Vivian Wilson, daughter of Elon Musk
- Jessica Yellin, journalist
- Harley Viera-Newton, model and DJ
