= Hand of Hope =

Photo of child in fetal surgery

- Samuel Armas's arm reaching out of the uterus of his mother Julie Armas. Doctor's hands are those of Dr. Joseph Bruner.
- Artist: Michael Clancy
- Completion date: 19 August 1999
- Medium: Photography
- Subject: Samuel Armas
- Location: Nashville, Tennessee, U.S.

Hand of Hope is a 1999 medical photograph taken by Michael Clancy during open fetal surgery, showing the hand of the fetus extending from the incision in the mother's uterus and seeming to grasp a surgeon's finger. Clancy was documenting a procedure being developed at Vanderbilt University to treat spina bifida. The photograph was taken on 19 August and the baby (Samuel Alexander Armas) was safely delivered on 2 December.

== Story behind the photograph ==
The photograph was taken during a medical procedure to fix the spina bifida lesion of a 21-week-old fetus. The operation was performed by a surgical team at Vanderbilt University in Nashville. The team, Dr. Joseph Bruner and Dr. Noel Tulipan, had been developing a technique for correcting certain fetal problems in mid-pregnancy. Their procedure involved temporarily opening the uterus, draining the amniotic fluid, partially extracting and performing surgery on the tiny fetus, and then restoring the fetus to the uterus back inside the mother.

=== Samuel Armas ===
Alex and Julie Armas first discovered that their baby had spina bifida during an ultrasound 14 weeks after conception. The Armases came across the Vanderbilt procedure while researching their options online.

This was the surgical team's 54th operation on a fetus still in the uterus. During the operation, Dr. Joseph Bruner opened the womb and Dr. Tulipan successfully alleviated the effects of the opening in Samuel's spine caused by the spina bifida.

== Around the world ==
Pictures from the surgery were printed in a number of newspapers in the U.S. and around the world, including USA Today. As a result of the operation, Armas was healthy when he was delivered on December 2, 1999.

On September 25, 2003, the boy's parents, Alex and Julie, testified before the U.S. Senate Subcommittee on Science, Technology, and Space about the photograph and their experience with in-utero surgery.

Today, Samuel is nearly four years old and has not had to endure the surgeries that are common for most children with spina bifida. He's walking with leg braces, is cognitively normal, and loves looking for bugs.

— Alex Armas

== Matt Drudge ==
In 1999, Matt Drudge hosted a Saturday night television show called Drudge on the Fox News Channel. In Nov 1999 he attempted to show Samuel's picture on his Fox News program, but was not allowed to by the network. This led to his leaving of the show for what he claimed to be the network's censorship. Fox News directors did not want to use the picture because they feared Drudge would use it to support an anti-abortion argument. They viewed this to be misleading because the tabloid photo dealt not with abortion, but with an emergency operation on the baby for spina bifida.

== Controversy ==
The picture attracted a lot of attention when it was released, as it was used by opponents of abortion who asserted that the baby reached through the womb and grabbed the doctor's hand, thus showing signs of life at the 21st week of pregnancy. Indeed, the photograph and many of the texts which often accompany it seem to support this view, including the account of the photographer Michael Clancy:

As a doctor asked me what speed of film I was using, out of the corner of my eye I saw the uterus shake, but no one's hands were near it. It was shaking from within. Suddenly, an entire arm thrust out of the opening, then pulled back until just a little hand was showing. The doctor reached over and lifted the hand, which reacted and squeezed the doctor's finger. As if testing for strength, the doctor shook the tiny fist. Samuel held firm. I took the picture! Wow!

It happened so fast that the nurse standing next to me asked, "What happened?"

"The child reached out," I said.

"Oh. They do that all the time," she responded.

However, the surgeon later stated that Samuel and his mother Julie were under anesthesia and could not move.

"The baby did not reach out," Dr Bruner said. "The baby was anesthetized. The baby was not aware of what was going on."

The surgeon who operated on the mother stated that rather than the fetus' hand clutching on to his finger, he was simply pushing the fetus' arm that had suddenly jolted out of the womb back into the womb in order to finish the surgery.

== Cultural references ==
The event has been referred to in three TV series: the drama House, in the episode "Fetal Position", the sitcom Scrubs, in the episode "My Road to Nowhere", and in the political drama TV series The Good Wife, in the episode "Heart" in which the photograph was shown.

== Similar image ==
An image of the hand of a newborn grasping the finger of the doctor during a C-section operation became a viral hit in January 2013.
