= List of Keith Olbermann's special comments =

Keith Olbermann occasionally delivered "special comments", commentaries usually several minutes long and often directed at a political figure, on his 2003-2011 MSNBC news show, Countdown with Keith Olbermann. The first commentary specifically designated as a special comment was delivered on August 30, 2006. He continued this practice when Countdown transferred to Current TV for the 2011-2012 season.

Olbermann originated and wrote his special comments himself, which he described as a two-day process that began with "[getting] pissed off" and involved a number of rewrites and rehearsals before the show aired. Olbermann delivered a total of 57 Special Comments on MSNBC's Countdown. The special comments almost always took the form of criticism of the conservatives, including the Bush administration, Newt Gingrich or Tom DeLay.

He also criticized the Democratic Party and President Barack Obama when they seemed to be catering to the whims of the right wing. His criticism of Hillary Clinton's response to the comments of Geraldine Ferraro about Barack Obama and the comments aftermath was the first time a special comment was "directed exclusively at a Democrat."

Some of his most vehement Special Comments were about the need for universal health care in the United States. He appealed to viewers several times to support the National Association of Free Clinics. On October 6, 2009, Olbermann delivered a one-hour Special Comment devoted entirely to the need for health care reform, detailing history, statistics, and a personal account about what he witnessed while caring for his ailing father.

Olbermann's special comments generated much attention and controversy, especially on the Internet. They have been viewed hundreds of thousands of times on YouTube. The day after the first special comment, Olbermann's name became the #4 search term on Technorati and the Amazon.com ranking of his book Worst Person in the World jumped from #98 to #19. On at least two instances, excerpts from special comments were entered into the Congressional Record, including a speech by West Virginia Representative Nick Rahall on the House floor.

A book compiling Olbermann's Special Comments, Truth and Consequences: Special Comments on the Bush Administration's War on American Values, was released on December 26, 2007, containing all the Special Comments that aired on or before September 4, 2007, including the one on Hurricane Katrina.

Countdown ended in 2012 and Olbermann moved into sports broadcasting for a time. In 2016, he launched The Resistance with Keith Olbermann, a political commentary web series for GQ magazine built around discussions similar to the earlier "special comments."

== Origins and parodies ==
Before Olbermann started designating his commentaries "special comments," he delivered a commentary on what he characterized as the Bush administration's incompetence in handling the Hurricane Katrina relief effort on September 5, 2005. The commentary was widely shared on the Internet and prompted Rolling Stone to name Olbermann a "truth teller" in its 2005 Men of the Year issue.

On December 18, 2006, MSNBC first aired a show dedicated entirely to Olbermann's special comments. The show, which aired during Countdown's normal time slot during Countdown's holiday hiatus featured four Special Comments: "This hole in the ground", "Feeling morally, intellectually confused?", "A special comment about lying", and "Where are the checks, balances?" Olbermann revealed during this show that his first special comment, "Feeling morally, intellectually confused?" was written on the back of a travel itinerary while waiting for a flight in Los Angeles. Later, on August 31, 2007, Olbermann spoofed himself and the special comments with a guest appearance on The Soup. In it, he and host Joel McHale berated Britney Spears and Lindsay Lohan for their misbehavior, going so far as to put up a photo of Anna Nicole Smith as an example of what could happen to them if they don't change their ways. Olbermann similarly parodied the concept (and his own delivery) during the Keeping Tabs segment of the December 7, 2007 edition of Countdown with a "Special Come On." It was directed at FOX Network executives about the possibility of an Arrested Development movie, and extolled the virtues of the show both in terms of quality and marketability.

In 2008, Saturday Night Live guest host Ben Affleck portrayed Olbermann in a parody of Countdown, which featured a mock special comment against the co-op board that would not allow Olbermann to keep his cat, satirically named "Miss Precious Perfect", in an apartment he shares with his mother. Ironically, Olbermann is allergic to cats.

In January 2010, The Daily Show also parodied the special comment format, with host Jon Stewart criticising Olbermann for 'name-calling' in his attacks on Scott Brown.

The October 2010 issue of Mad Magazine included "The Wizard of O," a contemporary parody of The Wizard of Oz written by Desmond Devlin and illustrated by Tom Richmond, in which the film's roles were filled by Barack Obama, Sarah Palin and dozens of cable news pundits. As the Scarecrow, Bill O'Reilly squabbles with his rival Olbermann as the Tin Man, including the taunt, "'Special' Comment? Give me a break! How special can they be, when you do one every night?"

== List of special comments ==
The links in this table are to transcripts or videos of the special comments. Special comment titles and summaries are those on the MSNBC website; Olbermann does not mention them on air.

#	Date	Title
1	August 30, 2006	Feeling morally, intellectually confused?
A response to a speech by Donald Rumsfeld in which Rumsfeld characterized those who disagreed with the Iraq War as "morally or intellectually confused." Olbermann compares Rumsfeld's certitude to that of Neville Chamberlain's government.
2	September 5, 2006	'Have you no sense of decency, sir?'
A response to a presidential press conference in which then-President George W. Bush quoted a purported letter by Osama bin Laden that mentioned "a media campaign to create a wedge between the American people and their government," which Olbermann alleges was an attempt to link the media to terrorists.
3	September 11, 2006	This hole in the ground
From Ground Zero, a comment on the fifth anniversary of the September 11, 2001 attacks and the slowness to rebuild on Ground Zero. Olbermann goes on to accuse the Bush administration of failing to build on the unity following 9/11 and implies that the Bush administration has committed an "impeachable offense."
4	September 18, 2006	Bush owes us an apology
A reaction to a Presidential Rose Garden address.
5	September 25, 2006	A textbook definition of cowardice
A response to Bill Clinton's Fox News interview.
6	October 5, 2006	A special comment about lying
The difference between terrorists and critics.
7	October 18, 2006	'Beginning of the end of America'
The Military Commissions Act and its effect on habeas corpus.
8	October 23, 2006	Advertising terrorism
Alleged fearmongering by the Republican Party.
9	November 1, 2006	Bush owes troops apology
In wake of John Kerry's misstated witticism and apology, Olbermann asserts that President Bush is stupid, dishonest, and that Bush owes U.S. troops an apology.
10	November 6, 2006	Where are the checks, balances?
Accusation that President Bush has been "making it up" for too long, and the people have let him.
11	November 20, 2006	Lessons from Vietnam
Response to President Bush's comparison of Vietnam and Iraq.
12	November 30, 2006	Free speech, failed speakers, and the delusion of grandeur
Regarding former Speaker of the House Newt Gingrich's comments regarding free speech protections.
13	January 2, 2007	Special comment about 'Sacrifice'
Reaction to President Bush's plan to send more American troops to Iraq, despite public opinion and the Iraq Study Group's recommendations.
14	January 11, 2007	Bush's legacy: The president who cried wolf
Reaction to President Bush's announcement that he will send more troops to Iraq.
15	January 30, 2007	Bush shoots for 'Jaws,' delivers 'Jaws 2'
Regarding evidence of President Bush's State of the Union claims about having stopped four terror plots.
16	February 26, 2007	Condi goes too far
Regarding comparison of Saddam Hussein to Adolf Hitler by then-Secretary of State Condoleezza Rice.
17	March 26, 2007	DeLay's DeLusions
Regarding comparison of liberals to Adolf Hitler by Tom DeLay.
18	April 25, 2007	Republicans equal life; Democrats equal death?
Accuses Rudy Giuliani of exploiting fear for power and personal gain.
19	May 23, 2007	The entire government has failed us on Iraq
Reaction to "compromise" between Democratic Party leaders and the Bush administration on Iraq War funding.
20	July 3, 2007	Bush, Cheney should resign
Reaction to Bush's commuting of the sentence of Scooter Libby, followed by a call for President Bush and Vice President Cheney to resign.
21	July 12, 2007	All hail the prophetic gut!
Reaction to Secretary of Homeland Security Michael Chertoff's remarks regarding "gut feelings" of possible terrorist attacks.
22	July 19, 2007	Go to Iraq and fight, Mr. President
Response to a leaked Defense Department memo blaming Hillary Clinton and war dissension for failures in Iraq.
23	September 4, 2007	Bush just playing us with 'troop withdrawal'
Reaction to statements made by President Bush on a surprise trip to Iraq earlier in the day in light of his previous comments in Robert Draper's book Dead Certain.
24	September 20, 2007	Olbermann to Bush: ‘Your hypocrisy is so vast’
Reaction to a September 20 press conference. Asserts that President Bush was the one who interjected Gen. David Petraeus into the political dialogue in the first place.
25	November 5, 2007	On waterboarding and torture
A reaction to comments by President Bush and Michael Mukasey responding to allegations of waterboarding by the Bush administration. Accuses the Bush administration of conducting a "criminal conspiracy" to protect itself from prosecution for torture.
26	December 6, 2007	Bush: Pathological liar or idiot-in-chief?
Reaction to President Bush's past statements toward the nuclear weapons capabilities of Iran compared to the National Intelligence Estimate issued on December 3, 2007.
27	January 31, 2008	Bush put telecoms ahead of citizens
Reaction to President Bush's demands for a law which would clear phone giants from responsibility in lawsuits involving "national security" spying.
28	February 14, 2008	A veto of the FISA bill endangers Americans
Reaction to President Bush's demands for telecom immunity and Republican congressmen staging a walk-out.
29	March 12, 2008	Clinton's tepid response to Ferraro is shameful
Reaction to comments of Geraldine Ferraro and the ensuing response of the Clinton campaign and Senator Clinton.
30	May 14, 2008	Mr. President, the war isn’t about you — or golf
Olbermann blasts President Bush for claiming to have given up golf in order to show support for the Iraq troops.
31	May 19, 2008	Countdown clarifies ‘Special Comment’
Countdown clarifies the Special Comment of May 14, 2008.
32	May 23, 2008	Clinton, you invoked a political nightmare
Keith Olbermann reviews how many times Hillary Clinton has referenced Robert F. Kennedy in her campaign – and how the most recent mention of him and his assassination was inexcusable.
33	June 12, 2008	McCain should know better
Keith Olbermann takes a look at the context of John McCain's "not too important" comment regarding the urgency of bringing American troops home from the Iraq war.
34	June 30, 2008	Obama's FISA opportunity
Keith Olbermann discusses Senator Barack Obama's second chance to vote on the FISA bill and still show voters that he can stand on principle through the advantage of a loophole within the bill.
35	August 18, 2008	Senator, Grow Up!
Keith Olbermann explains how John McCain and company repeatedly politicize the issues they address, especially the Iraq war, and blame the media for every hardship their campaign faces.
36	September 10, 2008	Republicans have hijacked 9/11
Keith Olbermann talks about the politicization of the terrorist attacks of September 11, 2001, especially by the Bush administration and the GOP, who use the event to terrify Americans into thinking the only safe option is to vote Republican "or this will happen again and you will die."
37	October 7, 2008	It's Palin doing the pallin'
Keith Olbermann points out in a Special Comment that while John McCain might want to use Sarah Palin to hit Barack Obama below the belt and accuse him of terrorist associations, he overlooked the unfortunate fact that "pallin' around with terrorists" is one area in which Palin has more experience.
38	October 14, 2008	McCain, suspend your campaign
In a brief Special Comment, Keith Olbermann expresses his disapproval of what he characterizes as the McCain-Palin campaign's "lynch-mob mentality" and what he alleges as their refusal to discourage surrogates and supporters from threatening Barack Obama at GOP campaign rallies.
39	October 20, 2008	Divisive politics is anti-American
Keith Olbermann lists examples of hateful, divisive politics from the right that actually do more to undermine America than the bogus accusations of anti-Americanism being leveled against Barack Obama.
40	November 10, 2008	Gay marriage is a question of love
Keith Olbermann disagrees with the passing of Proposition 8 in California and urges people to accept love between people of the same sex.
41	January 19, 2009	Bush guilty of torture
Keith Olbermann outlines why the Obama administration ought to prosecute Bush administration officials who endorsed the use of torture.
42	February 5, 2009	Cheney doing the work of terrorists
Keith Olbermann accuses former Vice President Dick Cheney of using made-up statistics and nonsensical reasoning in an effort to extend the Bush administration's reign of fear over Americans weeks after voters resoundingly rejected Cheney's un-American worldview.
43	March 19, 2009	Time to get tough on bankers
Olbermann expresses outrage at Wall Street over their continuing misuse of federal bailout money; he calls for the firing of bank executives and more stringent bank regulation.
44	April 16, 2009	Future of U.S. depends on torture accountability
Olbermann makes one more plea to President Obama to prosecute Bush administration officials who allowed the torture of prisoners to occur, to set an example for the future that America does not tolerate torture.
45	May 21, 2009	Cheney's speech false to fact and reason
Olbermann marvels at former Vice President Dick Cheney's defense of the Bush administration torture practices while avoiding taking any responsibility for them.
46	August 3, 2009	Legislators for sale
Olbermann criticizes members of Congress for acting more in the interests of donors in the healthcare industry rather than their constituents who favor health care reform.
47	August 10, 2009	'Death Panel' Palin dangerously irresponsible
Keith Olbermann decries former Alaska Gov. Sarah Palin's "death panel" invention in her criticism of President Barack Obama's health care agenda, pointing out that by peddling frightening lies to her mob of ill-informed followers she puts the safety and security of the nation at risk.
48	September 10, 2009	Wilson’s factual failure worse than his incivility
Keith Olbermann calls out South Carolina Rep. Joe Wilson not just for his shameful incivility in interrupting President Obama's health care speech before Congress but for being so glaringly, stupidly, publicly wrong.
49	October 7, 2009	Health Care Reform: The Fight Against Death
Program-length special comment about health care reform. Re-aired as a tribute to Theodore C. Olbermann on March 18, 2010.
50	November 30, 2009	Olbermann on Afghanistan: Get Out Now
Keith Olbermann argues that in the face of political and financial opportunism, not to mention outright lies about the war in Afghanistan, and the stark historical warning represented by Vietnam, President Obama should make the change he promised during his campaign and pull U.S. troops out of Afghanistan.
51	December 16, 2009	Ruined Senate bill unsupportable
Keith Olbermann stresses that he does not support the current "perversion of health care reform," urging Senate Democrats to drop the bill.
52	January 21, 2010	U.S. government for sale
Keith Olbermann envisions a future United States in which today's Supreme Court ruling permitting unbridled corporate campaign spending purchase all the power greed can afford.
53	February 15, 2010	Beware fear's racist temptation
Keith Olbermann explores the relationship between fear and racism and encourages Americans who are distressed about the nation's future to avoid political groups that appeal to their less noble inclinations.
54	February 24, 2010	An American cry for help
Keith Olbermann shares his personal experience with a real life 'death panel' situation and scorns the unfairness of health insurance in America.
55	March 22, 2010	GOP self-destruction imminent
Keith Olbermann advises Republicans that clinging to obsolete ideas and resorting to extremist rhetoric will only undermine the party's relevance and America will move on without them.
56	May 4, 2010	McCain's disturbing lack of faith in America
Keith Olbermann criticizes John McCain for opposing the application of American justice on Times Square terror plot suspect Faisal Shahzad as if America's system of justice is too weak for terrorists.
57	June 22, 2010	Olbermann on the self-destruction of McChrystal
Keith Olbermann argues that President Barack Obama shouldn't accept a resignation from Gen. Stanley McChrystal.
58	June 28, 2010	GOP takes no pity on the unemployed
Keith Olbermann argues that Republicans are wrong for not giving benefits to the jobless.
59	June 30, 2010	GOP introduces 'screw you' economics
Keith Olbermann talks about the Democrats' struggle against the GOP to reestablish the unemployment safety net.
60	July 21, 2010	The witch-hunt vs. Sherrod, and those who made it possible
Keith Olbermann compares the firing of Shirley Sherrod to the Dreyfus affair, criticizing the way the incident was handled in the media and the White House.
61	August 11, 2010	Gibbs frustration understandable but misguided
Keith Olbermann comments on White House Press Secretary Robert Gibbs criticism of the "professional left" for their criticisms of the Obama administration.
62	August 16, 2010	There is no 'Ground Zero mosque'
Keith Olbermann comments on the need to clarify the statements of both mainstream media outlets of, and opponents against, Park51 (formerly known as the Cordoba House) who dubbed the building as the "Ground Zero Mosque" (although the mosque area is designed as residing inside the larger community center which constitutes the entirety of the site. He also tries to clarify misconceptions regarding the center.
63	October 27, 2010	If the Tea Party wins, America loses
Less than a week before the 2010 midterm elections, Olbermann explains why voting for the Tea Party will mean a step backward for America.
64	November 15, 2010	False promise of ‘objectivity’ proves ‘truth’ superior to ‘fact’
Keith Olbermann discusses how the "false god" of objectivity in news reporting failed America in the lead up to the Iraq War, and points out that some of the most revered named in news were actually attacked in their times for being too partial in speaking truth to power.
65	December 7, 2010	Obama turned his back on his base
Keith Olbermann criticizes the president and his Council of Economic Advisers for not understanding that the rich aren't spending their money and the poor don't have any money to spend.
66	January 8, 2011	Violence and threats have no place in democracy
In the aftermath of the shooting of 19 people in an attempted assassination of Rep. Gabby Giffords, D-Ariz., Keith Olbermann reminds Americans that "violence, or the threat of violence, has no place in our democracy." Aired on a special Saturday edition of Countdown.
67	January 17, 2011	The nine days since Tucson
Nine days previously, Keith Olbermann asked every politician and commentator to renounce violent rhetoric and apologize for any use of it. Senator John McCain aside, Keith Olbermann thinks everybody else just got louder.
68	June 24, 2011	
Pending the decision about legalizing same-sex marriage in New York state, Keith speaks on the moral and political reasons for legalizing same-sex marriage in America, emphasizing his previous point that like heterosexual relationships, gay unions are based on love.
69	July 11, 2011	The Value of a Nation
Keith speaks about President Obama's proposed United States debt-ceiling crisis compromise with the Republicans to cut Social Security and Medicare. Keith describes these and other government support programs in simple terms of human beings looking out for one another. He explains why a social safety net is one of America's greatest accomplishments. Speaking directly to Pres. Obama, he reminds him of Jackie Robinson's statement "A life is not important except in the impact it has on other lives."
70	August 2, 2011	The four great hypocrisies of the debt deal
Keith speaks strongly about the resolution of the United States debt-ceiling crisis and the formation of the Supercongress committee. He concludes by reminding the audience that the American people are not powerless to change things. He exhorts them to "be organized and unified and hell-bent" in the spirit of the protests of the 1960s, stand up for their rights and take back the country from politicians and corporations.

=== Campaign comments ===
In October 2008, two weeks before the presidential election, Olbermann announced that he would briefly transform his special comments into a nightly feature, claiming that "If [the McCain campaign is] going to pile it on for the next two weeks, I'm going to have to throw it back." After numerous people observed that daily comments would render the term "special" meaningless, Olbermann christened the two weeks' comments as campaign comments. He also noted that the campaign comments would be less formal than his special comments, and "not necessarily just monologues, either. Sound Bites now acceptable."

#	Date	Title
1	October 21, 2008	Strike four for Palin on V.P. description
Keith Olbermann is irate at Sarah Palin's inability to answer correctly a third grader's question about the job of the Vice President of the United States — this being her fourth wrong answer since July.
2	October 22, 2008	McCain's clumsy hypocrisy
Keith Olbermann points out the hypocrisy in the McCain campaign's casting Sarah Palin as a hero of the working class while spending $150,000 on her image. The transparency of the ridiculous cynicism of the McCain campaign is further demonstrated by their awkward pandering to local baseball fans.
3	October 23, 2008	Joe the failed campaign gimmick
Keith Olbermann points out the futility of the McCain campaign harping on the Joe the Plumber theme when polls show it's not resonating with voters.
4	October 27, 2008	McCain: Speak up and lead!
Keith Olbermann says John McCain needs to speak out against those who would use the Ashley Todd mugging hoax as a means to re-open the racial divide in America.
5	October 28, 2008	Palin: Socialist, fraud
Keith Olbermann cites yet another example of the McCain campaign accusing Barack Obama of something of which they themselves are guilty. In this case, Sarah Palin is accusing Barack Obama of advocating socialism when she literally used that word to describe the collective wealth sharing in her home state of Alaska.
6	October 29, 2008	Who does Joe think he's fooling?
Keith Olbermann asks "Joe the Plumber" to give up playing the role of McCain-Palin campaign prop because he is either supplying false information or making a fool of himself.
7	October 30, 2008	Ayers a guest in McCain's glass house
Keith Olbermann points out that not only does John McCain have a closer relationship with Rashid Khalidi than Barack Obama does, that relationship means McCain had a connection to William Ayers as well.
8	November 3, 2008	If Obama had campaigned like McCain...
Keith Olbermann invites viewers to imagine how Barack Obama would be fairing in the election if Obama made the mistakes, contradictions, gaffes, Freudian slips, and hypocritical pronouncements that John McCain make throughout the campaign.
9	November 5, 2008	Obama's historic journey
Countdown recaps Barack Obama's historic win to become the 44th president of the United States and the first of African descent.

== Quick comments ==
Besides his special comments, Olbermann has, since January 11, 2010, also used "Quick Comments" to discuss news stories. It is usually reserved for topics which are not as impactful on American life as those which are covered in his Special Comments, but it is often used to bring attention to natural disaster crises around the country.

#	Date	Title
	January 11, 2010	
Criticism of anti-healthcare reform activism
	January 13, 2010	Robertson blames Haitians for earthquake
Criticism of Pat Robertson and Rush Limbaugh for post-earthquake criticism or blame of Haiti
	January 20, 2010	
Post-special election Criticism of Scott Brown
	February 4, 2010	McConnell should resign
Comment on Mitch McConnell's comments concerning
	February 4, 2010	Olbermann defends Countdown ratings
Comments on media rumors regarding Countdown's ratings fueled by LA Times post by a former Laura Bush press secretary
	February 5, 2010	Cali. Senate hopeful attacks opponent with baaa-d ad
Criticism of Carly Fiorina's Demon sheep ad against Tom Campbell
	February 5, 2010	Tancredo reveals tea party racism
	February 8, 2010	The sound of Palin's hand clapping
	February 8, 2010	Shame on Senator Shelby
Criticism of Richard Shelby's obstruction of healthcare reform
	February 9, 2010	Five-year-old sues insurance company
Comments on Kyler Van Nocker
	February 9, 2010	Humanitarian help at home
Attention to the "Share Your Sole" campaign for shoe donations to the Cheyenne River Indian Reservation following a winter storm
	February 10, 2010	Helping Americans in need
Praise to viewers who exceeded expectations by donating US$185,000 to winter storm victims at the Cheyenne River Reservation
	February 10, 2010	Mixing religion and politics
Criticism of Christian eschatology by Michele Bachmann (in United States-Israeli relations, Mark Cole (in Virginia anti-brain implants law)
	February 11, 2010	Keeping health care negotiations in the dark
Comment on Republican doublespeak concerning media coverage of congressional healthcare bill negotiations
	February 11, 2010	NRCC attacks a fellow Republican
Comments on NRCC ad unleashed against Parker Griffith
	February 12, 2010	Donations continue to aid the Cheyenne River Sioux Tribe
	February 12, 2010	Toyota's insider angle
Criticism of Toyota's hiring of two former National Highway Traffic Safety Administration employees who already helped Toyota dodge questions about brake safety
	February 16, 2010	Clinton ends Palin's mystique
	February 16, 2010	McCain overlooks Brennan's accomplishments
	February 17, 2010	Tea Party or White People's Party?
	February 17, 2010	Government for sale
Criticism of the impact of Citizens United ruling, with K&L Gates as an example
	February 18, 2010	
Criticism of the Tea Party's rhetoric, including an unidentified supporter who compared Patty Murray to the death of Jake Spoon from Lonesome Dove
5	February 18, 2010	Obama critics grasping at straws
	February 19, 2010	Pawlenty takes the low road
Criticism of Tim Pawlenty's comments comparing Elin Nordegren's estrangement from Tiger Woods to "big government"
	February 22, 2010	Bailout may cost McCain his seat
Criticism of John McCain's campaign "suspension" as a stunt to defend his Wall Street bailout vote
6	February 22, 2010	Texas may be quick to devolve, not secede
Criticism of the state of education in Texas
7	February 23, 2010	Olbermann on the diversity of msnbc
Response to a Tea Party criticism about diversity on the network
8	March 1, 2010	Olbermann: 'Life panels' invaluable for Americans
9	March 29, 2010	Lesson learned for an agitator
Comments on Carmen Mercer and the Minutemen Civil Defense Corps
	March 30, 2010	Fiorina clueless about Passover
Comments on Carly Fiorina campaign staff's mistake on the (un)leavening of bread for celebrants of Passover.
	March 31, 2010	Rubio will trade Keith Olbermann for immigrants
Criticism of Marco Rubio's comments on trading Olbermann, Sean Penn and Janeane Garofalo for more "patriotic" immigrants
	April 1, 2010	Keith addresses the sad truth
April Fool's Day comment in which Keith has "absolutely nothing to complain about," and instead shows a web video of a boy who cries when told by his father that he is not a "single lady" after singing the such-titled song by Beyoncé Knowles.
	April 2, 2010	Doctor refuses treatment to Obama voters
	April 6, 2010	McCain denies being a maverick
	April 7, 2010	Congressional candidate urges scare tactic
Criticism of Allen West's suggestion of scare tactics against congressional opponents
	April 8, 2010	La. congressman encourages mistreatment of patients
	April 12, 2010	Gov. Barbour lashes out over Confederate controversy
Review of Haley Barbour's minimization of the role of slavery in the Southern United States
	April 13, 2010	Tea Partier in denial
Review of psychological problems manifested in Springboro, Ohio Tea Party leader Sonny Thomas' Twitter comments and domestic conflicts
	May 3, 2010	Nashville flooded and forgotten
Request for 2010 Tennessee floods relief
	May 28, 2010	This isn't Obama's Katrina
Request for an intensification of anger to be channeled through the US President.
	June 2, 2010	Palin defends onshore drilling policy
Strong criticism of Sarah Palin's comments concerning onshore drilling, "Drill Baby Drill"

=== Tea Time ===
Beginning on April 20, 2010, Olbermann devoted many of his Quick Comment segments to the Tea Party movement, which he begins with the sound of a whistling kettle on the boil and the following:

No, that is not your water coming to a boil. That's our nightly checkup on the something-for-nothing crowd. 'It's Tea Time!'

#	Date	Title
1	April 20, 2010	Olbermann questions tea party makeup
Response to National Review's defense of Tea Party movement
	April 26, 2010	Tea Party disconnect from reality is profound
Highlighting a The Des Moines Register editorial written in response to the defense of the movement by The Washington Times.
	April 28, 2010	Don't call her a tea partier
	April 29, 2010	Helping tea partiers look crazy
	May 7, 2010	Who coined teabaggers?
Comment on both Melissa Clouthier's description of Obama's usage of "teabagger" to describe the Tea Party movement and the National Review's comment on the origin of the current political usage.
	May 13, 2010	NC Tea Party Crowd Thins Out
	May 18, 2010	Idaho tea party tackles constitution
Review of Idaho Tea Party's advocacy for repeal of the Seventeenth Amendment to the United States Constitution
	May 20, 2010	Tea Party money comes up low
	May 20, 2010	Apologies to Monkey gods
Review of Mark Williams' comments on monkey gods and Islam
	June 9, 2010	Did Nevada primary highlight Tea Party flaws?
Review of Sharron Angle's resume
	June 17, 2010	Dick Armey Tells Candidates Not To Go On MSNBC
	June 21, 2010	Palin's advice to the Gulf: Pray
	June 23, 2010	Rand Paul Flip-Flops On Campaign Promise
	June 25, 2010	Tea party loses one
	July 2, 2010	Tea party candidate targets immigrants utilities
	July 6, 2010	Comments on Sharron Angle's self-comparison to Abraham Lincoln
	July 7, 2010	SCOTUS wife seeking political donations
	July 15, 2010	Tea Party's Racism Revealed
	July 16, 2010	[Tea Party Delusions Of Grandeur]
	August 3, 2010	Tea party has narrow racial appeal
	August 5, 2010	Tea Party: Bike-sharing conspiracy?

== Special Comments On Current TV ==
June 15, 2011: Embarrassing Behavior over Weiner Roasting concerning the investigation of a sex scandal involving former Congressman Anthony Weiner.

June 23, 2011: A Clear Case for Same-Sex Marriage

August 2, 2011: Four Great Hypocrisies of the Debt Deal

September 2011 Baseball and the Anniversary of 9/11

October 2011 Calls for Oakland Mayor to quit.

March 2012 Fired by Current TV
