= Blumenthal v. Drudge =

- Court: United States District Court for the District of Columbia
- Full case name: Blumenthal v. Drudge
- Decided: April 12, 1998
- Citation: 992 F.Supp. 44

Holding
- Section 230 of the Communications Decency Act protects Internet service providers from liability for defamatory statements made by their users.

Case opinions
- Majority: Paul L. Friedman

Laws applied
- First Amendment to the United States Constitution, defamation, Section 230 of the Communications Decency Act

Blumenthal v. Drudge, 992 F.Supp. 44 (D.C.D.C., 1998), was a case of the United States District Court for the District of Columbia concerning online defamation and whether an Internet service provider has legal liability for defamatory comments made by its users. The ruling became an early precedent upholding the legal protections enjoyed by online businesses as provided by Section 230 of the Communications Decency Act, though it raised unresolved questions about the legal responsibilities of online journalists.

== Background ==
Matt Drudge was the author and operator of the Drudge Report, and early Internet news commentary and political gossip site, which at the time was hosted by America Online (AOL). In August 1997, Drudge reported that Sidney Blumenthal, an adviser to President Bill Clinton, had been accused of spousal abuse against his wife Jacqueline. Drudge first e-mailed the story to direct subscribers of the Drudge Report, and then posted it to the publication's AOL site. Drudge also scoffed at questions of whether his stories were accurate or if they should be expected to be so.

The following day, attorneys representing the Blumenthals filed a claim at the D.C. District Court against Drudge and AOL for libel, seeking $30 million in damages. Drudge immediately wrote a retraction and public apology to the Blumenthals which he fully published in the Drudge Report, but the plaintiffs proceeded with the libel suit regardless. Drudge and AOL requested summary judgment on the grounds that the district court did not have personal jurisdiction over the dispute, as Drudge operated his site from his home in California while AOL was incorporated in a different state. Drudge also argued that he should qualify for the First Amendment protections guaranteed to journalists.

== Opinion of the court ==
The district court first determined that it had personal jurisdiction over the dispute, per precedents such as Zippo Manufacturing Co. v. Zippo Dot Com, Inc. in which it was determined that the availability of a website in a court's territory satisfied minimum contacts for jurisdiction. Jurisdiction was also provided by the District of Columbia's long-arm statute because the injuries were suffered by the Blumenthals within the D.C. area.

Thus, the motion to dismiss the case against Drudge was denied. However, AOL was successful in its motion to dismiss, due to the protections granted against legal liability for Internet service providers by Section 230 of the Communications Decency Act. That protection was not available to Drudge as the author of the content, and the Blumenthals continued their suit against him. The Blumenthals and Drudge reached an out-of-court settlement in 2001. Sidney Blumenthal later claimed that he was forced to drop the lawsuit against Drudge because he could not afford the mounting legal fees.

In a later proceeding, the district court determined that Drudge qualified for the reporter's privilege under the First Amendment freedom of the press, and would not have to divulge his sources for the original story on the Blumenthals. This addressed the question of whether Drudge's online reporting and commentary made him a practicing journalist.

== Impact ==
While it was in progress, Blumenthal v. Drudge attracted significant media speculation over whether the court would take the opportunity to address new legal questions surrounding defamation and journalism on the Internet, which at the time were unsettled. There were also questions of whether online speech qualified for the highest level of First Amendment protection, as journalism and political speech did, and whether an online commentator who talks about news and politics could be considered a journalist. The ruling did not completely settle the question of whether established freedoms for professional print/television journalists would always apply online. Some commentators have also argued that while the ruling clarified AOL's protection against liability for Drudge's defamatory comments, it may have also gone beyond the intentions of Congress when passing Section 230.
