= Drudge Report =

American political website

- Homepage in 2017
- Website type: News site, blogging
- Available in: English
- Owner: Matt Drudge
- Creator: Matt Drudge
- Editors: Matt Drudge, Charles Hurt
- Website: drudgereport.com
- Advertising: Yes
- Registration: No
- Launched: 1995; 31 years ago Hollywood, California, United States
- Current status: Active

The Drudge Report (stylized in all caps as DRUDGE REPORT) is an American-based news aggregation website founded by Matt Drudge, and run with the help of Charles Hurt and Daniel Halper. The site consists mainly of links to news stories from other outlets about politics, entertainment, and current events; it also has links to many columnists. Prior to the 2020 United States presidential election, the site was a conservative publication, but its political leanings became liberal in mid-to-late 2019.

The Drudge Report originated in 1995 as a weekly subscriber-based email dispatch. It was the first news source to break the Clinton–Lewinsky scandal to the public, after Newsweek decided to "kill the story".

== Origins ==
The Drudge Report started in 1995 as a gossip column focusing on Hollywood and Washington, D.C. Matt Drudge began the email-based newsletter from an apartment in Hollywood, California, using his connections with industry and media insiders to break stories, sometimes before they hit the mainstream media. In its early days Drudge maintained the website from his home in Miami Beach, Florida, with help from assistants in story selection and headline writing. His first assistant was Andrew Breitbart. Breitbart, who described himself as "Matt Drudge's bitch", worked the afternoon shift at the Drudge Report, at the same time as running his own website, Breitbart News, which provided a conservative perspective for people in the Los Angeles entertainment industry. John Ziegler has said that Drudge blocked Breitbart from posting content critical of Barack Obama during the 2008 campaign for the US presidency.

In May 2010, Drudge added former Washington Times columnist Joseph Curl to the Drudge Report staff. In 2011, he added to the staff Charles Hurt, most recently the Washington bureau chief of the New York Post and a columnist for The Washington Times. Curl, who served as morning shift editor, left the site in 2014 and, with Drudge's blessing, in January 2015 launched his own aggregator Right Read, for The Washington Times.

Drudge, who began his website in 1997 as a supplement to his $10 per year e-mail newsletter, received national attention in 1996 when he broke the news that Jack Kemp would be Republican Bob Dole's running mate in the 1996 US presidential election. In 1998, Drudge made national waves when he broke the news that Newsweek magazine had information on an inappropriate relationship between "a White House intern" and President Bill Clinton—the Monica Lewinsky scandal—but was withholding publication. After Drudge's report came out, Newsweek published the story.

== Content ==
The Drudge Report site consists mainly of selected hyperlinks to news websites all over the world, each link carrying a headline written by Drudge or his editors. The linked stories are generally hosted on the external websites of mainstream media outlets. It occasionally includes stories written by Drudge himself, usually two or three paragraphs in length. They generally concern a story about to be published in a major magazine or newspaper. Drudge occasionally publishes Nielsen, Arbitron, and BookScan ratings, or early election exit polls which are otherwise not made available to the public.

In April 2009, the Associated Press announced that it would be examining the fair use doctrine, used by sites like Google and the Drudge Report to justify the use of AP content without payment.

On May 4, 2009, the US Attorney General's office issued a warning to employees in Massachusetts not to visit the Drudge Report and other sites because of malicious code contained in some of the advertising on the website. In March 2010, antivirus company Avast! warned that advertising at the Drudge Report, The New York Times, Yahoo, Google, MySpace and other sites carried malware that could infect computers. "The most compromised ad delivery platforms were Yield Manager and Fimserve, but a number of smaller ad systems, including Myspace, were also found to be delivering malware on a lesser scale," said Avast Virus Labs.

== Design ==
The site's design has seen few changes since its debut in 1997. Drudge has experimented with temporary, relatively minor design tweaks, including using all black-and-white pictures for a period in August 2017 and using colored text for holidays instead of the standard black throughout the site's existence; in all cases, the basic layout remained consistent throughout its existence. It remains entirely written in unscripted HTML, with a mostly monochromatic color scheme of black boldface monospaced font text on a plain white background. The Drudge Report has been described by Cheryl Woodard, co-founder of PC, Macworld, PC World and Publish magazines, as "a big, haphazard mishmash of links and photos" and by Dan Rahmel as "popular despite a plain appearance".

The Drudge Report website is simple and, according to Paul Armstrong of webwithoutwords.com, retro in feel. Jason Fried of Basecamp called it "one of the best designed sites on the web". It consists of a banner headline and a number of other selected headlines in three columns in monospaced font. Most link to an outside source, usually the online edition of a newspaper, which hosts the story. When no such source is available, either because the story is "developing", with little known details at the time, or is an exclusive scoop, a special page is created on the Drudge Report servers, which contains text and sometimes images.

Stories on the site are ascribed different levels of importance, which Matt Drudge rates at his editorial discretion. The Report almost always holds one major story above the masthead logo, usually just one sentence hyperlinked to the most important story of the day. Other stories surrounding the main headline can be found in the upper left-hand side of the page and link to more specific articles dealing with aspects of the headline story. The standard story, either the headline or links below the logo, is written in black.

The majority of stories are laid out in three columns beneath the masthead. At the bottom of each column are various links: newspapers and magazines in the left column, columnists in the middle column, and a collection of wire service links and miscellaneous links to archives, e-mail, site stats, and a box to submit anonymous tips at the right. "Weather Action," a static page of links to weather data, and "Quake Sheet," with earthquake monitoring, each have their own hosted page on the Drudge Report servers. The newest stories and those Drudge considers most important are in red, all under a single major headline in large, bold type. For significant breaking stories, especially if they are still emerging, Drudge places art of a flashing red light on the screen.

Although the site initially featured very few images, it is now usually illustrated with five or six photographs. Generally the images, like the linked headlines, are hotlinked from the servers of other news agencies.

== Political leanings ==
In 2009, Matt Drudge said that he is a conservative, but "more of a populist". Some had regarded the Drudge Report as conservative in tone, and it has been referred to in the media as "a conservative news aggregator". In 2008, Richard Siklos, an editor of Fortune magazine, called the Drudge Report a "conservative bullhorn". Peter Wallsten, writing in the Los Angeles Times, labeled Drudge a "well-known conservative warrior". Saul Hansell, writing in The New York Times, referred to him as a "conservative muckraker"; and Glenn Greenwald was quoted in New York magazine in August 2007 as calling him a "right-wing hack".

In 2008, Jesse Swick of The New Republic noted that the Drudge Report frequently linked to stories that cast doubt upon global warming. "[Drudge] loves a press release from Senator Inhofe almost as much as he loves taking pot shots at Al Gore ... It's like flashing tasty images of popcorn and sodas between frames at movie theaters, only much less subtle." Ben Shapiro wrote, "The American left can't restrict Internet usage or ban talk radio, so it de-legitimizes these news sources. Ripping alternative news sources as illegitimate is the left's only remaining option—it cannot compete with the right wing in the new media ... They call Matt Drudge a muckraker and a yellow journalist."

In 2015 and 2016, Drudge repeatedly featured pro-Trump headlines during the Republican Party presidential primaries, leading Salon and Politico to describe Drudge as "all in" for Trump. During the impeachment inquiry against Donald Trump of 2019, the Drudge Report began aggregating what CNN Business called "an overwhelming amount of negative news for the Trump White House". CNN speculated that this meant there had been a falling out. In 2019, Rasmussen Reports reported that Matt Drudge had sold the site and was no longer involved in its operations, which could also explain the change in editorial direction; however, that reporting was not confirmed.

By 2020, some prominent conservatives—including President Donald Trump—had concluded that the Drudge Report had abandoned its alleged conservative ideology, with Fox News primetime host Tucker Carlson stating, "Matt Drudge is now firmly a man of the progressive left." In 2020, Austrian social scientist Christian Fuchs of the University of Westminster described the Drudge Report as an alt-right website.

== Business model and viewership decline ==
Matt Drudge's business entity in Florida is a privately owned limited liability company called Digital, LLC. Drudge applied for and was granted a U.S. Trademark registration for the phrase "Drudge Report" on January 15, 2019, filed on May 15, 2018. The registration excludes the word "Report" from protection outside of the exact two-word phrase use. It is for "standard characters without claim to any particular font style, size, or color."

Revenue for the Drudge Report is driven by advertising that was managed for 20 years by Intermarkets, Inc. During the summer of 2019, after many years of being known for "changing nothing" about the website, Drudge advertising shifted to a new company by the name of Granite Cubed. The current ownership, strategy and outlook for the Drudge Report is held close as private information.

In October 2019, the Drudge Report began linking to articles which were increasingly critical of Trump, reportedly the result of Drudge himself becoming "exasperated" by the president. This coincided with a near 30% decrease in traffic metrics for the Drudge website in the last months of 2019—from a 90 day-ago ranking of #637 in global internet engagement as of July to #844 in December. After a Comscore data report showing a year over year decline of 38 percent from August 2019 to August 2020, President Trump tweeted, "Such an honor! Drudge is down 40% plus since he became Fake News. Most importantly, he's bleeding profusely, and is no longer "hot". But others are! Lost ALL Trumpers."

The site's readership briefly rebounded in March 2020 as the COVID-19 pandemic escalated. Still, it continued to decline to new record lows as the year went on.

== Influence ==
In 2006, Mark Halperin wrote that "Drudge's coverage affects the media's political coverage", effectively steering it towards what Halperin calls "the most salacious aspects of American politics". In The Way To Win, a book written by Halperin and John Harris, Drudge is called "the Walter Cronkite of his era". Democratic Party strategist Chris Lehane also said in 2006 "phones start ringing" whenever Drudge breaks a story, and Mark McKinnon, a former media advisor to George W. Bush, said that he checked the site 30–40 times per day.

Wallsten analyzed the data derived from a detailed content analysis of print, broadcast and blog discussions during the last five weeks of the 2008 campaign. Rather than the broad impact posited by professional political observers, Wallsten found that, even on issues where the site should be expected to have its largest impact, the stories highlighted on the Drudge Report exert a fairly inconsistent influence over what traditional media outlets chose to cover. Specifically, the time series analysis presented by Wallsten shows evidence of a "Drudge effect" on print and broadcast coverage for only five of the 10 political scandals that received the most attention on the Drudge Report between September 30 and November 3, 2008.

Other media news personalities have criticized Matt Drudge: Bill O'Reilly twice called Drudge a "threat to democracy" in response to Drudge disclosing his book sales figures, and Keith Olbermann referred to Drudge as "an idiot with a modem".

Drudge, along with his website, was labeled one of the "Top 10 anti-Barack Obama conservatives" by the US editor of The Daily Telegraph in February 2009.

In addition to its media influence, the Drudge Report has influenced design elements on other sites, some with opposing viewpoints and some which use the same format for listing news. A left-leaning parody site called Drudge Retort was founded in 1998 as "a send-up of Mr. Drudge's breathless style". According to online analytics data for April 2010 from the Newspaper Marketing Agency, the Drudge Report was then—now over ten years ago—the number one site referrer for all online UK commercial newspaper websites.

== Notable stories ==
=== Monica Lewinsky scandal ===
The Drudge Report initially attained prominence when it was the first to report what came to be known as the Lewinsky scandal. It published the story on January 17, 1998, showing that Newsweek had turned down the story.

=== Hillary Clinton presidential campaign ===
In October 2007, during the early months of the Democratic primary for the 2008 presidential campaign, the Drudge Report broke a story, "Queen of the Quarter: Hillary Crushes Obama in Surprise Fund-Raising Surge," and, "$27 Million, Sources Tell Drudge Report." The New York Times wrote, "Within minutes, Senator Hillary Rodham Clinton's fund-raising success was injected via Drudge into the day's political news on the Internet and cable television."

=== Swift Boat Veterans for Truth ===
During the 2004 US presidential campaign, the Swift Boat Veterans for Truth group made claims about John Kerry's war record, which were mentioned by Drudge and investigated by major newspapers and TV networks. The book Unfit for Command: Swiftboat Veterans Speak Out Against John Kerry became a best-seller in part due to its promotion in the Drudge Report.

=== Obama photo ===
Drudge published a photo of Barack Obama in Somali tribal dress on February 25, 2008, and reported that the photo had been sent to him by a Clinton campaign staffer. The publication of the photograph resulted in a brief war of words between the Clinton and Obama campaign organizations.

=== Prince Harry in Afghanistan ===
On February 28, 2008, Drudge published an article noting that Prince Harry was serving with his regiment in Afghanistan. Prince Harry was ten weeks into a front-line deployment in Afghanistan that was subject to a voluntary news blackout by the UK press. The blackout was designed to protect Prince Harry and the men serving with him from being specifically targeted by the Taliban. An Australian weekly women's magazine New Idea had broken the story in January, but it was not followed up at the time. The New Idea editors claimed ignorance of any news blackout. Then a German newspaper Berliner Kurier published a short piece on February 28, also before Drudge.

Drudge subsequently claimed the report as an exclusive. Chief of the General Staff Sir Richard Dannatt, professional head of the British Army, said: "I am very disappointed that foreign websites have decided to run this story without consulting us". The Prince's tour of duty was prematurely ended, since his unit might have been targeted by large-scale suicide attacks intended to kill the Prince.

=== U.S. Senate problems ===
On March 9, 2010, the Senate Sergeant-at-Arms claimed that the site was "responsible for the many viruses popping up throughout the Senate...Please avoid using [this] site until the Senate resolves this issue...The Senate has been swamped the last couples [sic] days with this issue." The Drudge Report countered stating that "it served more than 29 million pages Monday without an e-mail complaint about 'pop ups,' or the site serving 'viruses'."

=== White House Wire ===
After Donald Trump launched White House Wire, government-controlled news aggregator website, the visitors immediately compared it to Drudge Report due to similarities in their design. Hindustan Times said the website was entirely inspired by Drudge Report. Drudge Report reacted to the site's launch and called it "Trump's own Drudge Report". Matt Drudge subsequently threatened to sue Trump for $1 trillion for copyright infringement of the site's design.

== Controversial stories, errors and questions about sourcing ==
=== Exclusives ===
Research by the media magazine Brill's Content in 1998 cast doubt on the accuracy of the majority of the "exclusives" claimed by the Drudge Report. Of the 51 stories claimed as exclusives from January to September 1998, the magazine found that 31 (61%) were truly exclusive stories. Of those, 32% were untrue, 36% were accurate and the remaining 32% were of debatable accuracy.

=== Sidney Blumenthal lawsuit ===
In 1997, the Drudge Report reported that incoming White House assistant Sidney Blumenthal may have been perpetrating domestic violence. Drudge retracted the story the next day and apologized, saying that he was given bad information. Still, Blumenthal filed a $30 million libel lawsuit, Blumenthal v. Drudge, in the District of Columbia. After four years, Blumenthal dropped his lawsuit, saying that the suit had cost him tens of thousands of dollars in legal fees. He agreed to pay $2,500 to Drudge's Los Angeles attorney for travel costs, claiming that Drudge was "backed by unlimited funds from political supporters who use a tax-exempt foundation." The Individual Rights Foundation, led by conservative activist David Horowitz, paid Drudge's legal fees in the Blumenthal lawsuit. Judge Paul Friedman, a Bill Clinton appointee, noted in the judgment that Drudge "is not a reporter, a journalist, or a newsgatherer. He is, as he admits himself, simply a purveyor of gossip."

=== Alleged John Kerry intern scandal ===
During the 2004 presidential campaign, the Drudge Report ran a story in which general Wesley Clark claimed that the John Kerry campaign would implode over an intern affair. The Drudge Report reported that other news outlets were investigating the alleged affair, but removed it from the site shortly afterward when the other news outlets dropped their investigations.

=== Alleged Bill Clinton illegitimate child ===
In 1999, the Drudge Report announced that it had viewed a videotape which was the basis of a Star magazine and Hard Copy story. Under the headline, "Woman Names Bill Clinton Father Of Son In Shocking Video Confession", Drudge reported a videotaped "confession" by a former prostitute who claimed that her son was fathered by Bill Clinton. After a paternity test using a sample of Clinton's DNA found on the dress belonging to Monica Lewinsky, a Star source told Time magazine that "there was no match, not even close." Drudge reported these findings in 1999, but during the 2016 presidential election Drudge revived the story that the child, Danney Williams, then a 30-year-old man, really was Clinton's illegitimate son by twisting facts.

=== Alleged heckling of Republican senators by CNN reporter ===
On April 1, 2007, the Drudge Report cited an unnamed "official" source claiming that CNN reporter Michael Ware had "heckled" Republican senators McCain and Graham during a live press conference:

An official at the press conference called Ware's conduct "outrageous," saying, "here you have two United States Senators in Baghdad giving first-hand reports while Ware is laughing and mocking their comments. I've never witnessed such disrespect. This guy is an activist not a reporter."

— Matthew Drudge, Drudge Report

However, a video hosted by Rawstory showed that Ware did not make a sound nor ask any question during the press conference.

=== Oprah and Sarah Palin ===
On September 5, 2008, the Drudge Report reported that The Oprah Winfrey Show staffers were "sharply divided on the merits of booking Sarah Palin." Drudge said that he had obtained the information from an anonymous source. Winfrey responded in a written statement to news outlets by saying, "The item in today's Drudge Report is categorically untrue. There has been absolutely no discussion about having Sarah Palin on my show. At the beginning of this presidential campaign when I decided that I was going to take my first public stance in support of a candidate, I made the decision not to use my show as a platform for any of the candidates." Oprah Winfrey's public statement came after she had already endorsed Barack Obama for president on Larry King Live in 2007. Drudge was accused by some commentators of planting a false story for political ends.

=== Ashley Todd attack hoax ===
On October 23, 2008, the Drudge Report published an unconfirmed exclusive story regarding Ashley Todd, a 20-year-old employee of the College Republican National Committee (CRNC) and John McCain volunteer who had allegedly been attacked by a black man for having a McCain sticker on her car in Pittsburgh. The story was reported without a link but as "developing", with the headline "Shock: McCain Volunteer Attacked and Mutilated in Pittsburgh – 'B' carved into 20 yr old Woman's Face." The story set off a "storm of media attention" and was repeated by some conservative bloggers and radio talk-show hosts, all citing the Drudge Report as their source. It was also reported in newspapers and on television around the world. The story was confirmed to be a hoax perpetrated by Todd and—according to Talking Points Memo—spread to reporters by McCain's Pennsylvania communications director.

The Drudge Report printed a retraction, including links to the news stories detailing that the attack had been a hoax, and that Todd had performed a similar "attack" on herself while volunteering in a local Ron Paul grassroots group. She was later asked to leave the group because of the hoax.

=== Birther conspiracy theories ===
The Drudge Report included some articles intimating that U.S. president Barack Obama was not an American citizen.

=== Hillary Clinton's 2016 campaign ===
On August 8, 2016, the Drudge Report displayed a photo depicting two men helping Democratic nominee Hillary Clinton ascend a set of stairs during a campaign stop in South Carolina on February 27, 2016. Afterward, several Twitter accounts in support of Republican nominee Donald Trump used the photo with the hashtag #HillaryHealth. The use of the photo was criticized by several commentators for presenting a dated photograph out of context to mislead readers.

On October 3, 2016, the Drudge Report published a dubious claim that Bill Clinton had an illegitimate child named Danney Williams, an allegation that the site had reported as debunked in 1999 based on a Time magazine article.

On December 30, 2016, an article listed on the Drudge Report accused the United States federal government of attempting to bring down its website with a denial-of-service attack. Beginning roughly one week earlier, DDoS attacks had repeatedly taken the site offline for extended periods. Cybersecurity analysts speculated that the attack was on the scale of the 2016 Dyn cyberattack. They suggested that only a small number of groups would have the ability to take down a highly trafficked site for extended lengths of time.

The Drudge Report included articles about the debunked Pizzagate conspiracy theory, as well as conspiracy theories about the murder of Seth Rich.

=== Conspiracy theories about the 2017 Las Vegas shooting ===
In October 2017, Drudge Report included articles with conspiracy theories about the 2017 Las Vegas shooting.

=== Immigration ===
In October 2017, the Drudge Report shared a dubious Breitbart News story claiming that an illegal alien caused the October 2017 Northern California wildfires. The story was rebutted by the Sonoma County's sheriff department, which stated, "This is completely false, bad, wrong information that Breitbart started and is being put out into the public."

In June 2018, the Drudge Report displayed a headline and photo pairing that some perceived as a suggestion that migrant children who had been separated from their parents were violent criminals. The photo was actually that of a group of Syrian children holding toy guns.

== See also ==
- "Drudge Retort", a parody website
