= Drudge Manifesto =

- Author: Matt Drudge
- Language: English
- Publication date: 2000
- Publication place: United States

Drudge Manifesto is a 2000 non-fiction book written by Matt Drudge.
