= Danney Williams =

American man who claims to be the son of President Bill Clinton

- Born: Danney Lee Williams; December 7, 1985 (age 40); Little Rock, Arkansas

Danney Lee Williams Jr. (born December 7, 1985) is a man from Little Rock, Arkansas who claims to be the biological son of Bill Clinton, the former President of the United States. According to the Washington Post, blood tests ruled out Clinton as the father, while Snopes reported that the claim of parental heritage was "unproven" in 2021.

== Background ==
Williams was born in 1985 to Danney Williams Sr. and Bobbie Ann Williams.

The story came to notice in the late 1990s when reporting by Newsmax led celebrity tabloid magazine Star to commission a paternity test to prove whether Williams is actually Clinton's biological son. Time magazine cited Star on July 18, 1999 to say that there was no match.

The story was revived in 2016 before the 2016 presidential election and pushed by a number of media outlets including Newsmax, the Drudge Report, as well as WorldNetDaily, and the New York Daily News.

Due to some uncertainties with the original test by Star, Snopes concluded that the claim was unproven. The Washington Post stated that, while the test could not prove Clinton was the father, it did conclusively rule him out as the father.

On October 19, 2016, Williams' lawyers announced their intentions to file a paternity suit to prove that Clinton's DNA matched Williams'. Williams wrote to Monica Lewinsky asking for her dress in order to obtain a sample of Clinton's DNA. However, Lewinsky never replied to Williams. A partial analysis of Clinton's blood, and thus his DNA, was already part of the public record because of the Lewinsky affair investigation.
