= Hella Nation =

Book by Evan Wright

- Author: Evan Wright
- Language: English
- Genre: Essays, Sociology, Military
- Publisher: Putnam Adult
- Publication date: April 2, 2009
- Publication place: United States
- Media type: Hardcover
- Pages: 352
- ISBN: 0-399-15574-0

Hella Nation: Looking for Happy Meals in Kandahar, Rocking the Side Pipe, Wingnut's War against The Gap, and Other Adventures with the Totally Lost Tribes of America is a 2009 book written by journalist Evan Wright, who previously wrote Generation Kill.

Hella Nation mostly chronicles different subcultures across America he encountered while working for Rolling Stone and Vanity Fair magazines. It also includes a chapter profiling soldiers in the 101st Airborne Division who Wright accompanied in the early days of the war in Afghanistan. All but one of the essays were previously published as magazine pieces, but the versions published in the book have been greatly expanded.

== Content and themes ==
Hella Nation presents Wright's portraits of a variety of American subcultures and oddball personalities, including tree-dwelling ecoterrorists, Aryan Nation skinheads, Internet con artists, porn stars, the rock band Mötley Crüe and a former William Morris Agency talent agent during his darkest hours. One critic compared the collection to the Joan Didion book Slouching Towards Bethlehem.

The book includes an essay by Wright about his first experiences as a journalist while working as an adult film reviewer at Hustler magazine. Though many of the subjects covered in the book are disturbing, such as crime and pornography, Wright presents them as part "a comically macabre portrait of American life."

== Background ==
In the first chapter of Hella Nation Wright discusses his friendship with David Foster Wallace who wrote about Wright in one of his own essays titled "Big Red Son" included in Wallace's book Consider the Lobster.

Wright's approach to his subjects has been compared to that of Hunter S. Thompson and is sometimes labelled as Gonzo journalism, although Wright rejected the categorization.

Wright stated in an interview with the Columbia Journalism Review that he had an affinity for writing about outsiders, based on the experience of running away when he was a child and being sent to a home for troubled youth.

== Awards ==
Hella Nation includes an expanded version of an essay, "Pat Dollard's War on Hollywood" for which Wright received the 2008 National Magazine Award for profile writing.
