= Viper (actress) =

American actress

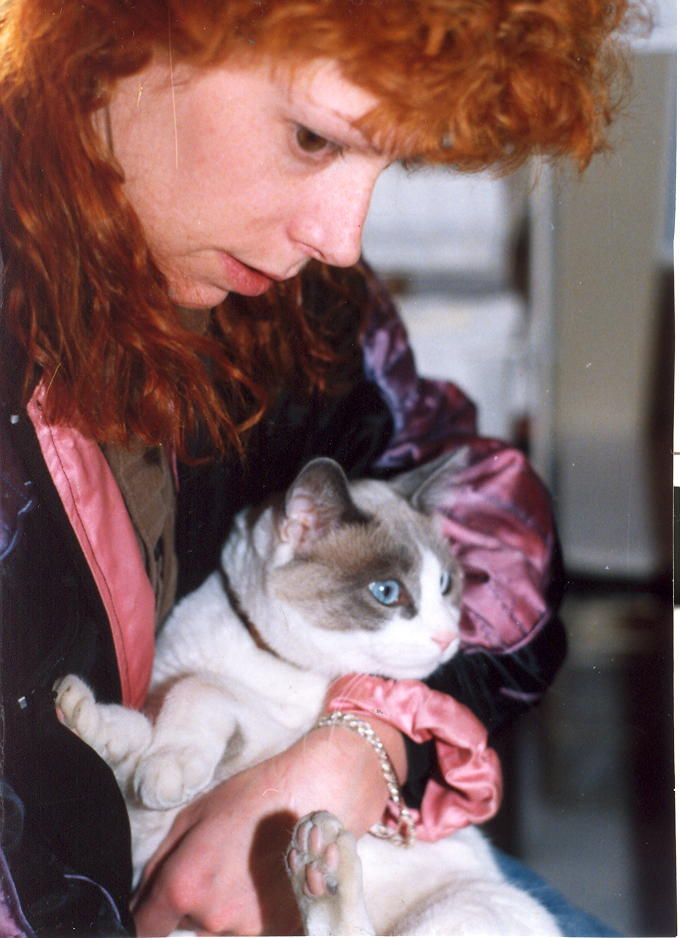
- In early 1989
- Born: Stephanie Patricia Green; September 12, 1959; Oak Ridge, Tennessee, U.S.
- Died: December 24, 2010 (aged 51); Portsmouth, New Hampshire, U.S.
- Other name: Stephanie Bishop
- Occupation: Pornographic actress
- Height: 5 ft 9 in (1.75 m)

Stephanie Patricia Green (September 12, 1959 – December 24, 2010), better known by her stage name Viper, was an American pornographic actress, known for a prominent full-body snake tattoo, for co-founding Fans of X-Rated Entertainment with William Margold, and for her disappearance in 1991.

== Early life ==
Stephanie Patricia Green was born on September 12, 1959, in Oak Ridge, Tennessee, but raised in rural New Hampshire. Green joined the United States Marine Corps, where she served at Camp Lejeune, rising to the rank of corporal. After six years, Green was expelled from the Corps for fraternizing with her superior officers, and worked a year in Baltimore as a prostitute and an entertainer at "The Block" nightclub. She got her trademark tattoo from tattoo artist and street gang member Harry Von Groff in Philadelphia, described as "...a snake poised to strike her left nipple, that morphs into a tiger composed of interlaced skulls across her belly, and finally reanimates as a snake snapping at her clitoris."

== Career ==
In 1986, Green moved to Los Angeles to enter the adult film industry. Soon thereafter she met William Margold, an influential pornographic actor, director, and agent. They began a romantic relationship and lived together for five years. Adopting the stage name of "Viper", she made a total of seventy hardcore pornography films, the first of which being White Trash, and the last being Erotic Heights. She won the 1990 AVN Award for Best Supporting Actress in Mystery of the Golden Lotus, playing a Nazi spy. She made a couple of mainstream appearances a role as a porn film director in the 1988 comedy Vice Academy, starring fellow adult film actress Ginger Lynn.

In an effort to get more adult film roles, Viper underwent breast enhancement surgery in August 1989. The breast implants she received took her from a 34A to 34DD. In May 1991, Viper abruptly disappeared. Her driver's license, social security card and birth certificate were found on a gravestone in Arkansas. Her boyfriend of five years, William Margold, never saw her again. In his Gear magazine article, journalist Mark Ebner recounts having spoken with her mother who reported her alive and well at that time.

== Death ==
Viper died on December 24, 2010, of lung cancer. In her obituary, it was stated that after she left Los Angeles, she returned to New Hampshire, where she worked as hair stylist and later as a phlebotomist.
