= Hollywood, Interrupted =

2004 book by Andrew Breitbart

- Cover of the 2004 edition
- Author: Andrew Breitbart, Mark Ebner
- Cover artist: Getty Images
- Language: English
- Subject: Celebrity
- Publisher: John Wiley & Sons
- Publication date: February 24, 2004
- Publication place: United States; Canada
- Media type: Print
- Pages: 416
- ISBN: 978-0-471-45051-1
- OCLC: 54774468
- Dewey Decimal: 791.4302/8/092279494 22
- LC Class: PN1993.5.U65 B678 2004

Hollywood, Interrupted: Insanity Chic in Babylon – The Case Against Celebrity is a book and website authored by Andrew Breitbart, with co-author Mark Ebner. The book was published in 2004 by John Wiley & Sons. The writing focuses primarily on what Breitbart and Ebner sees as the disconnected, self-indulgent nature of Hollywood culture. The book was on the New York Times Best Seller list, and was also a Los Angeles Times bestseller. The title references the 1999 film Girl, Interrupted.

== Contents ==
Hollywood, Interrupted takes a look at the culture of celebrity, discussing the mannerisms of celebrities such as Barbra Streisand, Winona Ryder, Robert Downey Jr., Eddie Murphy and Angelina Jolie. The work discusses some of the more scandalous of these and other celebrities, as well as their effects on society. Ebner writes about a woman who was employed by AOL, used their database to acquire private information about Hollywood celebrities, and then utilized this illicit information to later create a career for herself in the entertainment industry. Trey Parker, one of the creators of South Park, is interviewed in the work, and was quoted commenting on the vices of individuals in the entertainment industry, such as prostitution and drug addiction.

Part of the book is devoted to Crossroads School, a private high school in Santa Monica, California whose students largely come from families involved in the entertainment industry, and various scandals associated with the teenagers who attend that school.

The book also includes an analysis of the Church of Scientology and its effects on the culture in Hollywood, and has a chapter on Tom Cruise and John Travolta's relationship to Scientology.

== Reception ==
Hollywood Interrupted is a New York Times and Los Angeles Times bestseller. The book received a positive review in Britain's Telegraph, in an article entitled: "How we fell in love with 'insanity chic'". CNET News characterized the work as "... a humorous nonfiction account on runaway depravity in the entertainment industry."

An article in the Irish Independent was less positive. The article stated that though the book was witty and showed that the authors understood the material they were writing about, there was also a sense that they left out evidence in certain parts. A review in The Wall Street Journal stated that the work was: "... a terrific book, both snappy and snappish", however the reviewer went on to note that the work went into exhaustive detail to get across the point that: "People in Hollywood are nuts."
