= Sidney Blumenthal =

American political writer and operative (born 1948)

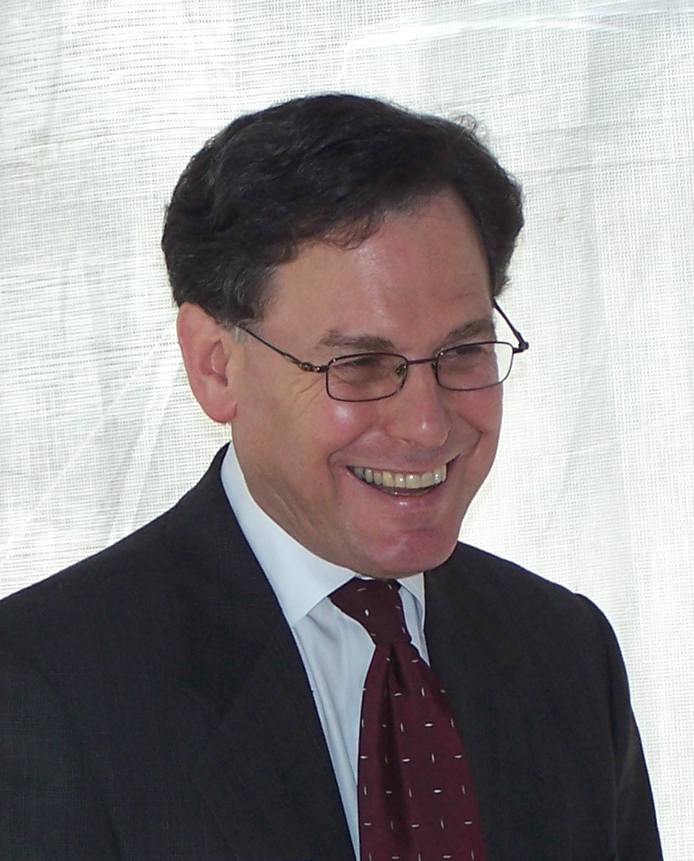
- Blumenthal in 2006

Senior Advisor to the President
- In office August 19, 1997 – January 20, 2001 Serving with Doug Sosnik, Joel Johnson
- President: Bill Clinton
- Preceded by: George Stephanopoulos
- Succeeded by: Karl Rove

Personal details
- Born: Sidney Stone Blumenthal; November 6, 1948 (age 78) Chicago, Illinois, U.S.
- Party: Democratic
- Spouse: Jacqueline Jordan (m. 1976)
- Children: 2, including Max
- Education: Brandeis University (BA)

Sidney Stone Blumenthal (born November 6, 1948) is an American journalist, political operative, and Abraham Lincoln scholar. A former aide to President Bill Clinton, he is a long-time confidant of Hillary Clinton, and was formerly employed by the Clinton Foundation. As a journalist, Blumenthal wrote about American politics and foreign policy. He is also the author of a multivolume biography of Lincoln, The Political Life of Abraham Lincoln. Three books of the planned five-volume series have already been published (A Self-Made Man, Wrestling With His Angel, and All the Powers of Earth), and subsequent volumes were planned for later.

Blumenthal has written for publications such as The Washington Post, Vanity Fair, and The New Yorker, for whom he served for a time as the magazine's Washington correspondent, and was, briefly, the Washington, D.C. bureau chief for Salon. He is a regular contributor to the openDemocracy website and is a regular columnist for The Guardian.

== Early life ==
Blumenthal was born in Chicago to Claire (née Stone) and Hyman V. Blumenthal. His father was Jewish, while his mother was Protestant Christian. He became involved in politics at age 12 as a courier for a local Democratic Party election precinct captain. Hearing John F. Kennedy reference The New York Times during a campaign rally he attended prompted him to begin reading that paper regularly. He earned a BA in Sociology from Brandeis University in 1969. While there, he joined the Students for a Democratic Society.

== Journalism career ==
After graduation, Blumenthal began his career in Boston as a journalist for the underground paper Boston Phoenix and The Real Paper. Blumenthal was part of a generation of New Left journalists who eschewed objectivity in favor of taking sides. He blamed journalistic detachment for Ronald Reagan's presidential victory. Geraldine Baum wrote in the Los Angeles Times, "In Blumenthal's writings, Democrats stood for goodness and progress, Republicans for darkness and defeat."

=== 1984 political coverage ===
In 1983, Blumenthal became the chief national political correspondent for The New Republic, covering the 1984 United States presidential election. Soon after, Blumenthal began working as a political reporter for The Washington Post before then returning to The New Republic. Blumenthal played a major role in Gary Hart's bid for the 1984 Democratic presidential nomination. Although Hart's bid was ultimately unsuccessful, Blumenthal wrote a speech that was considered a positive "turning point" that established Hart's viability, while also writing a cover story on Hart in The New Republic-- while not disclosing to the magazine's readers he advised Hart and wrote speeches for him. Discomfort with Blumenthal's political involvement contributed to The Washington Post reassigning him to its "Style" section.

=== The New Yorker ===
In 1993, Blumenthal became the chief Washington correspondent for The New Yorker before joining the Clinton Administration in the summer of 1997. Not too long into the job at The New Yorker, Blumenthal was replaced by Michael Kelly, although Blumenthal stayed on as a part-time writer. Howard Kurtz of The Washington Post wrote that "Kelly ordered Blumenthal to stay away from the magazine's downtown office", and Kelly himself explained to the newspaper: "I did not trust [Blumenthal]. I felt his relationship ... with the president and first lady was such that I was not sure I wanted him around the office as I was working on stories. He was serving two masters, and I was not comfortable with that. ... I had reason to believe that he wanted a job with the White House." According to Kelly, "He took a column that had a well-deserved reputation and turned it into a vehicle for the Clintons and for denouncing their enemies." Over time, Blumenthal was eased out of his job. Kurtz wrote that "The New Yorker assignments dwindled", and Blumenthal not long after officially went to work for the Clinton White House.

== Clinton administration years ==
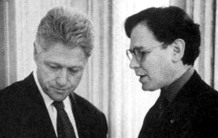
Blumenthal (right) briefs President Bill Clinton in the Oval Office in 1998.

Blumenthal served as assistant and senior advisor to Bill Clinton from August 1997 until January 2001. His roles included advising the President on communications and public policy and serving as liaison between the White House and former colleagues in the Washington press corps. He later became a central figure in the grand jury investigation that ended in the impeachment of President Clinton. While working for Clinton, Blumenthal was known for his loyalty to the Clintons. He was also known for his often baseless attacks on their political adversaries, including Barack Obama when he ran against Hillary Clinton to be the 2008 Democratic nominee for president. This was the primary reason Rahm Emanuel, the first chief of staff for President Obama, barred Blumenthal from a position in the State Department during Hillary Clinton's tenure as Secretary of State.

=== Testimony before Congress ===
In 1998, Christopher Hitchens submitted an affidavit which directly contradicted Blumenthal's testimony in which he stated that he never referred to Monica Lewinsky as a stalker. Lawmakers called on the Department of Justice to prosecute Blumenthal for perjury. Arlen Specter even filed a motion to investigate possible perjury by Blumenthal; however, Hitchens promised to withdraw his affidavit and nothing came of the matter.

=== Clinton impeachment trial ===
During the investigation by independent counsel Kenneth Starr, Blumenthal was called to the grand jury to testify relating to what Clinton had told both Blumenthal and his senior staff in regard to Monica Lewinsky. The leadership of the Republican majority in the House of Representatives felt enough evidence existed in regard to the Paula Jones and Monica Lewinsky cases for impeachment proceedings to begin in December 1998. After the House Judiciary Committee and United States House of Representatives impeached Clinton on December 19, the matter then passed to the United States Senate. Blumenthal was one of only four witnesses called to testify before the Senate. No live witnesses were called, and the four were interviewed on videotape. His testimony addressed a major allegation that Clinton had pressured Betty Currie to falsely attest that it was Lewinsky who initially pursued Clinton, not vice versa; he also said that he believed Clinton told him the truth and thus had no reason to think that he was hiding information. The Senate acquitted Clinton of perjury and obstruction of justice, and the impeachment proceedings ended. In his 2003 book The Clinton Wars, Blumenthal observed that the media frenzy over the Lewinsky scandal had in large part defined Clinton's legacy, and that this was unfair because he said it overshadowed his merits, citing for example Clinton's mediation of international struggles in the Balkans and the Middle East.

=== Blumenthal v. Drudge ===
In 1997, Blumenthal filed a $30 million libel lawsuit against blogger Matt Drudge and AOL, which hired Drudge, stemming from a false claim Drudge made of spousal abuse, attributed only to unnamed "top GOP sources". Drudge retracted the story not long after, saying he had been given bad information. In Blumenthal v. Drudge, the court refused to dismiss Blumenthal's case for lack of personal jurisdiction. Drudge publicly apologized to the Blumenthals, and Blumenthal dropped his lawsuit and reached a settlement involving a nominal payment to Drudge over Blumenthal having missed a deposition. In his book The Clinton Wars, Blumenthal claimed he was forced to settle because he could no longer afford the suit.

=== Relationship with Christopher Hitchens ===
In the mid-1980s, during Blumenthal's visit at the Lehrman Institute, he met fellow journalist Christopher Hitchens. Shortly thereafter, Blumenthal and Hitchens developed a close relationship, which included sharing dinners, attending important family events together, and trading opinions and information. Blumenthal's relationship with Hitchens deteriorated during the impeachment of Bill Clinton. Under subpoena, Hitchens submitted an affidavit to the trial managers of the Republican Party in which Hitchens swore under oath that Blumenthal had described Monica Lewinsky as a stalker. Hitchens' allegations contradicted Blumenthal's own sworn deposition during Clinton's impeachment trial that he never said any such thing. This resulted in a hostile exchange of words between the two men and allegations by congressional Republicans that Blumenthal lied under oath. But Hitchens refused to testify against Blumenthal: "Were my words to be used against Blumenthal, I told [congressional Republicans], I would repudiate them and place myself in contempt," Hitchens later wrote. Following the publication of The Clinton Wars, in which Blumenthal recounted the disagreement, Hitchens wrote several articles in which he once more accused Blumenthal of lying. At the end of his life when Hitchens was dying of cancer, Blumenthal wrote to Hitchens in a letter that, according to Christopher Buckley, contained words of "tenderness and comfort and implicit forgiveness".

== Post-Clinton administration years ==
=== Published works and memoirs ===
After the Clinton presidency, Blumenthal's book, The Clinton Wars, was published in 2003. In her review for The New York Times, Janet Maslin wrote: "Beyond his intention to set the record straight on controversies that plagued the Clinton presidency, Mr. Blumenthal has a more personal agenda. Barely mentioning others close to the Clintons, and illustrating this memoir with smiling, convivial photographs of himself in their company ... Blumenthal sends a clear message to his administration colleagues: Mom liked me best." Maslin further wrote: "The Clinton Wars means to solidify Mr. Blumenthal's place in history. He wrote memos and speeches (included here for the reader to enjoy). He gave valued advice. He came up with the slogan One America, which, he helpfully points out, is 'an updating of E pluribus unum'. He introduced President Clinton to a promising British politician named Tony Blair. And he was often in the presence of greatness. 'I once sat with the president and Tony Blair as, in about 15 minutes, the two men easily thrashed out a prickly trade problem involving bananas and cashmere,' he reveals."

Reviewing the book in The New York Review of Books, Joseph Lelyveld, the former executive editor of The New York Times, wrote that Blumenthal came across as more like a "courtier" than "the bright campaign reporter he once was. ... When it comes to the Clintons, there is not a single line of comparable acuity or detachment in the whole of The Clinton Wars. What you get instead are passages that would have been regarded as above par but hardly fresh if they had appeared in a news magazine cover story ten years ago." Also in The New York Times, historian Robert Dallek wrote that Blumenthal's book was partly "an exercise in score settling" against his "tormentors". Moreover, Dallek wrote, "The book is also an exercise in something all too familiar to inside-the-White-House memoirs – an exaggerated picture of the participant's importance. Comparing himself to the Antichrist in the eyes of the Christian right, Blumenthal 'wondered which of my traits had invited this invective.' Holding center stage, as his massive volume attests, might be one answer." Overall, Dallek praised the book, opining that "Blumenthal's sprawling 800-page memoir of his four years as a presidential assistant" was a "welcome addition to the literature on Bill Clinton's tumultuous second term", and also wrote that "Blumenthal brings a reporter's keen eye for telling detail and a columnist's talent for considered analysis and unmistakable opinion to his reconstruction of what he calls the Clinton wars."

Andrew Sullivan has characterized Blumenthal as "the most pro-Clinton writer on the planet". For Salon, Dwight Garner wrote that Blumenthal's pieces as Washington correspondent of The New Yorker "were so unabashedly pro-Clinton that they quickly became the butt of countless jokes." In addition to The Clinton Wars (2003), Blumenthal's other books include:

- Government by Gunplay: Assassination Conspiracy Theories from Dallas to Today (1976), co-edited with Harvey Yazijian
- The Permanent Campaign: Inside the World of Elite Political Operatives (1980)
- The Rise of the Counter-Establishment: From Conservative Ideology to Political Power (1986)
- Our Long National Daydream: A Political Pageant of the Reagan Era (1988)
- The Reagan Legacy (1988), co-edited with Thomas B. Edsall
- Pledging Allegiance: The Last Campaign of the Cold War (1990)
- How Bush Rules: Chronicles of a Radical Regime (2006), a collection of previously published essays and articles on the presidency of George W. Bush
- The Strange Death of Republican America: Chronicles of a Collapsing Party (2008)
- The Political Life of Abraham Lincoln, a projected five-volume biography (1st three published as of 2026):
  - A Self-Made Man (2016), Volume I
  - Wrestling with His Angel (2017), Volume II
  - All the Powers of Earth (2019), Volume III

=== Return to journalism ===
After 2000, he wrote several essays critical of the administration of George W. Bush.

During the 2004 United States presidential election, Blumenthal was the Washington, D.C., bureau chief for Salon. He also was a regular columnist for The Guardian from August 2003 until November 2007.

In 1998, reporter Michael Powell described Blumenthal as a new type of journalist who eroded the divide between independent journalism and partisan journalism.

=== Film work ===
Blumenthal was a political consultant for the Emmy-award-winning HBO series Tanner '88, written by Garry Trudeau and directed by Robert Altman; he appeared as himself in one episode. He was also an executive producer of the documentary Taxi to the Dark Side, directed by Alex Gibney, which won an Academy Award for Best Documentary of 2007. He also was an associate producer of the 2002 film Max.

=== Relationship to Hillary Clinton and post–2007 employment ===
Blumenthal joined the 2008 Hillary Clinton presidential campaign as a "senior advisor" in November 2007. While on a trip to advise Clinton on her presidential campaign, Blumenthal was arrested for driving while intoxicated (DWI) in Nashua, New Hampshire, on January 7, 2008. He pleaded guilty to a misdemeanor DWI charge.

After Clinton's January 2009 appointment as Secretary of State, Hillary Clinton intended to hire Blumenthal; however, President Barack Obama's chief of staff Rahm Emanuel blocked his selection due to lingering anger among Obama's aides over Blumenthal's role in promoting negative stories about Obama during the Democratic primary. According to a report in The New York Times, "Emanuel talked with Mrs. Clinton ... and explained that bringing Mr. Blumenthal on board was a no-go. The bad blood among his colleagues was too deep, and the last thing the administration needed, he concluded, was dissension and drama in the ranks. In short, Mr. Blumenthal was out."

According to a profile of Blumenthal which later appeared in Vanity Fair, when Clinton "wanted Blumenthal to join her at the State Department as a top aide.... President Obama would not allow it: key White House staffers had grown to detest the man. Two of them – Press Secretary Robert Gibbs and Senior Adviser David Axelrod – threatened to quit if Blumenthal was hired." They believed that "he [Blumenthal] had been involved in spreading unsubstantiated allegations against the Obamas during the 2008 Democratic primary" and Blumenthal was said to be "obsessed" about "the possible existence of a so-called 'whitey tape,' supposedly made at a Chicago church, in which Michelle Obama could be heard ranting against 'whitey'—a tape that could have changed Clinton's political fortunes during her primary fight, but that apparently did not in fact exist." The information that Blumenthal distributed to journalists and political operatives often paralleled conspiracy theories about Obama espoused by conservative activists and conspiracy theorists, often based on scant evidence or unsubstantiated rumors.

=== Clinton Foundation work ===
Blumenthal was a full-time employee of the Clinton Foundation from 2009 until 2013, and then served as a consultant for the foundation from 2013 until 2015, earning for him about $10,000 per month-- amounting to more than a half-million dollars total. Blumenthal's foundation job, which focused on burnishing "the legacy of Clinton's presidency", was viewed by some "officials at the charity [who] questioned his value and grumbled that his hiring was a favor from the Clintons", as reported by Politico. During much of the same time, he was consulting for the foundation, Blumenthal also wrote for numerous magazines and online publications, sometimes about both of the Clintons, without disclosing his financial relationship with the foundation.

During the 2011 uprising in Libya against Muammar Gaddafi, Blumenthal prepared, from public and other sources, about 25 memos which he sent as emails to Clinton in 2011 and 2012, which she shared through her aide, Jake Sullivan, with senior State Department personnel. In the form of intelligence briefings, the memos sometimes touted his business associates and, at times contained inaccurate information. The United States House Select Committee on Benghazi, chaired by Representative Trey Gowdy, Republican of South Carolina, subpoenaed Blumenthal in May 2015. Blumenthal gave testimony in a closed-door session the following month.

Blumenthal's name came up numerous times during the October 22, 2015, full committee public questioning of Hillary Clinton regarding the Benghazi incident, as one of the alleged sources of Clinton's intelligence. During this hearing Democratic members asked that Blumenthal's deposition transcript be made public so that comments regarding his involvement could be placed in context. The motion was defeated by a party-line vote. In 2016, Blumenthal served as a consultant to the left-leaning watchdog group Media Matters for America, the pro-Democratic Super PAC American Bridge 21st Century and the pro-Clinton Super PAC Correct the Record, for which he is reportedly paid $200,000 per year, for part-time work.

=== Connection to Christopher Steele and the second Steele Dossier ===
Journalist and former Clinton aide Cody Shearer had created a second dossier that was filled with notes from his conversations with journalists and other sources. Shearer gave these notes to Blumenthal and several other journalists. Blumenthal passed on the notes to Jonathan Winer at the State Department, who had a previous relationship with Christopher Steele. In September 2016, Blumenthal discussed Steele's report with Winer and told him that the information was similar to information he had received from Shearer. Winer then gave the notes to Steele, who then passed them on to the FBI in October and said it came from a friend of the Clintons.

== Political views ==
Blumenthal was highly critical of George W. Bush and his administration for its use of torture, for revealing the identity Valerie Plame as a CIA source, and its response to Hurricane Katrina. Blumenthal praised Bill Clinton for his work on the Brady Bill and the North American Free Trade Agreement. Blumenthal opposes capital punishment.

== Controversies ==
=== Rumors allegedly spread by Blumenthal ===
Blumenthal gained a reputation for attacking those whom he considered to be enemies of the Clinton administration. Some accused him of acting as Clinton's hatchet man. When Ken Starr was investigating Bill Clinton for his affair with Monica Lewinsky, Blumenthal was alleged to have spread false rumors to reporters including saying that a deputy to Starr had sexually abused boys at a Christian camp and that Lewinsky was a stalker. The New York Observer reported: "In 1995, Mr. Blumenthal told reporters that Alma Powell, Colin Powell's wife, suffered from clinical depression and was thus unfit to be a first lady. At the time, there were rumors that Colin Powell would run in the Republican presidential primaries, a prospect that terrified the Clinton re-election campaign."

=== Alleged breaches of journalistic norms ===
When Blumenthal was a journalist he would sometimes offer Hillary Clinton political advice. Several journalists claimed that offering political advice to Clinton crossed a line as a journalist. Blumenthal also attempted to dissuade journalists and reporters from writing negative pieces about the Whitewater controversy, Travelgate, and Bill Clinton's personal character. Leon Wieseltier, The New Republic literary editor said that "Sidney is capable of writing a piece that is 100% true and 100% dishonest."

In 1995, when Blumenthal was named the chief Washington correspondent for The New Yorker, the position was one of the most prestigious in American journalism. His tenure in the position proved tumultuous, with several of his colleagues alleging that Blumenthal's journalism exhibited extreme bias in favor of then-President Bill Clinton and First Lady Hillary Clinton, that Blumenthal was informally providing political and public relations advice to the Clintons while covering both of them, and that Blumenthal was engaged in disparaging and attacking The New Yorker colleagues whom he believed were writing too critically of the Clintons. Peter Boyer, a New Yorker writer, made allegations claiming Blumenthal tried to sabotage his story about the Travelgate affair. Boyer said that he was later told by either Harry Thomason or his wife, Linda Bloodworth-Thomason, that Blumenthal had warned them that Boyer was anti-Clinton and planned to smear them; this led to a series of legal threats against the magazine. Boyer, who fired off a memo to New Yorker editor Tina Brown, accused Blumenthal of journalistic corruption.

== Personal life ==
Blumenthal lives in Washington, D.C., with his wife, Jacqueline (née Jordan). The couple married in 1976, and have two sons, journalists Max, editor of The Grayzone website, and Paul Blumenthal, a political writer for HuffPost.

Political offices
Preceded by George Stephanopoulos	Senior Advisor to the President; 1997–2001; Served alongside: Rahm Emanuel, Doug Sosnik, Joel Johnson	Succeeded by Karl Rove
