= Andrew Breitbart =

American journalist (1969–2012)

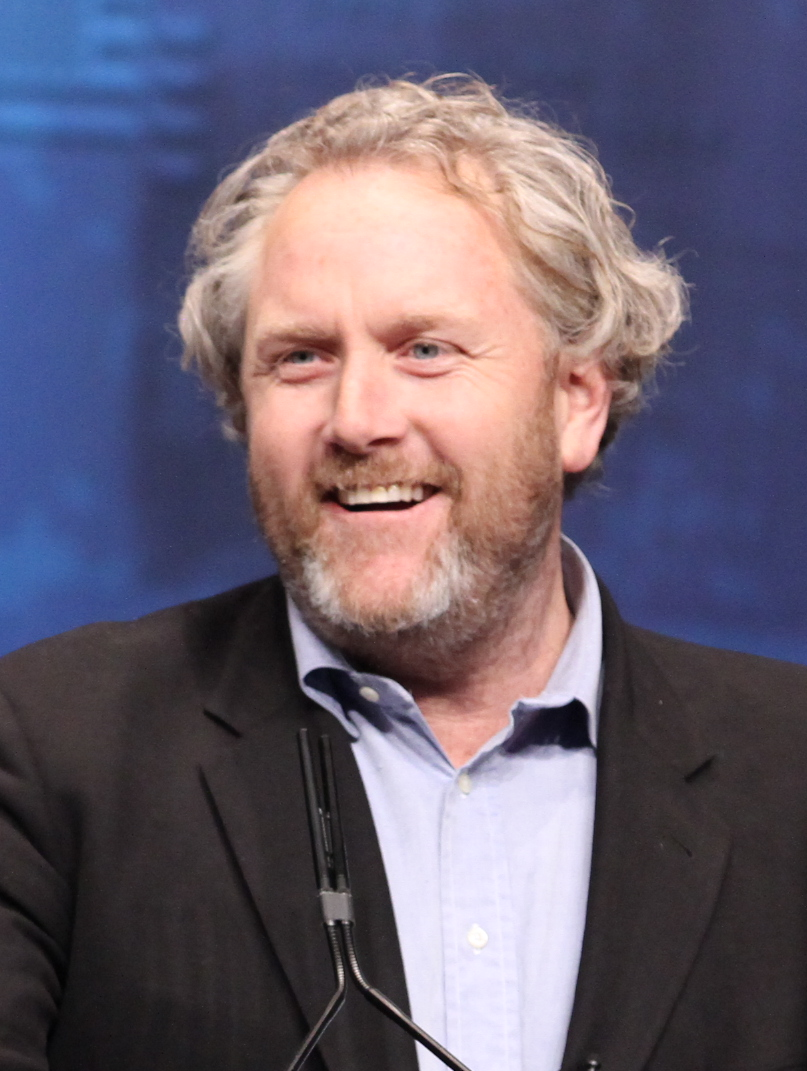
- Breitbart speaking at CPAC, 2012
- Born: Andrew James Breitbart; February 1, 1969; Los Angeles, California, U.S.
- Died: March 1, 2012 (aged 43); Los Angeles, California, U.S.
- Resting place: Hillside Memorial Park Cemetery
- Education: Tulane University (BA)
- Occupations: Writer; columnist; journalist; publisher
- Years active: 1995–2012
- Political party: Republican
- Spouse: Susannah Bean (m. 1997)
- Children: 4
- Website: breitbart.com

Andrew James Breitbart (/ˈbraɪtbɑːrt/; February 1, 1969 – March 1, 2012) was an American conservative journalist and political commentator who was the founder of Breitbart News and a co-founder of HuffPost.

Breitbart played a central role in generating media coverage of the Anthony Weiner sexting scandal, the firing of Shirley Sherrod, and the ACORN 2009 undercover videos controversy. Commenters such as Nick Gillespie and Conor Friedersdorf have credited Breitbart with changing how people wrote about politics by "show[ing] how the Internet could be used to route around information bottlenecks imposed by official spokesmen and legacy news outlets."

== Early life ==
Breitbart was born to Irish American parents in Los Angeles on February 1, 1969. According to his birth certificate, his biological father was a folk singer. When he was three weeks old, he was adopted by Gerald and Arlene Breitbart, a restaurant owner and banker respectively, and grew up in the affluent neighborhood of Brentwood. His adoptive family was Jewish; his mother had converted to Judaism when marrying his father. Breitbart studied at Hebrew school and had a Bar Mitzvah.

Breitbart attended Brentwood School, one of the country's top private schools, but did not distinguish himself, saying: "My sense of humor saved me". However, he discovered that he loved writing, publishing his first comedic piece in the school newspaper, the Brentwood Eagle, analyzing the inequality in his high school's senior and junior parking lots: "One had Mercedes and BMWs, the other Sciroccos and GTIs". Breitbart remembers his upbringing as apolitical, except in one instance: when the family's rabbi tried to defend Jesse Jackson against charges of antisemitism after his "Hymietown" comment, his parents left the synagogue in protest.

Joel Pollak wrote about how (Breitbart's) life and fire extended to Judaism: 'Andrew was proudly, and playfully, Jewish. In the last days of his life he wondered openly about observing Shabbat, even as he continued to tease me about not eating bacon and shrimp cocktails. More than once he burst into a Hebrew school song or parts of his bar mitzva portion while working at his desk across from mine – partly to amuse me and partly to entertain himself.'

Breitbart would remain "proudly and playfully Jewish" throughout his life. The liberal-Left Jewish weekly, The Forward, placed him on their 2010 list of the top 50 most influential American Jews. Joel Pollak wrote: "He carried his faith as he carried all his convictions: with a lighthearted touch but a deep commitment." Breitbart later said of his profession: "I'm glad I've become a journalist because I'd like to fight on behalf of the Israeli people... And the Israeli people, I adore and I love."

While in high school, Breitbart worked as a pizza delivery driver; he sometimes delivered to celebrities such as Judge Reinhold. He earned a BA in American studies from Tulane University in 1991, graduating with "no sense of [his] future whatsoever." His early jobs included a stint at cable channel E! Entertainment Television, working for the company's online magazine, and some time in film production. He was a Lincoln Fellow at the Claremont Institute in 2009.

Previously left-leaning in his politics, Breitbart changed his political views after experiencing "an epiphany" while watching the late 1991 confirmation hearings for Supreme Court justice Clarence Thomas, due to what he considered unfounded attacks on the part of liberals based on former employee Anita Hill's sexual harassment accusations. Breitbart later described himself as "a Reagan conservative" with libertarian sympathies.

Listening to radio hosts such as Rush Limbaugh helped Breitbart refine his political and philosophical positions, igniting an interest in learning that he had suppressed as a result of his distaste for the "nihilistic musings of dead critical theorists" that had dominated his studies at Tulane. In this era, Breitbart also read Camille Paglia's book Sexual Personae (1990), a massive survey of Western art, literature and culture from ancient Egypt to the 20th century, which, he wrote, "made me realize how little I really had learned in college."

== Public life ==
=== Authorship, research, and reporting ===
Breitbart has been lauded for his role in the "evolution of pioneering websites" including The Huffington Post and The Drudge Report, and later, for Breitbart News. Journalists such as Nick Gillespie and Conor Friedersdorf have credited Breitbart with bringing new voices to debates about politics and culture. Breitbart told Reason in 2004 that, after feeling ignored by existing outlets, "We decided to go out and create our media." Described as "a series of do-it-yourself demonstration projects" and "conversation pits", the Breitbart websites have been both criticized and praised for their role in various political issues. Breitbart has been recognized for adopting an inclusive stance with regard to the participation of gay people in the conservative movement. He has also been credited with helping to derail conspiracy theories about Barack Obama's citizenship.

In 1995, Breitbart saw The Drudge Report and was so impressed that he e-mailed Matt Drudge. Breitbart said, "I thought what he was doing was by far the coolest thing on the Internet. And I still do." Breitbart described himself as "Matt Drudge's bitch" and selected and posted links to other news wire sources. Later, Drudge introduced him to a then still-Republican Arianna Huffington and Breitbart subsequently assisted in the creation of The Huffington Post.

Breitbart wrote a weekly column for The Washington Times, which also appeared at Real Clear Politics. Breitbart also co-wrote the book Hollywood, Interrupted: Insanity Chic in Babylon with Mark Ebner, a book that is highly critical of U.S. celebrity culture. On January 19, 2011, the conservative gay rights group GOProud announced Breitbart had joined its Advisory Council.

In 2011, Grand Central Publishing released Breitbart's book Righteous Indignation: Excuse Me While I Save the World, in which he discussed his own political evolution and the part he took in the rise of new media, most notably at the Drudge Report and The Huffington Post.

=== Breitbart News ===
Breitbart launched his first website as a news site; it is often linked to by the Drudge Report and other websites. It has wire stories from the Associated Press, Reuters, Agence France-Presse, Fox News, PR Newswire, and U.S. Newswire, as well as direct links to a number of major international newspapers. Its political viewpoint as well as its audience runs to the right within the U.S. political spectrum. In 2007, Breitbart launched a video blog, Breitbart.tv.

In February 2011, Breitbart and one of his editors Larry O'Connor were sued for defamation by Shirley Sherrod, who had been fired after Breitbart posted a video of a speech given by Sherrod. The video had been selectively edited to suggest that she had purposely discriminated against a white farmer, while in reality the unedited video told the story of how she had helped that farmer. Breitbart himself maintained that he stated this in his article about it, and that the purpose of the video was to show the crowd's positive reaction to Sherrod's statements about discriminating against the white farmer. In July 2015, it was reported that Sherrod and Breitbart's estate had reached a tentative settlement. It was reported October 1, 2016, that the lawsuit was settled.

In June 2011, Breitbart's websites broke the story that congressman Anthony Weiner was sending underage females revealing photographs of himself.

Since Breitbart's passing, under Steve Bannon's leadership, Breitbart News has become recognized as a far-right news and opinion website, which has been described as misogynistic, xenophobic, and racist by academics and journalists, notably The University of California Press. (Note: Multiple sources: Higdon, Nolan (2020). The Anatomy of Fake News: A Critical News Literacy Education. University of California Press. pp. 105–109. ISBN 978-0-520-34787-8 – via Google Books. "Breitbart relied on fear-inspiring racist and xenophobic narratives that had salience with whites who were reacting to the economic anxiety over the Great Recession with racial resentment over the election of the first self-identified black president and the increase in the proportion of the US population made up of racial minorities. [...] The election of President Barack Obama saw Breitbart continue the long-standing American practice of spreading racist-laden fake news stories. For example, Breitbart stories claimed that Obama was born in Kenya and supported terrorist organizations. Breitbart's fake news stories were not only racist but xenophobic and Islamophobic"; DiMaggio, Anthony R. (December 30, 2021). "The Trojan Horse "Conservative" Media and the Mainstreaming of Neofascistic Politics". Rising Fascism in America: It Can Happen Here. Routledge. pp. 93–97. doi:10.4324/9781003198390-3. ISBN 978-1-000-52308-9. S2CID 244786335 – via Google Books. "But an analysis of Breitbart's content demonstrates the venue's commitment to normalizing neofascistic ideology, even as it refuses to acknowledge what it is doing. As Rolling Stone identified when it ran a November 2016 profile piece, Breitbart has a troubling history of promoting misogyny, Islamophobia, homophobia, and racism. [...] Concerning black-white relations in the United states, Breitbart also has an eliminationist-style rhetoric that depicts protests of racial inequality and police brutality as a fundamental threat to the nation."; Bhat, Prashanth; Vasudevan, Krishnan (May 20, 2019). "National Review: Opposing "Trumpbart"". In Atkinson, Joshua D.; Kenix, Linda (eds.). Alternative Media Meets Mainstream Politics: Activist Nation Rising. Rowman & Littlefield. pp. 56–57. ISBN 978-1-4985-8435-7 – via Google Books. "Third, writers at National Review took a moral high ground and accused Breitbart and Donald Trump of enthusing extremist groups associated with the alt-right, which the publication claimed were known for their misogyny, sexism, racism, and xenophobia. [...] By calling Breitbart "the homepage for peckerwood-trash racists and the white-power basement dwellers," National Review accused the far-right media outlet of paving the way for white supremacists to enter the mainstream."; Andersen, Robin (September 29, 2017). "Weaponizing Social Media: "The Alt-Right," the Election of Donald J. Trump, and the Rise of Ethno-Nationalism in the United States". In Andersen, Robin; de Silva, Purnaka L. (eds.). The Routledge Companion To Media and Humanitarian Action. Routledge. pp. 487–500. doi:10.4324/9781315538129-49. ISBN 9781315538129. "A key to Breitbart's success has long been the fake news modules, misinformation and propagandized narratives that form the content core of the Breitbart News website. Breitbart has carefully honed an anti-immigration, anti-Muslim online presence in a media universe complete with stories that raise fears of "white genocide"."; Bhat, Prashanth (December 10, 2019). "Advertisements in the Age of Hyper-Partisan Media: Breitbart's #DumpKelloggs Campaign". In Gutsche, Robert E. Jr. (ed.). The Trump Presidency, Journalism, and Democracy (PDF). Routledge. pp. 192–205. ISBN 9780367891527 – via Open Research Library. "By March 2017, they have collectively purchased less than 0.5 percent of Breitbart's inventory. These agencies have listed Breitbart to their list of brand-unsafe websites because the far-right site violated their hate speech policies (Benes, 2017). [...] In the case of Breitbart, brands such as Kellogg's withdrew ads because they didn't want to be associated with a media outlet that produces racist and xenophobic content."; Victor, Daniel; Stack, Liam (November 14, 2016). "Stephen Bannon and Breitbart News, in Their Words". The New York Times. ISSN 0362-4331. "Critics, including some conservatives formerly associated with it, have denounced Breitbart in its current incarnation as a hate site steeped in misogyny, homophobia, transphobia, white nationalism and anti-Semitism."; Grynbaum, Michael M.; Herrman, John (August 26, 2016). "Breitbart Rises From Outlier to Potent Voice in Campaign". The New York Times. Archived from the original on November 29, 2022.)

=== Commentaries ===
In 2009, Breitbart appeared as a commentator on Real Time with Bill Maher and Dennis Miller. In 2004, he was a guest commentator on Fox News Channel's morning show and frequently appeared as a guest panelist on Fox News's late night program, Red Eye w/ Greg Gutfeld. Breitbart also appeared as a commentator in the 2004 documentary Michael Moore Hates America.

On October 22, 2009, Breitbart appeared on the C-SPAN program Washington Journal. He gave his opinions on the mainstream media, Hollywood, the Obama administration and his personal political views, having heated debates with several callers.

In the hours immediately following Senator Ted Kennedy's death, Breitbart called Kennedy a "villain", a "duplicitous bastard", a "prick" and "a special pile of human excrement", adding, "Sorry, he destroyed lives. And he knew it," referring to Kennedy's actions during the Chappaquiddick incident, the Robert Bork Supreme Court nomination, and the Clarence Thomas Supreme Court nomination.

In February 2010, Breitbart received the Reed Irvine Accuracy in Media Award during the Conservative Political Action Conference in Washington, D.C. During his acceptance speech, he responded directly to accusations by The New York Times reporter Kate Zernike that Jason Mattera, a young conservative activist, had been using "racial tones" in his allusions to President Barack Obama, and had spoken in a "Chris Rock voice". From the podium, Breitbart called Zernike "a despicable human being" for having made such allegations about what, according to him, was just Mattera's Brooklyn accent. At the same conference, Breitbart was also filmed saying to journalist Max Blumenthal that he found him to be "a jerk" and "a despicable human being" over a blog entry in which Blumenthal accused Breitbart of employing a racist. Blumenthal was referring to James O'Keefe over his having attended a Georgetown Law Center discussion on race featuring Kevin Martin, John Derbyshire, and Jared Taylor, the last of whom founded American Renaissance, a white supremacist online magazine. Neither O'Keefe nor Breitbart endorsed Taylor's views.

In 2011, Breitbart said that "of course" Donald Trump was not a conservative, adding:

But this is a message to those candidates who are languishing at 2 percent and 3 percent within the Republican Party who are brand names in Washington, but the rest of the country don't know ... celebrity is everything in this country. And if these guys don't learn how to play the media the way that Barack Obama played the media last election cycle and the way that Donald Trump is playing the election cycle, we're going to probably get a celebrity candidate.

These comments resurfaced after the controversy of Donald Trump hiring Breitbart News' executive chairman Steve Bannon to be his White House Chief Strategist.

=== Activism ===
Breitbart often appeared as a speaker at Tea Party movement events across the U.S. For example, Breitbart was a speaker at the first National Tea Party Convention at Gaylord Opryland Hotel in Nashville on February 6, 2010. Breitbart later involved himself in a controversy over allegations of homophobic and racial slurs being used at a March 20, 2010, rally at the United States Capitol in Washington, D.C., by asserting that slurs were never used, and that "it was a set-up" by Nancy Pelosi and the Democratic Party. Breitbart offered to donate $100,000 to the United Negro College Fund "for any audio/video footage of the N-word being hurled," claiming that the several Congressmen made it up. Breitbart insisted Congressman John Lewis and several other witnesses were forced to lie, concluding that "Nancy Pelosi did a great disservice to a great civil rights icon by thrusting him out there to perform this mischievous task. His reputation is now on the line as a result of her desperation to take down the Tea Party movement."

In February 2012, a YouTube video showed Breitbart yelling at Occupy D.C. protesters outside a Washington hotel hosting a Conservative Political Action Conference (CPAC). The video showed security escorting Breitbart back to the hotel while he told the protesters to "behave yourself", and alluding to reported assaults of women at Occupy encampments, he repeatedly yelled, "Stop raping people", and called the protestors "filthy, filthy, raping, murdering freaks!" David Carr said with the incident Breitbart had caused his last "viral storm on the Web."

Breitbart appeared posthumously in Occupy Unmasked, a documentary film by Steve Bannon that contends that the Occupy Wall Street movement of "largely naïve students and legitimately concerned citizens looking for answers" is actually orchestrated by sinister, violent, and organized leaders with the purpose of not just changing, but destroying the American government.

== Political views ==
Breitbart described himself as "eighty-five per cent conservative and fifteen per cent libertarian". Breitbart had previously described himself as a Democrat but shifted towards being conservative after witnessing the Democrats' treatment of Clarence Thomas during his senate confirmation hearing.

Breitbart supported legalization of prostitution, gay rights, and drug liberalization. He was an opponent of multiculturalism and political correctness. Breitbart argued for US military intervention in Syria, North Korea, Iran, and China for humanitarian reasons. He was also a supporter of Israel.

Breitbart was a proponent of the Cultural Marxism conspiracy theory, claiming there are academics attempting to undermine western culture.

=== Breitbart Doctrine ===
The Breitbart Doctrine is the idea that "politics is downstream from culture" and that to change politics one must first change culture.

Christopher Wylie, a former employee of Cambridge Analytica stated in an interview with The Guardian:

The reason why he [Steve Bannon] was interested in this is because he believes in this idea of the 'Breitbart Doctrine', which is that if you want to change politics you first have to change culture because politics flows from culture. If you want to change culture, you have to first understand what the units of culture are, and the people are the units of culture. So, if you want to change politics, you first have to change people to change culture.

— Chris Wylie, 2018

Breitbart considered this idea an important one and often spoke of it in interview or cited it in print.

== Personal life and death ==
Breitbart was married to Susannah Bean, the daughter of actor Orson Bean and fashion designer Carolyn Maxwell, and had four children.

At around 11:30 p.m. PST on February 29, 2012, Breitbart collapsed on a street near his home in Brentwood. He was rushed to Ronald Reagan UCLA Medical Center, where he was pronounced dead at 12:19 a.m. on March 1, 2012. He was 43 years old.

An autopsy by the Los Angeles County Coroner's Office showed that he had hypertrophic cardiomyopathy with focal coronary atherosclerosis and died from congestive heart failure, which had been diagnosed the year before.

=== Tributes ===
Rick Santorum, Reince Priebus, Mitt Romney, Jonah Goldberg, Joel Pollak, Sarah Palin, Matt Drudge, Sean Hannity, Michael Steele, Tucker Carlson, Glenn Beck, Rush Limbaugh, and Newt Gingrich paid tribute to Breitbart. Santorum called Breitbart's death "a huge loss" that strongly affected him. Romney praised Breitbart as a "fearless conservative", while Gingrich remembered him as "the most innovative pioneer in conservative activist social media in America".

A special episode of Red Eye w/ Greg Gutfeld aired the day after Breitbart's death as the host and panelists paid their tributes and showed clips from his appearances on the show.

== Works ==
- Righteous Indignation: Excuse Me While I Save the World. Grand Central Publishing. April 15, 2011. ISBN 978-0-446-57282-8 – via Internet Archive.
- Ebner, Mark C.; Andrew Breitbart (March 10, 2005). Hollywood, Interrupted: Insanity Chic in Babylon – The Case Against Celebrity. Wiley. ISBN 978-0-471-70624-3.
