= Ashley Todd mugging hoax =

2008 United States racial hoax

- Date: October 22, 2008; 17 years ago
- Type: Racial hoax
- Motive: Attempt to discredit Barack Obama's candidacy for United States president
- Perpetrator: Ashley Todd
- Injuries: 1 (self-inflicted)
- Convictions: Filing a false report
- Sentence: Probation

In October 2008, Ashley Todd, a volunteer for the U.S. presidential campaign of Republican John McCain, falsely claimed to have been the victim of robbery and politically motivated physical assault by a supporter of McCain's Democratic opponent Barack Obama. The story broke less than two weeks before the 2008 United States presidential election on November 4. Todd later confessed to inventing the story after surveillance photos and a polygraph test were presented. She was charged with filing a false police report, and entered a probation program for first-time offenders.

== Initial claim and political commentary ==
Todd had worked as a field representative for the College Republican National Committee since August 2008 and had come to Pittsburgh, Pennsylvania in mid-October to recruit college students. On October 22, 2008, Todd claimed that she was robbed at knifepoint by a "six-foot-four African American of medium build, dressed in dark clothes wearing shiny shoes" at a Citizens Bank ATM in the Bloomfield neighborhood of Pittsburgh. She also alleged that after the robber saw a McCain bumper sticker on Todd's car, he assaulted her, cut a reversed letter B into her cheek, and told her "you are going to be a Barack supporter."

Todd's story received international attention, including prominent coverage on the Drudge Report and Fox News. John Moody, executive vice president at Fox News, commented in a blog on the network's website that "this incident could become a watershed event in the 11 days before the election", but also warned that "[i]f the incident turns out to be a hoax, Senator McCain's quest for the presidency is over, forever linked to race-baiting."

== Hoax exposure ==
On October 24, Todd confessed to inventing the story after police reviewed surveillance camera photos and administered a polygraph test. She now said that she had seen the backwards "B" on her face while driving, and although she did not remember how she got it, assumed that she herself had done it because she had had previous episodes of memory loss. According to police, Todd provided no explanation of why she had told them the story about the mugging instead.

Todd was charged with filing a false police report, a misdemeanor charge with a maximum jail sentence of two years. While jailed, Todd underwent a court-ordered psychiatric examination and was deemed to be competent to stand trial, but in need of further counseling. On October 30, she agreed to a deal in which she was released from jail, but was required to undergo psychiatric counseling as a condition of her release. Upon her formal arraignment in January, Todd would enter a probation program for first-time offenders, after which her record would be expunged if there had been no further offenses. Continued mental health counseling would also be a condition of the probation period. The deal did not require Todd to enter a plea.

== Prior claim by Todd ==
According to an October 25, 2008 article in the Pittsburgh Post-Gazette, in February 2008, Todd had claimed that her car's tires had been slashed and campaign material had been stolen from her car because of her support for Republican politician Ron Paul, an opponent of McCain for the Republican presidential nomination. Group leader Dustan Costine told the Post-Gazette that Todd was asked to leave the local Ron Paul grassroots group a month later, after she posed as a Mike Huckabee supporter and called the local Republican committee seeking information about its campaign strategies.

== See also ==
- October surprise
- Racial hoax
