= Drudge (TV program) =

American television series

- Presented by: Matt Drudge
- Country of origin: United States
- Original language: English

Original release
- Network: Fox News Channel
- Release: June 1998 – November 13, 1999

Drudge is an American television series on Fox News Channel hosted by Matt Drudge that debuted June 1998. Drudge left the show in 1999 after network executives refused to let him show a picture of a 21-week-old unborn child.
