= Matt Drudge =

American internet journalist and talk radio host

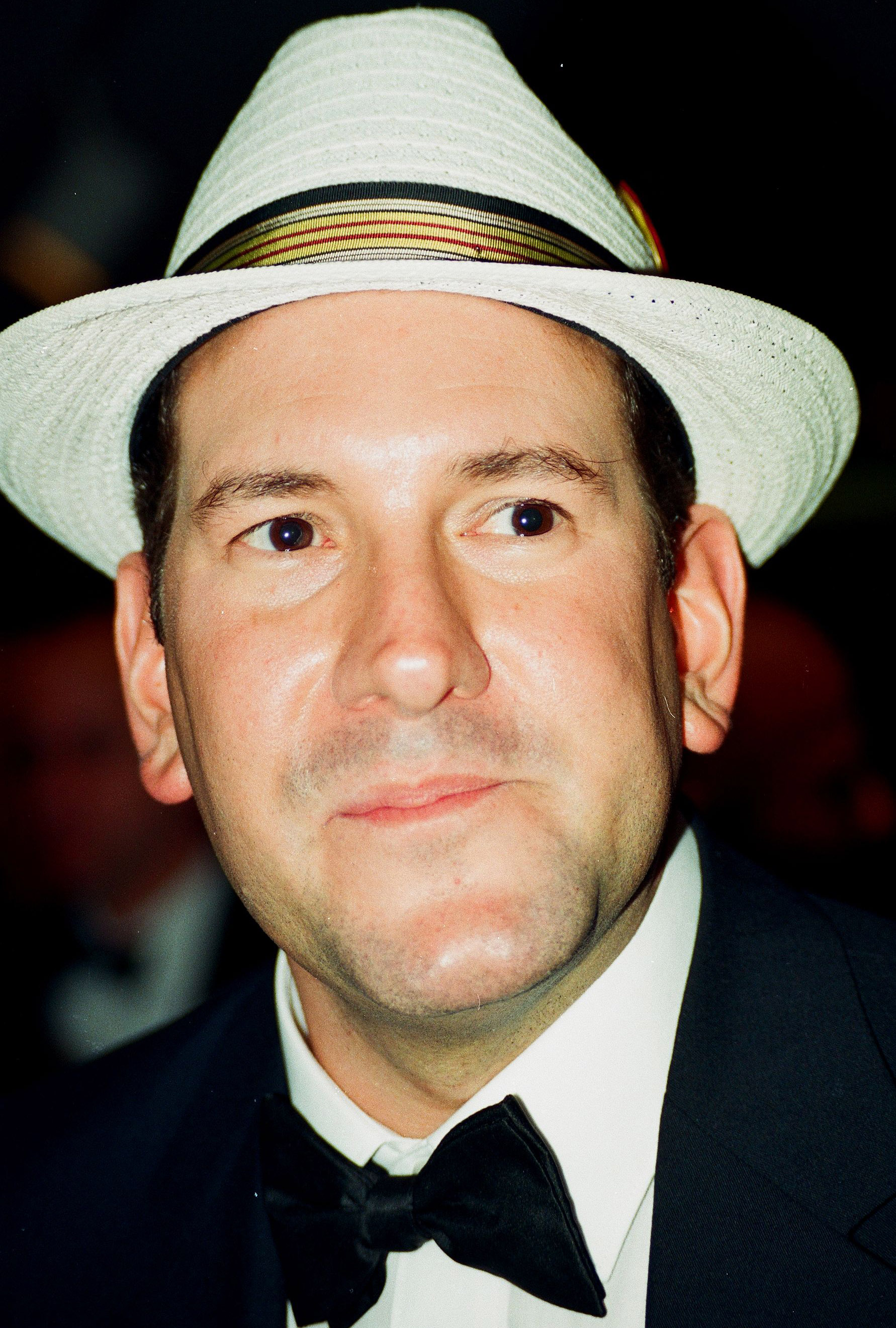
- Drudge in 1996
- Born: Matthew Nathan Drudge; October 27, 1966 (age 60); Takoma Park, Maryland, U.S.
- Occupations: Political commentator, news editor
- Known for: Reporting political scandals, creating the Drudge Report

Matthew Nathan Drudge (born October 27, 1966) is an American journalist and the creator/editor of the Drudge Report, an American news aggregator. Drudge is also an author and a former radio and television show host.

== Early life and education ==
Drudge was raised in Takoma Park, Maryland, near Washington, D.C. His father, Robert Drudge, a former social worker, and his mother divorced when he was six. Drudge went to live with his mother. He had few friends and was an avid news reader and radio talk show fan. Drudge graduated 325th out of a high school class of 350. In his book Drudge Manifesto, Drudge says that he "failed his Bar Mitzvah".

== Career ==
=== Drudge Report ===
Drudge was unknown before he began the news aggregation site Drudge Report. For many years, he took odd jobs such as night counterman at a 7-Eleven convenience store, telemarketer for Time-Life books, McDonald's manager, and sales assistant at a New York City grocery store. In 1989, he moved to Los Angeles, where he took up residence in a small Hollywood apartment. He took a job in the gift shop of CBS studios, eventually working his way up to manager. Here, he was apparently privy to some inside gossip, part of the inspiration for founding the Drudge Report. Worried about his son's aimlessness, Drudge's father insisted on buying him a Packard Bell computer in 1994. The Drudge Report began as email notes sent out to a few friends.

The original issues were part gossip and part opinion. They were distributed as an email newsletter and posted to the alt.showbiz.gossip Usenet forum. In 1996, the newsletter transitioned slowly from entertainment gossip to political gossip and moved from email to the Web as its primary distribution mechanism.

In March 1995, the Drudge Report had 1,000 email subscribers; by 1997, Drudge had 85,000 subscribers to his email service. Drudge's website gained in popularity in the late 1990s when he reported a number of stories before the mainstream media. Drudge first received national attention in 1996 when he broke the news that Jack Kemp would be Republican Bob Dole's running mate in the 1996 presidential election. In 1998, he gained popularity when he published the reporting of then-Newsweek reporter Michael Isikoff, becoming the first media outlet to publish the news that later became the Clinton–Lewinsky scandal.

Drudge met Andrew Breitbart in Los Angeles during the 1990s and became his mentor, with Breitbart later helping to run the Drudge Report. Breitbart announced in 2005 that he was "amicably leaving the Drudge Report after a long and close working relationship with Matt Drudge", but still helped run Drudge's website from Los Angeles by working the afternoon shift, in addition to running Breitbart.

A story by Business 2.0 magazine from April 2003 estimated that Drudge's website received $3,500 a day (almost $1.3 million a year) in advertising revenues. Subtracting his relatively minor server costs, the magazine estimated that the Drudge Report website netted $800,000 a year. An article in The Miami Herald from September 2003 said that Drudge estimated he earns $1.2 million a year from his website and radio show. During an April 30, 2004, appearance on C-SPAN, he confirmed that he earned over $1 million.

For many years, Drudge was based out of his one-bedroom apartment in Hollywood. Today, he maintains the website from his two properties in Miami, Florida. In 2009 he was reported as monitoring multiple television news channels and a number of websites on several computers in his home office to update the website.

=== Fox News television show ===
From June 1998 to November 1999, Drudge hosted a Saturday night television show called Drudge on the Fox News Channel. The show ended by mutual agreement. Drudge had refused to go on air, charging Fox News with censorship, when the network prevented him from showing photos of surgery on Samuel Armas. Drudge, who opposes abortion, wanted to use a picture of a tiny hand reaching out from the womb to dramatize his argument against late-term abortion, but Fox's John Moody decided that that would be misleading because the photo was not of an abortion but an emergency operation on the fetus for spina bifida. Fox News alleged breach of contract but, after Drudge issued an apology, Fox issued a statement calling the parting "amicable".

=== Radio talk show ===
Drudge hosted a Sunday night talk radio show – "the only time anyone will let me on the air", he quipped. The show, which was also named the Drudge Report, was syndicated by Premiere Radio Networks. He guest hosted for the conservative radio talk show host Rush Limbaugh. Drudge gained notice in the early 2000s by becoming a frequent reference for news material on Limbaugh's, Sean Hannity's, and Mark Levin's radio shows. He was often acknowledged by Michael Savage as a source of topics for The Savage Nation. Lynn Samuels, for a time, served as Drudge's call screener.

Drudge left his position as radio host with Premiere effective September 30, 2007. He was replaced by Cincinnati radio station WLW's Bill Cunningham on the network and in most markets, though in a few larger markets, John Batchelor replaced him instead.

=== Books ===
The Drudge Revolution: The Inside Story of How Talk Radio, Fox News, and a Gift Shop Clerk with an Internet Connection Took Down the Mainstream Media was published on July 28, 2020. The book's author, Matthew Lysiak, interviewed over 200 former friends and associates, including former Drudge Report editor Joseph Curl.

Drudge wrote a book with Julia Phillips in 2000 titled Drudge Manifesto, which reached the New York Times Best Seller list. The book features a transcript of a Q&A session conducted at the National Press Club on June 2, 1998, which lays out Drudge's raison d'être. It also contains copies of emails sent to Drudge by his readers, transcripts of Drudge talking to his cat, and extensive descriptions of parties Drudge has attended and how the celebrities there reacted to him. A review in The Washington Post said: "Indeed, while Drudge Manifesto runs 247 pages ... Which leaves, in the end, 112 pages of new material, including nine pages of poetry." A review from the Columbia Journalism Review stated: "By any standard, Drudge's book is padded", and: "It is a weird, stream-of-conscious mixture of telling readers how he got his stories and mocking his critics."

== Influence ==
In their 2006 book The Way to Win, Mark Halperin and John Harris report that Republican National Convention chairman Ken Mehlman "kind of brags" (as then-CNN host Howard Kurtz put it) about utilizing the Drudge channel. They also wrote that "Drudge, with his droll Dickensian name, was not the only media or political agent whose actions led to John Kerry's defeat. But his role placed him at the center of the game."

In 2006, Time named Drudge one of the 100 most influential people in the world, describing the Drudge Report as "a ludicrous combination of gossip, political intrigue and extreme weather reports ... still put together mostly by the guy who started out as a convenience-store clerk."

ABC News concluded that the Drudge Report sets the tone for national political coverage. The article says "Republican operatives keep an open line to Drudge, often using him to attack their opponents."

In October 2006, Washington Post editor Len Downie, speaking at the Online News Association's annual convention in Washington, D.C., said, "Our largest driver of traffic is Matt Drudge."

On October 22, 2007, New York Times reporter Jim Rutenberg wrote that Republican and Democratic presidential candidates, including Hillary Clinton, were cooperating with Drudge and "working harder than ever to get favorable coverage for their candidates – or unfavorable coverage of competitors – onto the Drudge Report's home page, knowing that television producers, radio talk show hosts and newspaper reporters view it as a bulletin board for the latest news and gossip." Rutenberg stated that Nielsen/NetRatings show that the Drudge Report gets three million unique visitors over the course of a month, or approximately one percent of the population of the United States.

During the 2012 Republican presidential primaries, Drudge was described by some, including former presidential candidate Fred Thompson, as having a pro-Mitt Romney slant.

In the 2020 book Drudge Revolution, author Matthew Lysiak describes how every major presidential campaign dating back to the late 90s had a staffer whose responsibility was to make a connection and potentially influence Drudge. Ahead of the 2008 Democratic primaries, Hillary Clinton communication director Tracy Sefl befriended Drudge, a relationship which she describes in the book as "scary" due to the power of the Drudge Report.

In 2024, Drudge was ranked seventh on Mediaite's Most Influential in News Media. Mediaite stated, "Drudge will remain a dominant player – and potentially painful thorn in Trump's side – for the next four years."

In 2025, Drudge was again ranked seventh on Mediaite's Most Influential in News Media list. Mediaite noted that Drudge has "maintained his enormous influence" and that The Drudge Report remains a widely consulted news aggregation site despite its unchanged design since the 1990s. The publication observed that Drudge's political positioning evolved during the Trump era, shifting from consistent Republican support to more frequent criticism of former President Donald Trump, including throughout the 2024 election cycle and into 2025. Mediaite highlighted the site's sustained reach, role in shaping political news cycles, and ongoing impact on publishers and political communications, despite Drudge's largely reclusive public profile.

== Personal life ==
Drudge previously lived in Hollywood, California. As of 2007, he owned two properties in Miami, Florida – a $1.4 million Mediterranean-style stucco house on Rivo Alto Island and a $1 million-plus condominium in Miami's Four Seasons hotel. By early 2009, Drudge earned millions of dollars a year, traveled extensively, and moved to another property in Miami. In 2003, he said his one indulgence, apart from travel, was his Corvette.

=== Political views ===
In every state and nearly every civilized nation in the developed world, readers know where to go for action and reaction of news – at least one day ahead... Free from any corporate concerns, there are simply too many to thank since the site's inception in 1994. This new attempt at the old American experiment of full freedom in reporting is ever exciting. Those in power have everything to lose by individuals who march to their own rules.

— The Drudge Report, Matt Drudge, on reaching one billion page views, 2002

The Daily Telegraph has described Drudge as a conservative populist. In 1998, Drudge claimed that his politics are "libertarian except for drugs and abortion". In 2001, he told the Miami New Times: "I am a conservative. I'm very much pro-life. If you go down the list of what makes up a conservative, I'm there almost all the way." In 2002, he described himself as "Free from any Corporate Concerns". In a 2005 interview with The Sunday Times, Drudge described his politics: "I'm not a right-wing Republican. I'm a conservative and want to pay less taxes. And I did vote Republican at the last election. But I'm more of a populist."

The Drudge Report's coverage of Donald Trump shifted over time. During the 2016 presidential campaign, the site was strongly favorable to Trump; Republican rival Ted Cruz described it at the time as "basically the attack site for the Donald Trump campaign". During Trump's presidency, however, the site became increasingly critical. By the 2020 election, Trump and Drudge had publicly fallen out, with Trump stating that he had "given up on Drudge" long before. The site subsequently continued to feature strongly critical coverage of Trump and favorable coverage of his Democratic opponents. In 2024, The Hill described Drudge's stance as having taken a "sharp anti-Trump turn".

=== Comments by journalists ===
Drudge has been called "the Walter Cronkite of his era" by Mark Halperin and John F. Harris, and "the country's reigning mischief-maker" by Todd Purdum of The New York Times. Michael Isikoff of Newsweek said "Drudge is a menace to honest, responsible journalism. And to the extent that he's read and people believe what they read, he's dangerous." Camille Paglia called Drudge "the kind of bold, entrepreneurial, free-wheeling, information-oriented outsider we need far more of in this country." David McClintick described him as "a modern Tom Paine, a possible precursor to millions of town criers using the Internet to invade the turf of bigfoot journalists."
