= Mark Ebner =

American investigative journalist

- Born: Mark Charles Ebner; September 5, 1959 (age 67); Providence, Rhode Island, U.S.
- Occupation: Investigative journalist
- Years active: 1982–present
- Website: www.hollywoodinterrupted.com

Mark Charles Ebner (born September 6, 1959) is an American journalist and a New York Times bestselling author who has covered celebrity and crime culture for Spy, Rolling Stone, Maxim, Details, Los Angeles Magazine, Premiere, Salon, Spin, Radar, The Daily Beast, Gawker, BoingBoing, and New Times. Ebner has covered the Church of Scientology, Bill Cosby's rape accusations, pit bull fighting, the Ku Klux Klan, celebrity stalkers, drug kingpins, missing porn star Viper, sports groupies, college suicides, and hepatitis C in Hollywood.

He has produced for, and/or appeared as a commentator on news stations NBC, ABC, CBS, CNN, MSNBC, FOX, A&E, Comedy Central, Reelz, Showtime, History Channel, Channel 4 (UK), National Public Radio, Court TV, and TruTV, and the entertainment shows The Daily Show with Jon Stewart, The Today Show, The Early Show, Out Front with Erin Burnett, Anderson Cooper 360°, Fox & Friends, Inside Edition, Hard Copy, Tough Crowd with Colin Quinn, Crime Watch Daily, and Media Mayhem. Ebner consulted for Comedy Central on "Trapped in the Closet", an episode of South Park, and for NBC/Dateline on "The Paris Hilton Tapes". He hosted "Rich and Reckless" for TruTV. His books include Hollywood, Interrupted, Poison Candy, Being Uncle Charlie, We Have Your Husband, Six Degrees of Paris Hilton, and Off the Deep End.

== See also ==
- Philip Gale
