= List of United States local officials convicted of federal corruption offenses =

This is a list of notable United States local officials convicted of federal public corruption offenses for conduct while in office. The list is organized by office. Non-notable officials, such as sewer inspectors and zoning commissioners, are not included on this list, although they are routinely prosecuted for the same offenses. Acquitted officials are not listed (if an official was acquitted on some counts, and convicted on others, the counts of conviction are listed). Officials convicted of state crimes are not listed.

For a more complete list see: List of American state and local politicians convicted of crimes.

The criminal statute(s) under which the conviction(s) were obtained are noted, as are the names of notable investigations or scandals, if applicable. If a defendant is convicted of a conspiracy to commit a corruption offense, the substantive offense is listed. Convictions of non-corruption offenses, such as making false statements, perjury, obstruction of justice, electoral fraud, and campaign finance regulations, even if related, are not noted. Nor are derivative convictions, such as tax evasion or money laundering. Officials convicted only of non-corruption offenses are not included on this list, even if indicted on corruption offenses as well. Certain details, including post-conviction relief, if applicable, are included in footnotes.

The Hobbs Act (enacted 1934), the mail and wire fraud statutes (enacted 1872), including the honest services fraud provision, the Travel Act (enacted 1961), the Racketeer Influenced and Corrupt Organizations Act (RICO) (enacted 1970), and the federal program bribery statute, 18 U.S.C. § 666 (enacted 1984), permit the prosecution of such officials. These statutes are also applicable to corrupt federal officials. In addition, federal officials are subject to the federal bribery, graft, and conflict-of-interest crimes contained in Title 18, Chapter 11 of the United States Code, 18 U.S.C. §§ 201–227, which do not apply to state and local officials.

== Mayors ==
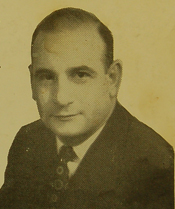
Mayor Addonizio

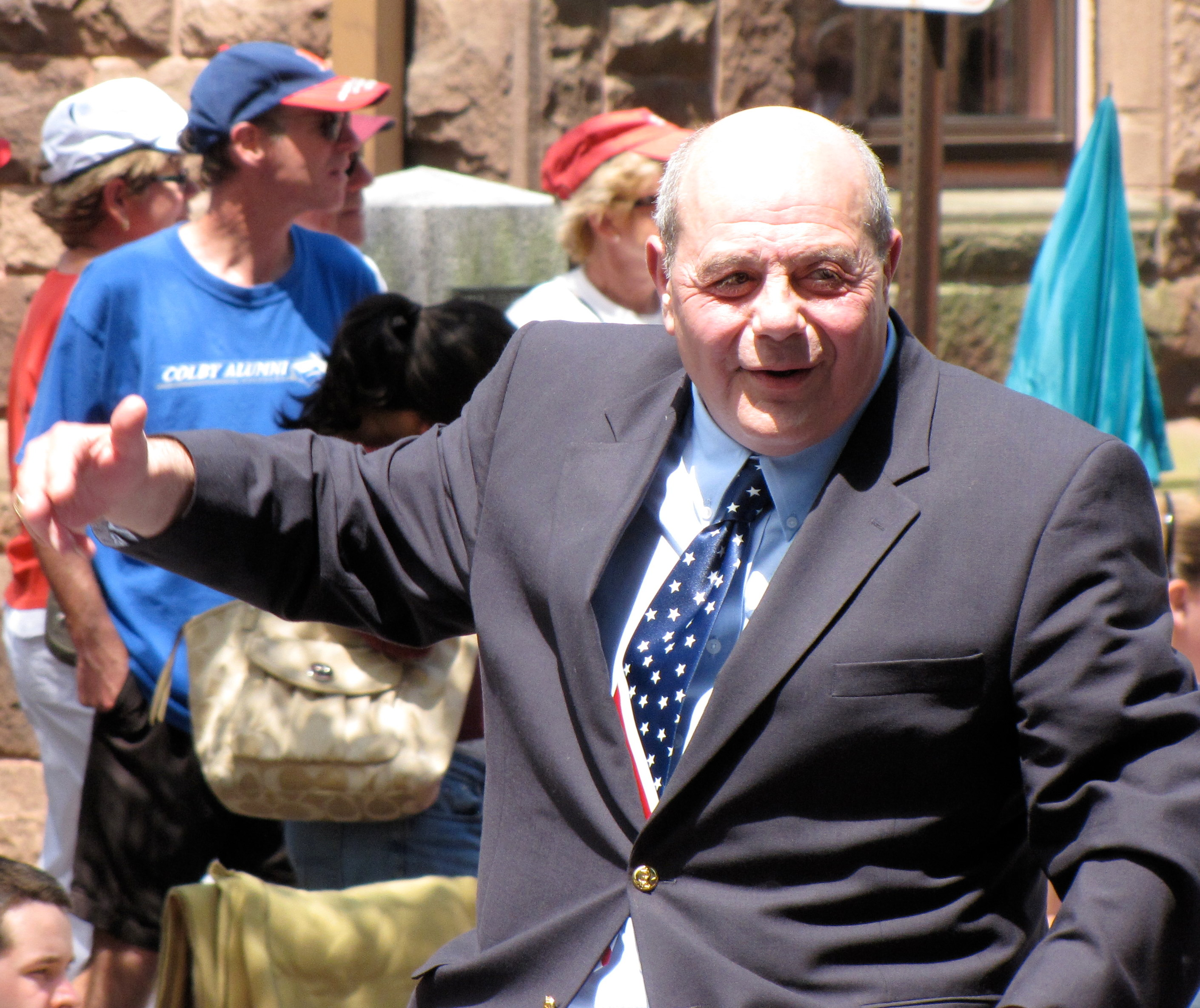
Mayor Cianci

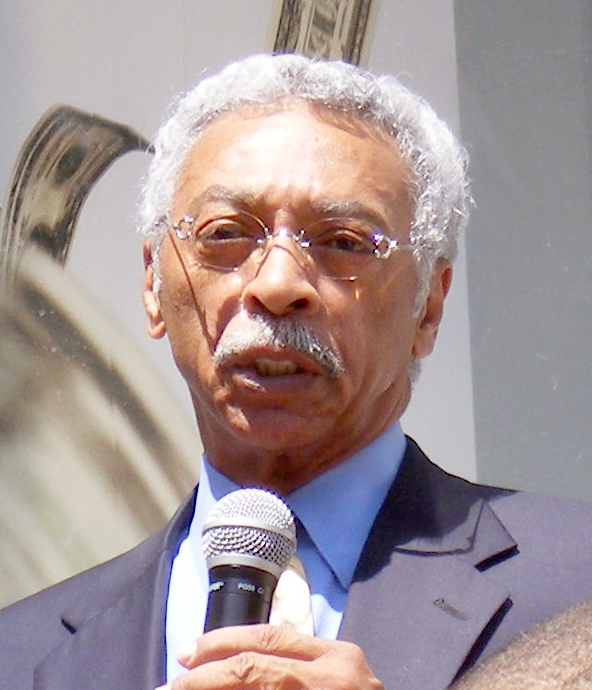
Mayor Langford

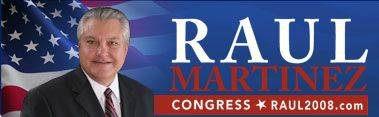
Mayor Martinez

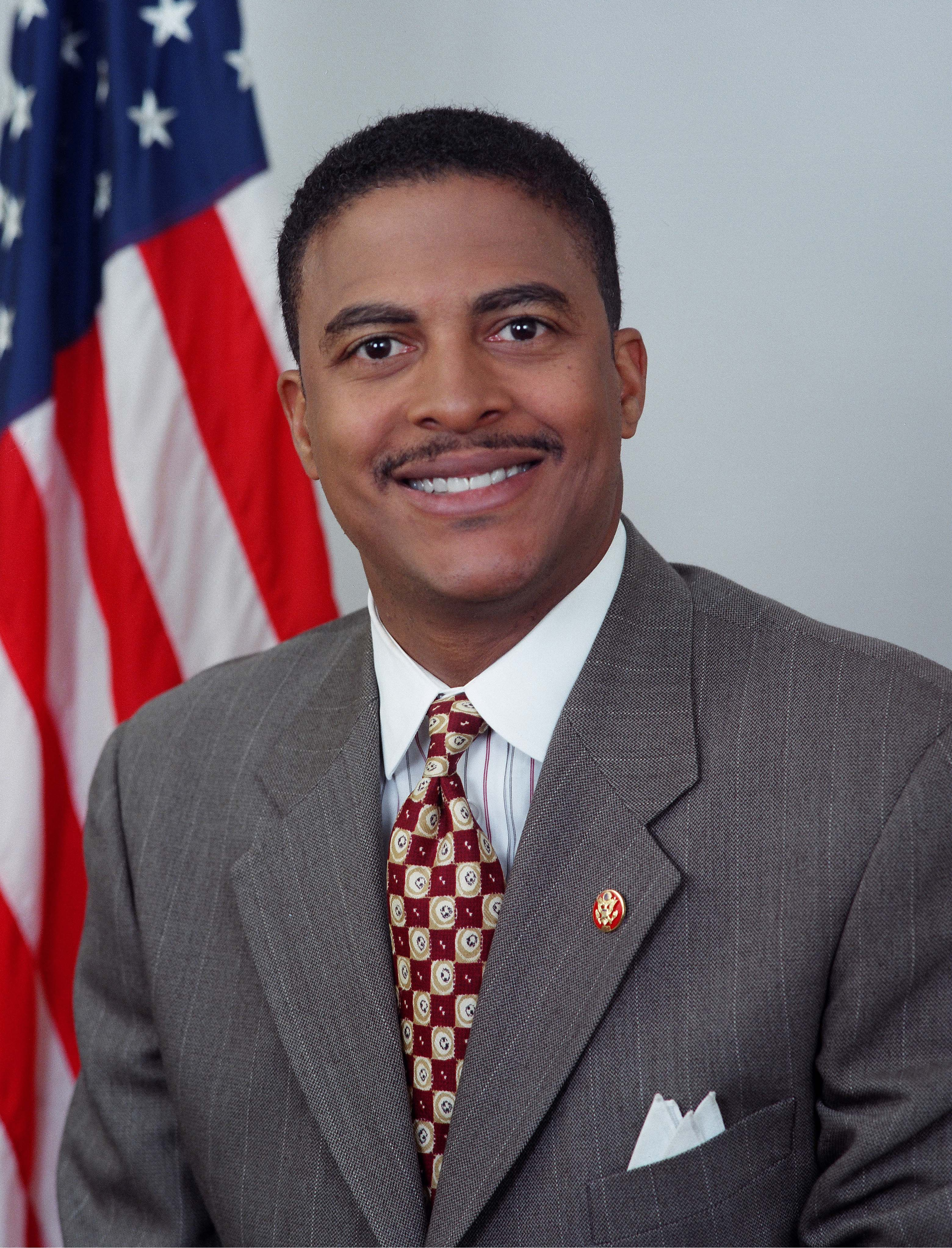
Mayor Tucker

| Mayor | Office | Crime(s) | Investigation | Notes |
|---|---|---|---|---|
| Hugh Joseph Addonizio | Mayor of Newark, New Jersey | Hobbs Act | | |
| Maurice B. Brown | Mayor of White Castle, Louisiana | Mail fraud, RICO, and Travel Act | Operation Blighted Officials | |
| Peter Cammarano | Mayor of Hoboken, New Jersey | Hobbs Act | Operation Bid Rig | |
| Buddy Cianci | Mayor of Providence, Rhode Island | RICO | Operation Plunder Dome | |
| David Delle Donna | Mayor of Guttenberg, New Jersey | Hobbs Act | | |
| Yvonne A. Dockery | Mayor of Garland, Arkansas | Mail fraud | | |
| Alex Daoud | Mayor of Miami Beach, Florida | | | |
| John de Rose | Mayor of Gloucester Township, New Jersey | | | |
| Dennis Elwell | Mayor of Secaucus, New Jersey | Program bribery | Operation Bid Rig | |
| Angelo Errichetti | Mayor of Camden, New Jersey | Federal official bribery, conspiracy to defraud the United States, and Travel Act | Abscam | |
| Joseph Ganim | Mayor of Bridgeport, Connecticut | Hobbs Act, mail fraud, program bribery, and RICO | | |
| Jerome P. Genova | Mayor of Calumet City, Illinois | Mail fraud, program bribery, and RICO | | |
| Oscar Hernandez | Mayor of Bell, California | | | |
| Richard S. Jackson | Mayor of Atlantic City, New Jersey | Hobbs Act | | |
| Sharpe James | Mayor of Newark, New Jersey | Mail fraud and program bribery | | |
| John C. Kubacki | Mayor of Reading, Pennsylvania | Hobbs Act and Travel Act | | |
| Larry Langford | Mayor of Birmingham, Alabama | Mail and wire fraud and program bribery | | |
| Theodore LeBlanc | Mayor of Norristown, Pennsylvania | Mail fraud and program bribery | | |
| John Lomelo | Mayor of Sunrise, Florida | Hobbs Act and mail fraud | | |
| Eddie Alexander Long | Mayor of Smithers, West Virginia | Mail fraud | | |
| Betty Loren-Maltese | Town President of Cicero, Illinois | Mail fraud and RICO | | |
| Edward Wayne Martin | Mayor of Warner Robins, Georgia | Hobbs Act | | |
| Raul L. Martinez | Mayor of Hialeah, Florida | Hobbs Act and RICO | | |
| Michael J. Matthews | Mayor of Atlantic City, New Jersey | Hobbs Act | | |
| Gerald McCann | Mayor of Jersey City, New Jersey | | | |
| Jack O. McNary | Mayor of Lansing, Illinois | Hobbs Act and RICO | | |
| Joseph Menna | Mayor of Gloucester Township, New Jersey | Hobbs Act | | |
| Milton Milan | Mayor of Camden, New Jersey | RICO | | |
| Emmanuel Onunwor | Mayor of East Cleveland, Ohio | RICO | | |
| Charles Panici | Mayor of Chicago Heights, Illinois | Hobbs Act, RICO, and program bribery | | |
| John Pomierski | Mayor of Upland, California | | | |
| Richard H. Prescott, Jr. | Mayor of Saraland, Alabama | Hobbs Act | | |
| Eddie Price III | Mayor of Mandeville, Louisiana | Mail fraud | | |
| Samuel Rivera | Mayor of Passaic, New Jersey | Hobbs Act | | |
| Anthony Russo | Mayor of Hoboken, New Jersey | Mail fraud | | |
| Steven Eugene Russo | Mayor of Orange Beach, Alabama | Mail fraud | | |
| Joseph J. Santopietro | Mayor of Waterbury, Connecticut | Program bribery | | |
| Brian J. Sarault | Mayor of Pawtucket, Rhode Island | Hobbs Act and RICO | | |
| David Silva | Mayor of Cudahy, California | | | |
| William T. Somers | Mayor of Atlantic City, New Jersey | Hobbs Act | | |
| Raymond O. Sopher | Mayor of Streator, Illinois | Hobbs Act | | |
| Walter R. Tucker III | Mayor of Compton, California | Hobbs Act | | |
| Thomas J. Whelan | Mayor of Jersey City, New Jersey | Hobbs Act | | |

== City council members ==
| City council member | Office | Crime(s) | Investigation | Notes |
|---|---|---|---|---|
| Robert Burke | Alderman of Holly Springs, Mississippi | Hobbs Act and Travel Act | | |
| George Bush, Sr. | Alderman of East St. Louis, Missouri | Hobbs Act | | |
| James Callaghan | Newark Councilman | Hobbs Act | | |
| Isaac Carothers | Chicago Alderman | | | |
| William Carothers | Chicago Alderman | Hobbs Act | | |
| Monica Conyers | Detroit City Council | Program bribery | | |
| Michael D'Amico | City Councillor of Quincy, Massachusetts | Hobbs Act | | |
| Wallace Davis | Chicago Alderman | Hobbs Act and RICO | Operation Incubator | |
| Walter J. Egan | City Council of Carson, California | Hobbs Act and mail fraud | | |
| Jesse Evans | Chicago Alderman | Hobbs Act, mail fraud, and RICO | Operation Silver Shovel | |
| Louis Farina | Chicago Alderman | Hobbs Act | | |
| Thomas Flaherty | Jersey City Council | Hobbs Act | | |
| Jack Foster | Alderman of Pine Bluff, Arkansas | Hobbs Act | | |
| Percy Giles | Chicago Alderman | Hobbs Act, mail fraud, and RICO | Operation Silver Shovel | |
| Arthur Gilmore, Jr. | Monroe City Council | Hobbs Act and RICO | | |
| John M. Gliottoni, Jr. | City Council Commissioner of Chicago Heights, Illinois | Hobbs Act and RICO | | |
| Patrick T. Hairston | Winston-Salem, North Carolina, Board of Aldermen | Hobbs Act, mail fraud, RICO, and Travel Act | | |
| John J. Hamilton, Jr. | Councilman of Asbury Park, New Jersey | Hobbs Act and program bribery | Operation Bid Rig | |
| Gwendolyn Cheek Hedgepeth | Richmond City Council | Hobbs Act and mail fraud | | |
| Fred Hubbard | Chicago Alderman | Program bribery | | |
| Marian Humes | Chicago Alderman | | | |
| Perry Hutchinson | Chicago Alderman | | | |
| Joseph Jambroni | Chicago Alderman | | | |
| Ralph Inzunza | San Diego City Council | Hobbs Act and mail fraud | | |
| Harry Jannotti | Philadelphia City Council | Hobbs Act | Abscam | |
| Ed Jew | San Francisco Board of Supervisors | Mail fraud, Hobbs Act, and program bribery | | |
| Louis Johanson | Philadelphia City Council | Federal official bribery, conspiracy to defraud the United States, and Travel Act | Abscam | |
| Jack B. Johnson | Prince George's County Council | Extortion and witness- and evidence-tampering | | |
| Leslie Johnson | Prince George's County Council | Conspiracy to commit witness- and evidence-tampering | | |
| Virgil Jones | Chicago Alderman | Hobbs Act | Operation Silver Shovel | |
| Thomas E. Keane | Chicago Alderman | Mail fraud | | |
| Clifford Kelley | Chicago Alderman | | | |
| Tyrone Kenner | Chicago Alderman | | | |
| Frank Kuta | Chicago Alderman | Hobbs Act | | |
| Acy L. Long | City Council of Saraland, Alabama | Hobbs Act | | |
| John Madryzk | Chicago Alderman | | | |
| Louise H. Marshall | City Council Commissioner of Chicago Heights, Illinois | Hobbs Act, RICO, and program bribery | | |
| Joseph Martinez | Chicago Alderman | | | |
| Miguel Martinez | New York City Council | Mail fraud | | |
| Joseph McClelland | Reno City Councilman | Hobbs Act | | |
| Michael McKenna | Alderman of Somerville, Massachusetts | Hobbs Act | | |
| Ambrosio Medrano | Chicago Alderman | Hobbs Act | Operation Silver Shovel | |
| Andrew K. Mirikitani | Honolulu City Council | Program bribery | | |
| Donald Mitchell | Gloucester Township Committeeman | | | |
| Raymond J. O'Grady | Township Committeeman of Middletown, New Jersey | Hobbs Act and program bribery | Operation Bid Rig | |
| Michael Orsburn | Trustee of Keener Township in Jasper County, Indiana | Mail fraud | | |
| Ricky Peete | Memphis City Council | Hobbs Act | | |
| Joseph Potempa | Chicago Alderman | | | |
| Angel Rodriguez | New York City Council | Hobbs Act | | |
| Fred Roti | Chicago Alderman | Hobbs Act and RICO | | |
| George X. Schwartz | Philadelphia City Council | Hobbs Act and RICO | Abscam | |
| Larry Seabrook | New York City Councilman | Mail and wire fraud | | |
| Edward Scholl | Chicago Alderman | | | |
| Harold D. Sheffield | City Council of Saraland, Alabama | Hobbs Act | | |
| Robert Cooper Smith | City Councilman of Fresno, California | Hobbs Act | | |
| Allan Streeter | Chicago Alderman | Hobbs Act | Operation Silver Shovel | |
| Robert E. Stevens | Monroe City Council | Hobbs Act and RICO | | |
| Casimir Staszcuk | Chicago Alderman | Hobbs Act and mail fraud | | |
| Shafter W. Summers | City Council of the City of Prichard, Alabama | Hobbs Act | | |
| Oliver Thomas | New Orleans City Council | Program bribery | | |
| Jesse E. Threlkeld | City Council of Saraland, Alabama | Hobbs Act | | |
| Arenda Troutman | Chicago Alderman | Mail fraud | | |
| Chuck Turner | Boston City Council | Hobbs Act | | |
| Edward Vrdolyak | Chicago Alderman | Mail and wire fraud | | |
| Robert Leslie Williams | City Council of Jackson, Mississippi | Hobbs Act and program bribery | | |
| Benjamin H. Woods | Pittsburgh City Council | Hobbs Act, RICO, and conspiracy to defraud the United States | | |
| Michael Zucchet | San Diego City Council | Hobbs Act and mail fraud | | |
| Stanley Zydlo | Chicago Alderman | | | |

== County executives and commissioners ==
| County commissioner | Office | Crime(s) | Investigation | Notes |
|---|---|---|---|---|
| John M. Beeler | Knox County, Tennessee Commissioner of Welfare | Hobbs Act | | |
| William T. Boston | County Commissioner of Major County, Oklahoma | Hobbs Act and mail fraud | | |
| Bernard Nettles Brown | County Commissioner of Bowie County, Texas | Hobbs Act and mail fraud | | |
| James J. Coyne, Jr. | Albany County Executive | Hobbs Act, mail fraud, and program bribery | | |
| Jimmy Dimora | Commissioner of Cuyahoga County, Ohio | RICO | | |
| A. Reginald Eaves | Fulton County Board of Commissioners | Hobbs Act | | |
| Charles Eugene Edwards | County Commissioner of Fannin County, Texas | Hobbs Act and mail fraud | | |
| John H. Evans, Jr. | Board of Commissioners of DeKalb County, Georgia | Hobbs Act | | |
| Joseph J. Forszt | Board of Commissioners of Lake County, Indiana | Hobbs Act and RICO | | |
| Gary A. Greenough | Board of Commissioners of Mobile, Alabama | Hobbs Act and mail and wire fraud | | |
| F. Lee Hyden | Shelby County Tennessee Board of Commissioners | Hobbs Act | | |
| Dario Herrera | Commissioner of Clark County, Nevada | Hobbs Act and wire fraud | Operation G-Sting | |
| Michael Hooks, Sr. | County Commissioner of Shelby County, Tennessee | Program bribery | Operation Tennessee Waltz | |
| Robert C. Janiszewski | County Executive of Hudson County, New Jersey | Hobbs Act | | |
| Jack B. Johnson | County Executive of Prince George's County, Maryland | | | |
| Erin Kenny | Commissioner of Clark County, Nevada | Wire fraud | Operation G-Sting | |
| Mary Kincaid-Chauncey | Commissioner of Clark County, Nevada | Hobbs Act and wire fraud | Operation G-Sting | |
| Joseph Kotvas | Hillsborough County Commission in Tampa, Florida | Hobbs Act, mail fraud, and RICO | | |
| Dean Shannon Loftus | Board of County Commissioners of Sarpy County, Nebraska | Hobbs Act | | |
| Lance Malone | Commissioner of Clark County, Nevada | RICO | Operation G-Sting | |
| Lester Millet | President of St. John the Baptist Parish, Louisiana | Hobbs Act. mail fraud, and Travel Act | | |
| Robert Rizzo | City Administrator for Bell, California | | | |
| Lamar Robinson | Supervisor for District Five, Harrison County, Mississippi | Hobbs Act | | |
| James J. Price | Chairman of the Charleston (South Carolina) County Council | Hobbs Act | | |
| Greg Skrepenak | Luzerne County Board of Commissioners | Program bribery | | |
| Garron Reginald Sorrow | Board of County Commissioners of Walton County, Georgia | Hobbs Act and conspiracy to defraud the United States | | |
| Frank A.J. Stodola | Board of Commissioners for Lake County, Indiana | Hobbs Act and RICO | | |
| Claude Tanner | Hillsborough County Commission in Tampa, Florida | Hobbs Act, mail fraud, and RICO | | |
| James W. Treffinger | County Executive of Essex County, New Jersey | Mail fraud | | |
| Martin Tuchow | Commissioner of Cook County | Hobbs Act | | |
| Trudie P. Westmoreland | County Supervisor of Perry County, Mississippi | Hobbs Act, mail fraud, and program bribery | | |
| Cullen H. Williams | Hillsborough County Commission in Tampa, Florida | Hobbs Act, mail fraud, and RICO | | |

== Judges ==
| State judge | Office | Crime(s) | Investigation | Notes |
|---|---|---|---|---|
| Dennis Adams | California Superior Court | Mail fraud and RICO | | |
| Leslie Anderson | County judge in Arkansas | Mail fraud, RICO, and Travel Act | | |
| Ronald D. Bodenheimer | Louisiana district judge | | | |
| William C. Brennan | New York Supreme Court, Queens County, Criminal Term | Hobbs Act, wire fraud, RICO, and Travel Act | | |
| Herbert R. Cain, Jr. | Philadelphia Common Pleas Court Judge | Hobbs Act | | |
| Bill R. Clark | County judge of Craighead County, Arkansas | RICO and Travel Act | | |
| Frank Dean | County judge of Poinsett County, Arkansas | RICO | | |
| John J. Devine | Cook County Circuit Judge | Hobbs Act, mail fraud, and RICO | Operation Greylord | |
| Mario Driggs | Philadelphia Municipal Court | Hobbs Act | | |
| Paul Foxgrover | Cook County Circuit Judge | | | |
| Daniel P. Glecier | Cook County Circuit Judge | RICO | Operation Greylord | |
| W. B. Hamilton | County Judge of St. Francis County, Arkansas | RICO | | |
| Kenneth S. Harris | Philadelphia Court of Common Pleas Judge | | | |
| Reginald Holzer | Cook County Circuit Judge | Hobbs Act, mail fraud, and RICO | Operation Greylord | |
| Richard F. LeFevour | Chief Judge of the Cook County traffic court | Mail fraud and RICO | Operation Greylord | |
| Thomas J. Maloney | Cook County Circuit Judge | Hobbs Act and RICO | Operation Greylord | |
| James Malkus | California Superior Court | Mail fraud and RICO | | |
| John M. McCollum | Cook County traffic court judge | | Operation Greylord | |
| Leonard Mooney | County judge in Arkansas | Mail fraud, RICO, and Travel Act | | |
| Fred M. Mosley | East Cleveland Municipal Court | Hobbs Act | | |
| John M. Murphy | Cook County Circuit Judge | Hobbs Act, mail fraud, and RICO | Operation Greylord | |
| Wayne Olson | Cook County Circuit Judge | | Operation Greylord | |
| John F. Reynolds | Cook County Circuit Judge | Mail fraud and RICO | Operation Greylord | |
| Jeffrey Sayre | Missouri | Hobbs Act | | |
| Carl Scacchetti | Judge of the City Court of Rochester | Hobbs Act | | |
| Harvey N. Shenberg | Dade County Court | Hobbs Act and RICO | Operation Court Broom | |
| David J. Shields | Chief Judge of the Chancery Division of the Circuit Court of Cook County | Hobbs Act and Travel Act | Operation Gambat | |
| Raymond Sodini | Cook County Circuit Judge | RICO | Operation Greylord | |
| Thomas J. Spargo | New York State Supreme Court Justice | | | |
| Adam N. Stillo, Sr. | Cook County Circuit Judge | Hobbs Act and RICO | Operation Greylord | |
| Walter W. Teel | Mississippi State Chancery Court Judge | Mail and wire fraud, program bribery, and RICO | | |
| John H. Whitfield | Mississippi State Circuit Court Judge | Mail and wire fraud, program bribery, and RICO | | |

== Other officials ==
| Mayor | Office | Crime(s) | Investigation | Notes |
|---|---|---|---|---|
| Gordon Fox | Vice-Chairman of the Providence, Rhode Island Board of Licenses | Wire fraud, bribery, and filing a false tax return | | |
| Gerald O'Leary | Boston School Committee member | Hobbs Act | | |

== See also ==
List of federal political scandals in the United States
