= List of 2000s American state and local politicians convicted of crimes =

This list includes American politicians at the state and local levels who have been convicted of felony crimes committed while in office by decade; this list encompasses the 2000s.

At the bottom of the article are links to related articles which deal with politicians who are involved in federal scandals (political and sexual), as well as differentiating among federal, state and local convictions. Also excluded are crimes which occur outside the politician's tenure in office unless they specifically stem from acts during his time of service.

Entries are arranged by date, from most current to less recent, and by state.

== Alabama ==
- Chairmen of the Alabama Democratic Party William B. Blount (D) pled guilty to federal bribery and conspiracy charges. (2008)
- State Representative Suzanne L. Schmitz (D) was found guilty on 7 out of 8 counts of federal fraud charges. (2009)
- State Senator Edward McClain (D) was convicted on 48 counts of money laundering, mail fraud, bribery and conspiracy. (2009)
- Governor of Alabama Don Siegelman (D) was found guilty of bribery, mail fraud and obstruction of justice on June 29, 2006, and sentenced to 88 months. (2006)

=== Local ===
- Jefferson County Commissioner Chris McNair (D) convicted of bribery (2006)
- Mayor of Birmingham Larry Langford (D) was sentenced on March 5, 2010, to 15 years in prison for conspiracy, bribery, fraud, money laundering, and filing false tax returns in connection with a long-running bribery scheme. (2010) He was also fined more than $119,000.

== Alaska ==
- Alaska political corruption probe in which VECO Corporation an oilfield service corporation, was investigated by the IRS, FBI and Department of Justice. Veco executives Bill Allen and VP Rick Smith pleaded guilty to federal charges of extortion, bribery, and conspiracy to impede the Internal Revenue Service. The charges involved bribing Alaska lawmakers who came to be known as the "Corrupt Bastards Club" to vote in favor of an oil tax law favored by VECO that was the subject of vigorous debate in 2006, and were part of a larger probe of political corruption in Alaska by federal authorities.
  1. State Representative Thomas Anderson (R), Found guilty of seven felony counts of extortion, bribery, conspiracy, and money laundering. Sentenced on October 15, 2007, to a term of 60 months in prison.
  2. State Representative Pete Kott (R), found guilty on three charges of bribery and sentenced to six years in prison and fined $10,000. (2007)
  3. State Representative Vic Kohring (R), convicted on November 1, 2007, of three counts of bribery by the Veco Corporation. In May 2008, he was sentenced to 3 1/2 years in prison.
  4. State Representative Bruce Weyhrauch (R), main charges dismissed by Supreme Court, given probation on state charges
  5. State Senator John Cowdery (R), pleaded guilty to lesser charges. (2009) Sentenced to six months' house arrest and a $25,000 fine.
  6. State Representative Beverly Masek (R), was sentenced to six months on September 23, 2009.

== Arizona ==
- Corporation Commissioner Jim Irvin (R) was found guilty of trying to influence a corporate bidding war and fined $60K. (2003)

== California ==
- State Senator Tom Berryhill (R) was found guilty of money laundering by Judge Jonathan Lew and the California Fair Practices Commission of deliberately trying to conceal, deceive or mislead the transfer of $40,000 to the Republican Central Committee of Stanislaus County and the Republican Central Committee of San Joaquin County, which then passed it to the campaign of Bill Berryhill, his brother, thus circumventing California's contribution limits of $3,600 per donation. (2008)
- State Senator Carole Migden (D) pled nolo contendere (no contest) to charges of reckless driving. She was ordered to pay a $710 fine and was sentenced to two years of probation. (2007)

=== Local ===
- Sheriff of Orange County Mike Carona (R) convicted of witness tampering. (2008)
- Member of the San Francisco Board of Supervisors Ed Jew (D), was sentenced to 64 months in federal prison for extortion, and a year in county jail for perjury. (2008)
- Member of San Diego City Council Ralph Inzunza (D) was convicted of corruption. (2005)

== Connecticut ==
- Governor of Connecticut John G. Rowland (R) was convicted of one-count of deprevation of honest services. (2004) He served ten months in a federal prison followed by four months' house arrest, ending in June 2006.
- State Treasurer of Connecticut Paul J. Silvester (R) was convicted of fraud. (2004)

=== Local ===
- Mayor of Bridgeport Joseph Ganim (D), was convicted of leveraging his position to receive kickbacks from city contractors for more than $500,000 in cash, meals, clothing, wine and home renovations. (2003)
- Mayor of Waterbury Philip Giordano (R) While investigating municipal corruption, the FBI discovered phone records and pictures of Giordano with a prostitute, as well as with her 10-year-old niece and her eight-year-old daughter. He was arrested on July 26, 2001, and, in March 2003, was convicted of 14 counts of using an interstate device, his cellphone, to arrange sexual contact with children. He was also convicted of violating the girls' civil rights. He was sentenced to 37 years in prison.

== Florida ==
- State Representative Bob Allen (R) was convicted of soliciting a sex act from an undercover police officer. (2007)
- State Senator Alberto Gutman (R), was convicted of corruption in a Medicare fraud scheme. Gutman, his wife and 23 others were sentenced to five years in federal prison, three years' probation and fined $50,000. (2000)

=== Local ===
- Sheriff of Broward County Ken Jenne (D) convicted of fraud. (2007)
- Mayor of Orlando Ernest Page (D) was convicted of bribery and official misconduct during a temporary stint as mayor. He was subsequently sentenced to 42 months in prison. (2006)

== Georgia ==
- State Senator Walter Ronnie Sailor Jr. (D) pled guilty to laundering money (2007)
- State Senator Charles Walker (D) convicted of charges including tax evasion, mail fraud and conspiracy (127 counts, in all). He was sentenced to 10 years. (2005)
- Schools Superintendent Linda Schrenko (R) sentenced to eight years in prison for embezzlement of federal education funds. (2004)
- State Representative Robin L. Williams (R) was convicted of campaign fraud. (2004)

=== Local ===
- Mayor of Atlanta Bill Campbell (D) convicted of tax evasion. (2006)
- Sheriff Sidney Dorsey (D) Convicted of arranging the murder of his runoff opponent and corruption. (2002)

== Hawaii ==
- State Representative Galen Fox (R) was convicted of sexual misconduct when he improperly touched a woman flying next to him. (2006)
- State Representative Nathan Suzuki (D) was found guilty of tax fraud. (2004)
- State Senator Marshall Ige (D) convicted of corruption. (2002)

== Illinois ==
- Governor of Illinois Rod Blagojevich (D) was charged with conspiracy to commit mail, wire fraud and solicitation of bribery. He was impeached and removed from office by 59–0 votes of the Illinois Senate. On August 17, 2010, he was convicted on just one of 24 federal charges. In a retrial in 2011, he was found guilty on 17 other counts and sentenced to 14 years in prison. (2011)
- Governor of Illinois George H. Ryan (R) was convicted of 18 counts of corruption and sentenced to six years and six months. (2006)
- State Representative Patricia Bailey (D) was convicted of perjury and fraud. (2005)

=== Local ===
- Alderman of Chicago Arenda Troutman (D) was convicted of bribery. (2005)
- Alderman of Chicago Edward Vrdolyak (D) was convicted of fraud. (2008)
- City Clerk of Chicago James Laski (D) was convicted of fraud. (2006)
- Mayor of Cicero, Betty Loren-Maltese (R) was convicted of an insurance fraud. She was sentenced to eight years in prison (2002)

== Indiana ==
- State Representative Dennie Oxley (D) convicted of impersonating a public servant. (2009)

=== Local ===
- City Clerk of Gary Katie Hall (D) pleaded guilty to mail fraud. (2003)

== Kansas ==
- State Representative Phil Hermanson (R) while being investigated, Hermanson pled guilty to a charge of driving under the influence of prescription drugs. (2009)

=== Local ===
- Shawn Brown (R) Mayor of St. Peters, pled guilty to charges he solicited and accepted bribes and was given 18-month sentence. (2006)

== Louisiana ==
- Congressman William Jefferson was found guilty on August 5, 2009, of eleven of the sixteen corruption counts. On November 13, 2009, Jefferson was sentenced to thirteen years, the longest sentence given to a congressman for bribery or any other crime.
- State Senator Derrick Shepherd (D), sentenced to 37 months for corruption. (2008)
- Governor of Louisiana Edwin Edwards (D) convicted of extortion, mail fraud and money laundering. (2000)
- Insurance Commissioner James H. "Jim" Brown (D) convicted of lying to FBI investigators. (2000)

== Massachusetts ==
- State Senator J. James Marzilli Jr. (D) pleaded guilty to all charges against him, including resisting arrest and disorderly conduct and was sentenced to three months in prison. (2008)
- State Senator Dianne Wilkerson (D) was video taped by the FBI stuffing bribe money into her bra. Wilkerson pleaded guilty to eight counts of attempted extortion. (2008)
- Speaker of the House Thomas Finneran (D) pleaded guilty to one count of obstruction of justice and received 18 months' probation. (2004)

== Maryland ==
- State Senator Thomas L. Bromwell (D) was sentenced to seven years in prison for racketeering, corruption and fraud to benefit construction company Poole and Kent. (2007)
- State Delegate Robert A. McKee (R) pleaded guilty to possession of child pornography and was sentenced to a 37-month term. (2006)

== Michigan ==
- State Representative Kevin Green (R) pleaded guilty to driving while impaired by alcohol. (2008)

=== Local ===
- Detroit City Councillor Monica Conyers (D) pleaded guilty to conspiring to commit bribery and served just over 27 months at the Alderson Federal Prison Camp in West Virginia. (2009)

== Missouri ==
- State Senator Jeff Smith (D) convicted of two counts of obstruction of justice. He was sentenced to one year and a day of prison and was fined $50,000. (2009)
- State Representative Nathan Cooper (R) convicted on two felony counts of immigration fraud. (2007)

== Nebraska ==
- State Treasurer Lorelee Byrd (R) pleaded guilty to one misdemeanor charge of misconduct. (2003)
- State Senator Ray Mossey (R) was found guilty and pled no contest to prescription drug charges and was sentenced to two years' probation. He was also sentenced to one year's probation for drunken driving when Mossey's blood-alcohol level tested at twice the legal limit. In addition, he was fined $14,000 for using campaign finance funds to pay an online dating service and a tattoo parlor. (2005)
- Regent David Hergert (R) of the University of Nebraska was arrested soon after his election for violating campaign finance laws. He pled guilty to false reporting and obstruction and was sentenced to five years' probation and fined $654,000 (2005)

== Nevada ==
- State Controller Kathy Augustine (R) was impeached and convicted of using state personnel and property for her re-election campaign, but not removed from office. She was fined $15,000. (2004)
- State Representative Brent Parker (R) pleaded guilty to soliciting sex from a male undercover police officer. He was ordered to attend a 10-week therapy class or face up to 180 days in jail. (2003)

=== Local ===
- Operation G-Sting or Strippergate was an FBI probe into bribes taken by County Commissioners in Clark County, Nevada and City Council members in San Diego, California. It was the result of strip club owners Rick Rizzolo and Mike Galardi trying to remove a "no touch" law affecting the girls in their clubs. The investigation resulted in the convictions of 17 defendants including:
1. Clark County Commissioner Lynette Boggs McDonald (R) pled no contest to filing a false statement and campaign funding irregularities (2009)
2. Clark County Commissioner Mary Kincaid-Chauncey (D) was sentenced to 30 months in federal prison, fined $7,600 and ordered to forfeit $19,000 in assets (2006)
3. Clark County Commissioner Dario Herrera (D) was sentenced to 50 months in federal prison, fined $15,000 and ordered to forfeit $60,000 in assets (2006)
4. Clark County Commissioner Erin Kenny (D) was sentenced to 2 1/2 years in prison (2006)
5. Clark County Commissioner Lance Matthew Malone (R) pleaded guilty to violating federal racketeering laws for bribing commissioners(2006)

== New Jersey ==
- New Jersey Operation Bid Rig: An FBI sting operation indicted 44 New Jersey officials and several Rabbis, mainly for bribery, counterfeiting of intellectual property, money laundering, organ harvesting, and political corruption. Arrested were:
  1. Assemblyman Daniel M. Van Pelt (R) Resigned after indictment for bribery.
  2. State Senator Wayne R. Bryant (D) was convicted of bribery. (2007)
  3. State Senator Joseph Coniglio (D) indicted for abusing state grants, mail fraud and extortion. (2008)
  4. State Senator Sharpe James (D) On April 16, 2008, James was convicted of five counts of fraud by a federal jury. On July 29, 2008, he was sentenced by Judge William J. Martini to 27 months in prison.
- State Senator John A. Lynch Jr. (D) convicted of mail fraud and tax evasion. (2006)
- Assemblyman Anthony Impreveduto (D) convicted of corruption. (2004)

=== Local ===
- New Jersey Operation Bid Rig:
  1. Mayor of Hoboken Peter Cammarano (D) was convicted of corruption. (2009)
  2. Mayor of Secaucus Dennis Elwell (D) was convicted of corruption. (2009)
  3. Commissioner and Chairwoman of the Jersey City Housing Authority Lori Serrano (D) was convicted of corruption. (2009)
- Mayor of Passaic Samuel Rivera (D) convicted of extortion. Rivera was sentenced to 21 months in prison. (2008)
- County Executive of Hudson County Robert C. Janiszewski (D) was convicted of bribery. (2005)
- Chief Executive of Essex County James W. Treffinger (R) was convicted of corruption and fraud and ordered to pay $30,000 in restitution and serve 13 months in jail. (2003)
- Mayor of Camden Milton Milan (D) was convicted of corruption. (2000)
- Mayor of Marlboro Matthew Scannapieco (R) pled guilty to tax evasion and corruption involving $245K in bribes paid by a real estate developer (2005)

== New Mexico ==
- State Treasurer Robert Virgil (D) was found guilty of corruption and sentenced to 37 months in prison and fined $97,000. (2007)
- State Treasurer Michael Montoya (D) was found guilty of corruption and sentenced to 40 months in prison and a $40,000 fine. (2007)
- State Senator Manny Aragon (D) was found guilty of attempting to defraud the construction project of the Bernalillo County Metropolitan Courthouse in Albuquerque, and was sentenced to over 5 years in federal prison. (2009)

== New York ==
- State Health Commissioner Antonia Novello (R) pled guilty to misuse of staff by spending $48,000 of public money making them carry out her personal chores, such as taking her shopping and picking up her dry cleaning. She was convicted and ordered to perform 250 hours of community service, pay $22,500 in restitution plus a $5,000 fine. (2009)
- State Senator Kevin Parker (D) was charged with felony assaulting and menacing and two misdemeanor counts of criminal mischief for attacking a New York Post photographer. He was found guilty and served three years' probation for the misdemeanors but was acquitted of the felony charge. (2009)
- State Assemblyman Anthony Seminerio (D) pleaded guilty to taking large sums of money from hospitals through a consulting firm while still a member of the New York State Assembly. His appeal was never heard but his conviction was abated due to death. (2009)
- Supreme Court Justice Thomas J. Spargo (R), was convicted by a federal jury of attempted extortion and attempted soliciting of a bribe for pressuring a lawyer to give $10,000 to his defense fund. (2009)
- State Senator Efrain Gonzalez (D) was sentenced to 84 months (7 years) in prison, followed by two years' supervised release, following pleading guilty to two conspiracy counts and two wire fraud counts. (2009)
- State Assemblyman Brian McLaughlin (D) was arrested in 2008 and sentenced to ten years in prison for racketeering. (2009)
- State Senator Hiram Monserrate (D), convicted of one count of misdemeanor assault, and acquitted of two counts of felony assault and one other count of misdemeanor assault. (2009)
- State Senator Diane Gordon (D) was convicted of receiving bribes. (2008)
- State Assemblyman Chris Ortloff (R) while serving on the State Parole Board, pleaded guilty to a felony charge of online enticement of minors. He was sentenced to 150 months in federal prison (2008)
- Supreme Court Justice Gerald Garson (D) was sentenced to 3.5 to 10 years in prison for accepting expensive gifts in exchange for fixing divorce cases. (2005)
- State Assemblyman Clarence Norman Jr. (D) was sentenced to nine years in jail for falsifying records. (2005)
- State Assemblywoman Gloria Davis (D) was sentenced to 90 days in jail and five years' probation for bribery. (2003)
- State Senator Guy Velella (R) was indicted for bribery and conspiracy for accepting at least $137,000 in exchange for steering public-works contracts to the paying parties. He ultimately pleaded guilty to one count and received a year in jail. He served 182 days. (2002)

=== Local ===
- New York City Councillor Miguel Martinez (D) pleaded guilty to three counts of conspiracy two days later. He admitted to stealing $106,000 that was for children's art programs and low-income housing. He was convicted on three felonies, and was sentenced to five years in prison. (2009)
- NY City Councilman Dennis P. Gallagher (R) resigned from office and pleaded guilty to sexually abusing a woman in his district office while he was intoxicated. (2007)

== North Carolina ==
- State Representative James B. Black (D) pleaded guilty to a federal charge of public corruption and was sentenced to five years in prison. (2007)
- State Representative Paul Miller (D), was sentenced to a year's probation and fined $1,000 for fraud. (2006)
- Commissioner of Agriculture Meg Scott Phipps (D) pleaded guilty to campaign finance charges and served three years in prison. (2003)
- State Representative Michael P. Decker (R) pleaded guilty to one count of conspiracy to commit extortion, honest services mail fraud, and money laundering. Decker, a Republican, solicited Democrats and agreed to accept $50,000 and other gifts in return for switching parties. (2002)
- State Representative Thomas Wright (R), was found guilty of three counts of felony fraud. He was sentenced to 6 to 8 years(2007)

=== Local ===
- Cabarrus County Commissioner Coy C. Privette, (R) pled guilty to aiding and abetting prostitution. (2007)

== Northern Marianas Islands ==
- Lieutenant Governor of the Northern Mariana Islands Timothy Villagomez (CP) was sentenced to 87 months in federal prison for misuse of government funds. (2009)
- Northern Marianas Islands Commerce Secretary James A. Santos (R) was sentenced to 87 months in prison for misuse of government funds. (2009)

== Oklahoma ==
- State Auditor and Inspector Jeff McMahan (D) convicted of accepting bribes. (2008)
- Insurance Commissioner Carroll Fisher (D) convicted for corruption and sentenced to 14 months. (2006)
- State Senator Gene Stipe (D) pleaded guilty to federal charges of perjury, conspiracy to obstruct a Federal Election Commission investigation, and conspiracy to violate the Federal Election Campaign Act. (2003)

== Ohio ==
- Governor of Ohio Bob Taft (R) pleads no contest and is convicted on four misdemeanor ethics violations. He was fined $4,000 and ordered to apologize to the people of Ohio. (2005)

== Oregon ==
- State Representative Dan Doyle (R) resigned from office and was sentenced to 10 months in jail for finance violations. (2005)
- State Senator John Mabrey (R) was convicted of felony theft in a case of insurance fraud. (2002)

== Pennsylvania ==
- State Senator Vince Fumo (D) was found guilty of 139 counts of mail fraud, wire fraud, conspiracy, obstruction of justice and filing a false tax return. Two staffers were also arrested and indicted on charges of destroying electronic evidence, including e-mail related to the investigation. (2009)
- Secretary of Revenue of Pennsylvania Stephen Stetler (D) sentenced to 1 1/2–5 years in prison, fined $35,000, order to pay $466,621 restitution for multiple corruption convictions. (2009)
- State Representative Milton Street (D) convicted of tax evasion and was sentenced to serve 30 months in prison. (2008) Street appealed, but his conviction was affirmed by the Third Circuit Court of Appeals.
- State Representative Linda Bebko-Jones (D) and her chief-of-staff were charged with forging some of the signatures on their nominating petitions. They were both sentenced to 12 months' probation and fined $1,500 with community service. (2007)
- State Representative & Democratic Whip of the Pennsylvania House of Representatives Mike Veon (D), convicted of misusing state funds and sentenced to 6–14 years in jail. (2007)
- State Representative and Democratic Leader of the Pennsylvania House of Representatives Bill DeWeese (D) found guilty of five of the six felony counts with which he was charged and sentenced to 30–60 months. (2007)
- State Representative Jeffrey Habay (R) was convicted of 21 counts of harassment, solicitation for perjury and intimidation. (2007)
- State Representative Frank LaGrotta (D) pleaded guilty to two counts of corruption for giving away $26,000 of state funds in the 2006 Pennsylvania General Assembly bonus controversy. Sentenced to six months' house arrest, probation, and fines. (2007)
- State Representative R. Tracy Seyfert (R) pleaded guilty to Theft of Federal Property by acquiring a $160,000-dollar, 10 ton generator for her own use if the power grid had failed on the Millennium. She was sentenced to six months in federal prison and assessed a $5,000 fine. (2001)
- State Representative Thomas W. Druce (R) was convicted in 2000 of a 1999 hit and run that killed a man. (2000)
- State Senator Bill Slocum (R) pleaded guilty to six criminal misdemeanor charges for filing false reports to the Pennsylvania Department of Environmental Protection and discharging 3.5 million gallons of raw sewage into Brokenstraw Creek while he was a sewage plant manager in Youngsville, Pennsylvania. (2000)
- State Representative Frank Gigliotti (D) was convicted and sentenced in 2000 to 46 months' incarceration for extortion, mail fraud, and filing a false income tax return. (2000)
- State Representative Jeffrey Habay (R) was found guilty on December 12, 2005, of conflict of interest. he resigned and was sentenced to 6 to 12 months of prison followed by four years of probation.
- State Senator F. Joseph Loeper (R) pleaded guilty in federal court of falsifying tax-related documents to conceal more than $330,000 in income he received from a private consulting firm while serving in the Senate. He resigned his senate seat on December 31, 2000, and was later released from federal prison at Fort Dix, New Jersey, after serving six months. (2000)

=== Local ===
- President Judge of the Luzerne County Court of Common Pleas Mark Ciavarella (D) sentenced to 28 years in federal prison for his involvement in the kids for cash scandal. (2009)
- Senior Judge Michael Conahan (D) sentenced to 17 1/2 years in federal prison for his involvement in the Kids for cash scandal. (2009)
- Wrightsville Borough Councillor Fred Smeltzer (R) pleaded no contest to rape and was sentenced to six months in prison. (2005)

== Puerto Rico ==
- Speaker of the House Edison Misla Aldarondo (R) was convicted of extortion, money laundering and witness tampering and sentenced to 71 months in prison. See sex scandals. (2007)
  1. Jose Omar Cruz-Mercado was the Associate Secretary of the Puerto Rico Department of Education when he aided an extortion and kickback scheme that involved fraudulent payments of more than $4.3 million in cash and property from PRDE contractors.
  2. Deputy Secretary of State Angel Ocasio Ramos received 18 months in prison for making illegal payments to Rangel in exchange for government contracts.
- Puerto Rico Senator Freddy Valentin (PNP) was indicted on 44 counts including fraud, money laundering, and extortion in December 2002. He plead guilty to attempted bribery and misappropriation of funds, three counts each, in February 2004. His plea agreement and cooperation in other cases resulted in an 18–month sentence with six years probation. (2002)

== Rhode Island ==
- State Representative and House Majority Leader Gerard M. Martineau (D) was given 37 months in prison for influence peddling in Operation Dollar Bill. (2008)
- State Senator John A. Celona (D) was found guilty of accepting $320,000 in bribes from the Roger Williams Medical Center and Blue Cross & Blue Shield of Rhode Island. He was sentenced to 30 months in prison. (2007)
- State Representative Thomas W. Pearlman (R) was charged with fee-gouging and providing incompetent counsel. He was found guilty of misconduct, suspended and ordered to pay restitution. (2004)

=== Local ===
- Mayor of Providence Buddy Cianci (R). His first administration ended in 1984 when he pleaded guilty to assault. His second stint as mayor ended when he was forced to resign following his conviction for racketeering conspiracy named Operation Plunder Dome served four years in federal prison.

== South Carolina ==
- State Treasurer Thomas Ravenel (R) convicted on cocaine charges. (2007)
- State Senator Charles Tyrone "Ty" Courtney (R) was convicted of bank fraud, mail fraud and making false statements on a loan application. (2000)
- Agriculture Commissioner Charles Sharpe (R) was found guilty of charges of extortion, money laundering and lying to federal investigators, stemming from an illegal cockfighting ring. He served two years in prison. (2004)

== South Dakota ==
- State Representative Ted Klaudt (R) was found guilty on all four counts of second-degree rape as well as witness tampering. He was sentenced to 54 years in prison. (2008)

== Tennessee ==
- Operation Tennessee Waltz: an FBI sting operation between 2003 and 2007 in which a number of state and local representatives were arrested including;
  1. State Senator John Ford (D) Sentenced to 66 months for bribery.
  2. State Senator Kathryn Bowers (D) pleaded guilty to one count of bribery.
  3. State Senator Ward Crutchfield (D) pleaded guilty to one count of bribery.
  4. State Senator Roscoe Dixon (D) pleaded guilty to bribery
  5. State Representative J. Chris Newton (R) pleaded guilty to bribery.
- State Representative Ronald 'Ronnie' Davis (R) pled guilty to four felony charges of conspiring to sell fake passports and to supplying drugs to his girlfriend (2002)

=== Local ===
- Tax Assessor of Putnam County Byron Looper (R), was convicted of the murder of State Senator Tommy Burks (D). (2000)
- Juvenile Court Judge, Darrell Catron (R) was found guilty of corruption and sentenced to 18 months' probation. (2007)

== Utah ==
- State Representative Brent Parker (R) pleaded guilty to soliciting sex from a male undercover police officer. (2003)
- Ray M. Harding Jr. (R) Judge of the 3rd State District, was found guilty of possession of cocaine and heroin and sentenced to 120 days in jail, 2 years' probation, community service and fined. (2002)
- E. Ozwald Balfour (R) Member of the Republican State Central Committee and founder of the Utah Republican Black Assembly, was found guilty of four counts of sexual abuse and was sentenced to 90 days in jail. (2004)

== Virginia ==
- State Secretary of Finance John Forbes (R) was sentenced to 10 years in prison after he admitted embezzling $4 million in tobacco-region economic development money. He was sentenced to 120 months in prison (2009)
- State Delegate Fenton Bland (D) pleaded guilty to one count of conspiracy to commit bank fraud; sentenced to 57 months in prison and ordered to pay $1.2 million in restitution (2005)
- State Republican Party Director Edmund Matricardi III (R) pled guilty to one count of interception of a wire communication by illegally eavesdropping on a protected Democratic phone call. During sentencing Matricardi was forced to resign, spend three years on probation and fined $10,000. (2003)

== West Virginia ==
- State Representative Lisa D. Smith (R) pleaded guilty to one count of mail fraud and one count of mail fraud. She was sentenced to two years in prison, three years of probation and fined $1,000,000.

== Wisconsin ==
- State Assemblyman Scott Jensen (R) convicted of misuse of public workers. (2006)
- State Assemblyman Steven Foti (R) convicted of ethics violations. (2006)
- State Senator Gary George (D) was convicted of fraud. (2004)
- State Assemblywoman Bonnie Ladwig (R) convicted of ethics violations. (2004)
- State Senator Brian Burke (D) was sentenced to six months in county jail for misconduct in office and obstructing an officer for using state workers for his campaign. (2003)
- State Senator Charles Chvala (D) sentenced to serve nine months in prison for campaign violations including coordination violations. (2002)

== See also ==
- List of federal political scandals in the United States
- List of federal political sex scandals in the United States

Federal politicians:

- List of American federal politicians convicted of crimes
- List of United States representatives expelled, censured, or reprimanded
- List of United States senators expelled or censured
- List of 2010s American state and local politicians convicted of crimes
- List of 2020s American state and local politicians convicted of crimes
