= List of United States crime-related lists =

This is a list of lists related to crime in the United States.

== Criminals and suspected criminals ==
=== Individuals ===
- FBI Ten Most Wanted Fugitives
  - Former FBI Ten Most Wanted Fugitives
- List of American mobsters of Irish descent
- List of Depression-era outlaws
- List of Italian-American mobsters
- List of Jewish American mobsters
- List of Old West gunfighters
- List of serial killers in the United States
- List of United States federal officials convicted of corruption offenses
- List of United States local officials convicted of federal corruption offenses
- List of United States state officials convicted of federal corruption offenses
- List of United States unincorporated territory officials convicted of federal corruption offenses

=== Groups ===
- List of California street gangs
- List of criminal gangs in Los Angeles
- List of gangs in the United States
- List of Italian Mafia crime families § United States
- List of Old West gangs

== Crimes ==
- Mass shootings in the United States § Deadliest mass shootings since 1949
- List of 2012 murders in the United States
- List of incidents of civil unrest in the United States
- List of mass shootings in the United States
- List of school shootings in the United States (before 2000)
- List of school shootings in the United States (2000-present)
- List of shootings in Colorado
- List of United States presidential assassination attempts and plots
- List of train robberies in the United States
- Terrorism in the United States §§ By date and By type

== Victims ==
- List of American police officers killed in the line of duty
- List of journalists killed in the United States
- List of lynching victims in the United States
- List of murdered American children

== Statistics ==
- Gun violence in the United States by state
- List of U.S. states by homicide rate
- List of U.S. states by incarceration and correctional supervision rate
- List of United States cities by crime rate (population 250,000+)
  - United States cities by crime rate (100,000–250,000)
  - United States cities by crime rate (60,000–100,000)
  - United States cities by crime rate (40,000–60,000)

== Other ==
- List of deaths and violence at the Cecil Hotel
- List of detention sites in the United States
- List of killings by law enforcement officers in the United States
- List of punishments for murder in the United States
- Lists of people executed in the United States
- List of U.S. criminal justice academics
- List of U.S. military prisons
- List of United States federal prisons
- Lists of United States state prisons
- Overturned convictions in the United States
