= List of United States unincorporated territory officials convicted of federal corruption offenses =

This is a list of notable United States unincorporated territory officials convicted of federal public corruption offenses for conduct while in office. The list is organized by office. Non-notable officials, such as sewer inspectors and zoning commissioners, are not included on this list, although they are routinely prosecuted for the same offenses. Acquitted officials are not listed (if an official was acquitted on some counts, and convicted on others, the counts of conviction are listed). Officials convicted of territorial crimes are not listed.

The criminal statute(s) under which the conviction(s) were obtained are noted. If a defendant is convicted of a conspiracy to commit a corruption offense, the substantive offense is listed. Convictions of non-corruption offenses, such as making false statements, perjury, obstruction of justice, electoral fraud, and campaign finance regulations, even if related, are not noted. Nor are derivative convictions, such as tax evasion or money laundering. Officials convicted only of non-corruption offenses are not included on this list, even if indicted on corruption offenses as well. Certain details, including post-conviction relief, if applicable, are included in footnotes.

The Hobbs Act (enacted 1934), the mail and wire fraud statutes (enacted 1872), including the honest services fraud provision, the Travel Act (enacted 1961), the Racketeer Influenced and Corrupt Organizations Act (RICO) (enacted 1970), and the federal program bribery statute, 18 U.S.C. § 666 (enacted 1984), have been used to prosecute of such officials. These statutes are also applicable to corrupt federal, state, and local officials. The Ninth Circuit has held that the program bribery statute does not apply to Guam.

== Guam ==
Official	Office	Crime(s)	Notes
Katherine Bordallo Aguon	Director of the Department of Education of Guam	Hobbs Act	
Ricardo Bordallo	Governor of Guam	Hobbs Act and program bribery	
Joseph Soriano	Director of the Department of Parks and Recreation of Guam	Hobbs Act and mail fraud	

== Northern Marianas Islands ==
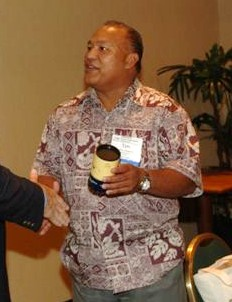
Lieutenant Governor Villagomez

Official	Office	Crime(s)	Notes
James A. Santos	Commerce Secretary of the Northern Marianas Islands	Wire fraud, program bribery, and conspiracy to defraud the United States	
Timothy Villagomez	Lieutenant Governor of the Northern Mariana Islands	Wire fraud, program bribery, and conspiracy to defraud the United States	

== Puerto Rico ==
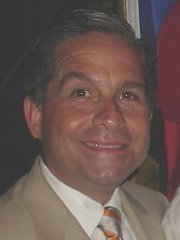
Puerto Rico Senator Jorge de Castro Font

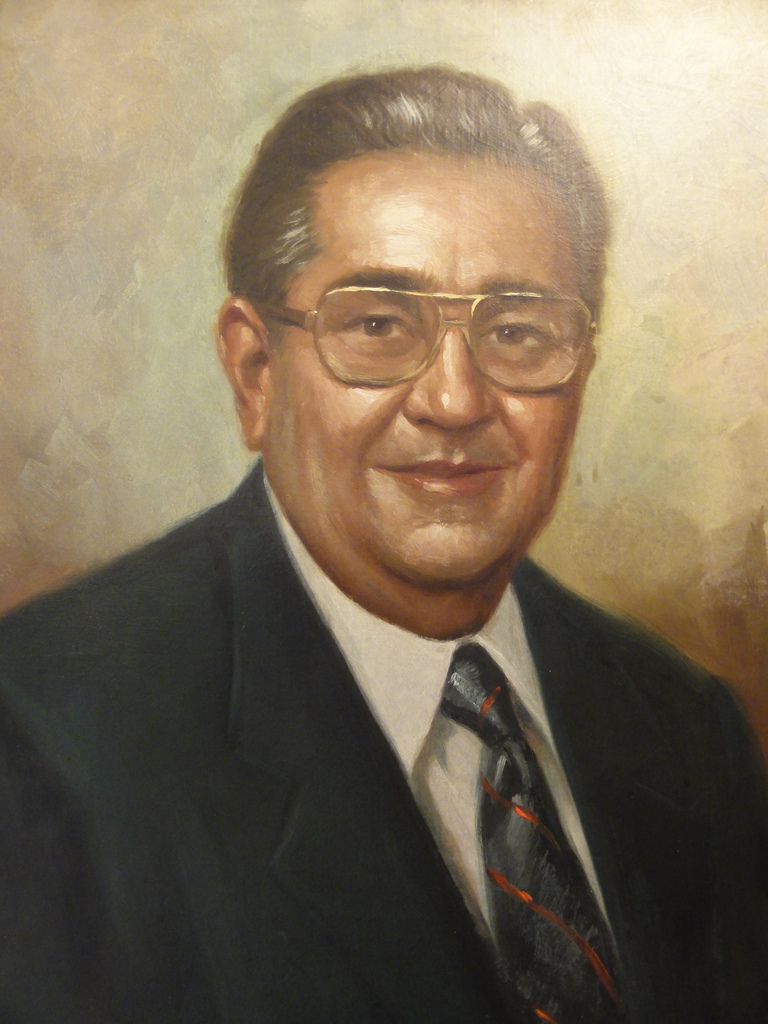
Mayor José G. Tormos Vega

Official	Office	Crime(s)	Notes
Liborio Ruben Caro-Muñiz	Mayor of Rincón, Puerto Rico	Program bribery	
Juan Manuel Cruzado Laureano	Mayor of Vega Alta, Puerto Rico	Hobbs Act and program bribery	
Jorge de Castro Font	Puerto Rico senator	Hobbs Act and mail fraud	
Victor Fajardo-Velez	Secretary of the Puerto Rico Department of Education	Hobbs Act	
José Granados	Speaker of the Puerto Rico House of Representatives		
Héctor Martínez Maldonado	Puerto Rico senator	Program bribery	
Edison Misla Aldarondo	Speaker of the Puerto Rico House of Representatives	Hobbs Act	
Angel E. Rodriguez-Cabrera	Mayor of Toa Alta, Puerto Rico	Program bribery	
José G. Tormos Vega	Mayor of Ponce, Puerto Rico	Hobbs Act	
Freddy Valentín	Puerto Rico senator	Hobbs Act	

== See also ==
List of federal political scandals in the United States
