= List of United States state officials convicted of federal corruption offenses =

This is a list of notable U.S. state officials convicted of only certain federal public corruption offenses for conduct while in office. The list is organized by office. Acquitted officials are not listed (if an official was acquitted on some counts, and convicted on others, the counts of conviction are listed). Officials convicted of state crimes are not listed.

For a more complete list see: List of American state and local politicians convicted of crimes.

The criminal statute(s) under which the conviction(s) were obtained are noted, as are the names of notable investigations or scandals, if applicable. If a defendant is convicted of a conspiracy to commit a corruption offense, the substantive offense is listed.

Criminal convictions such as making false statements, perjury, obstruction of justice, electoral fraud, and campaign finance regulations, tax evasion, and money laundering even if related, are not included in this list.

Certain details, including post-conviction relief, if applicable, are included in footnotes. For example, several officials obtained post-conviction relief after the Supreme Court's decisions narrowing the mail fraud statute in McNally v. United States (1987) and Skilling v. United States (2010) and narrowing the Hobbs Act in McCormick v. United States (1991).

The Hobbs Act (enacted 1934), the mail and wire fraud statutes (enacted 1872), including the honest services fraud provision, the Travel Act (enacted 1961), the Racketeer Influenced and Corrupt Organizations Act (RICO) (enacted 1970), and the federal program bribery statute, 18 U.S.C. § 666 (enacted 1984), permit the prosecution of such officials. These statutes are also applicable to corrupt federal officials. In addition, federal officials are subject to the federal bribery, graft, and conflict-of-interest crimes contained in Title 18, Chapter 11 of the United States Code, 18 U.S.C. §§ 201–227, which do not apply to state and local officials.

== Governors ==
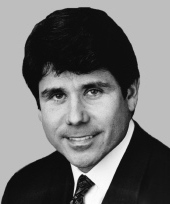
Gov. Blagojevich

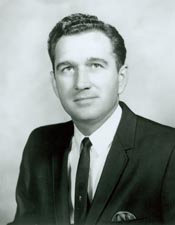
Gov. Blanton

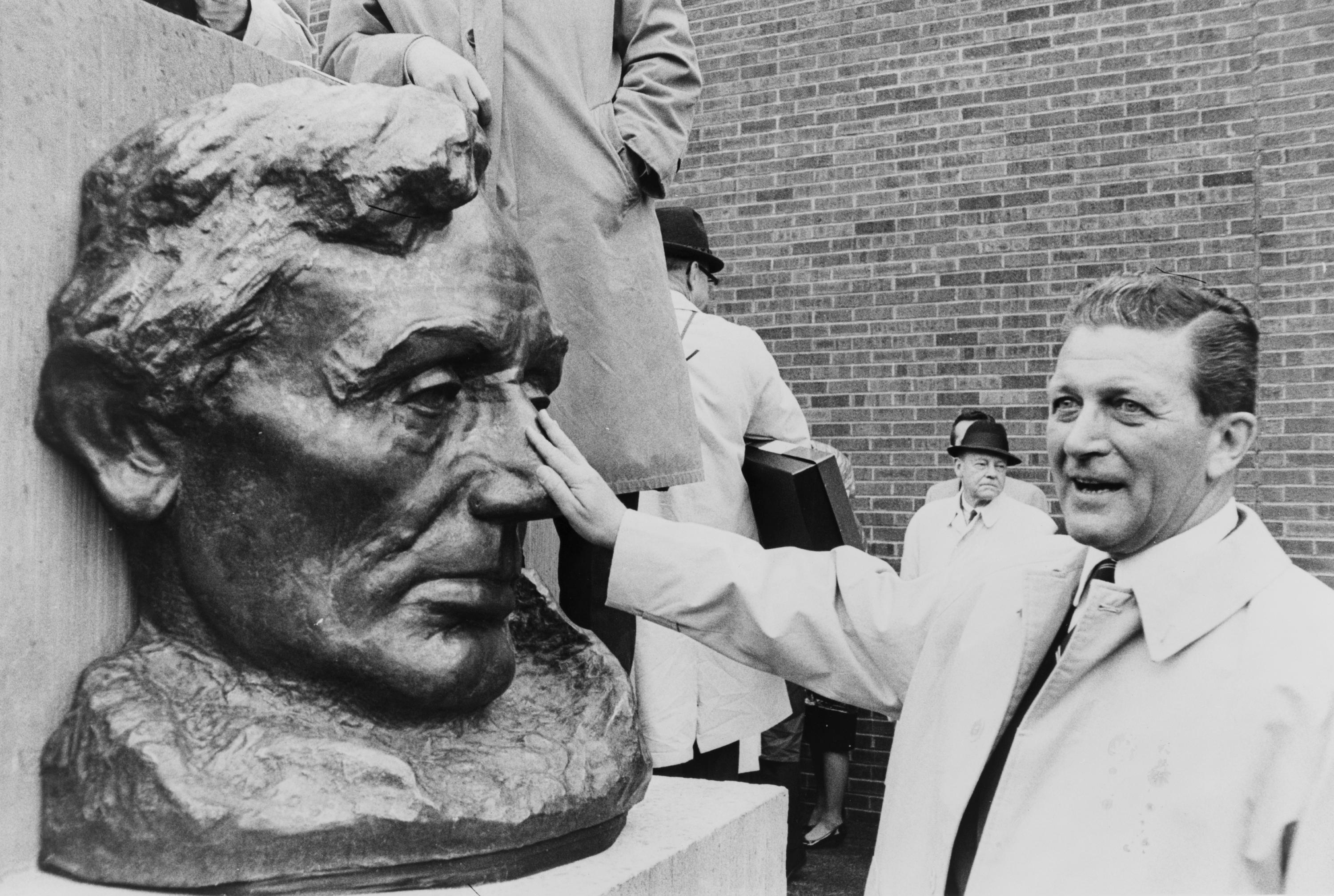
Gov. Kerner

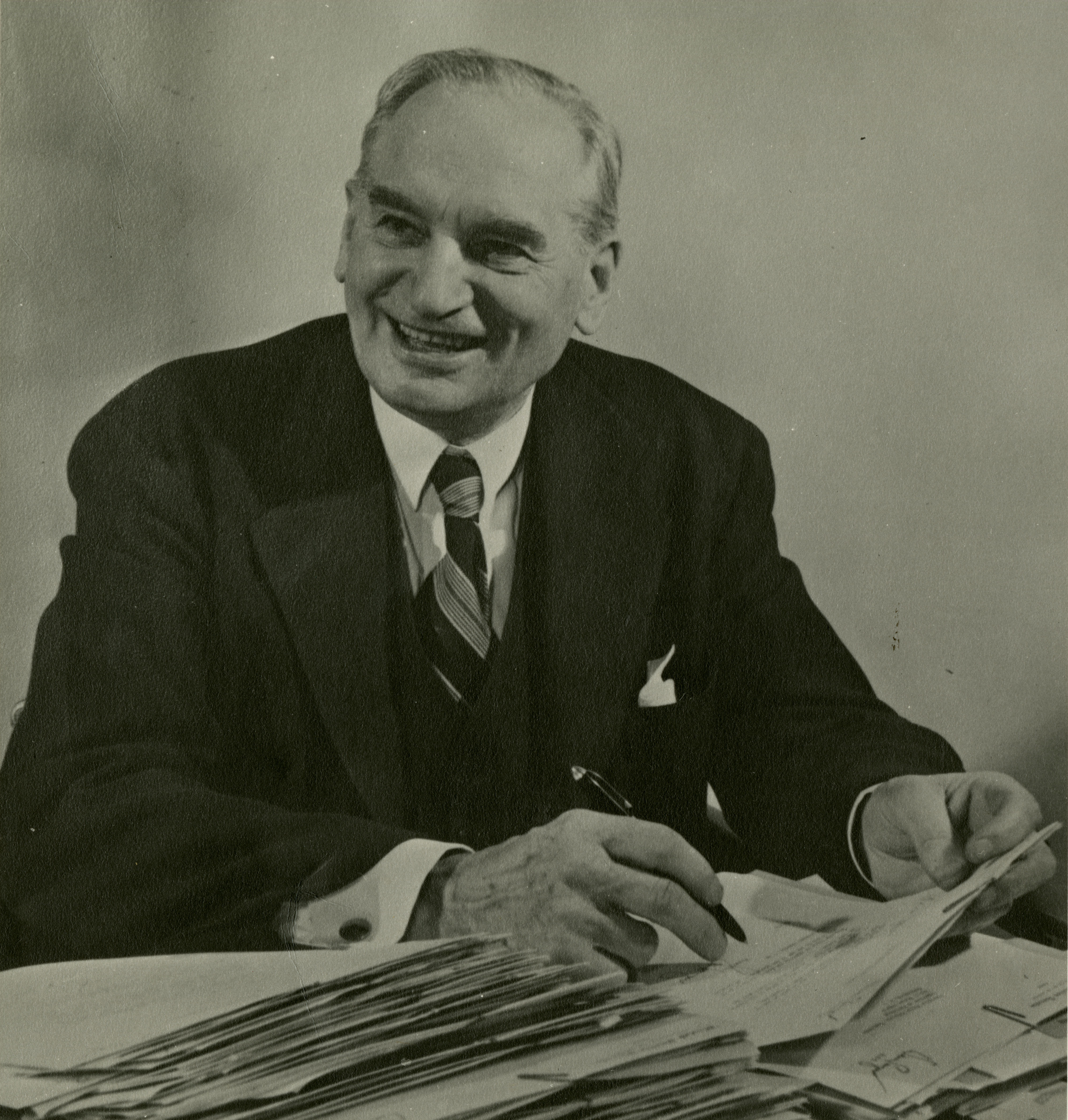
Gov. Langer

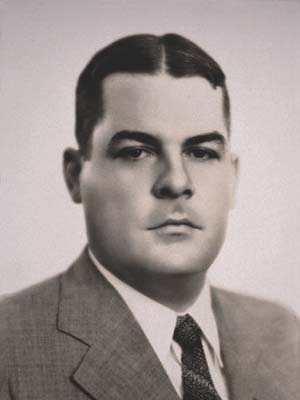
Gov. Leche

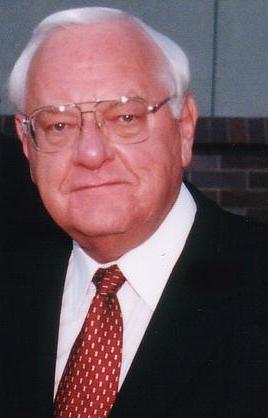
Gov. Ryan

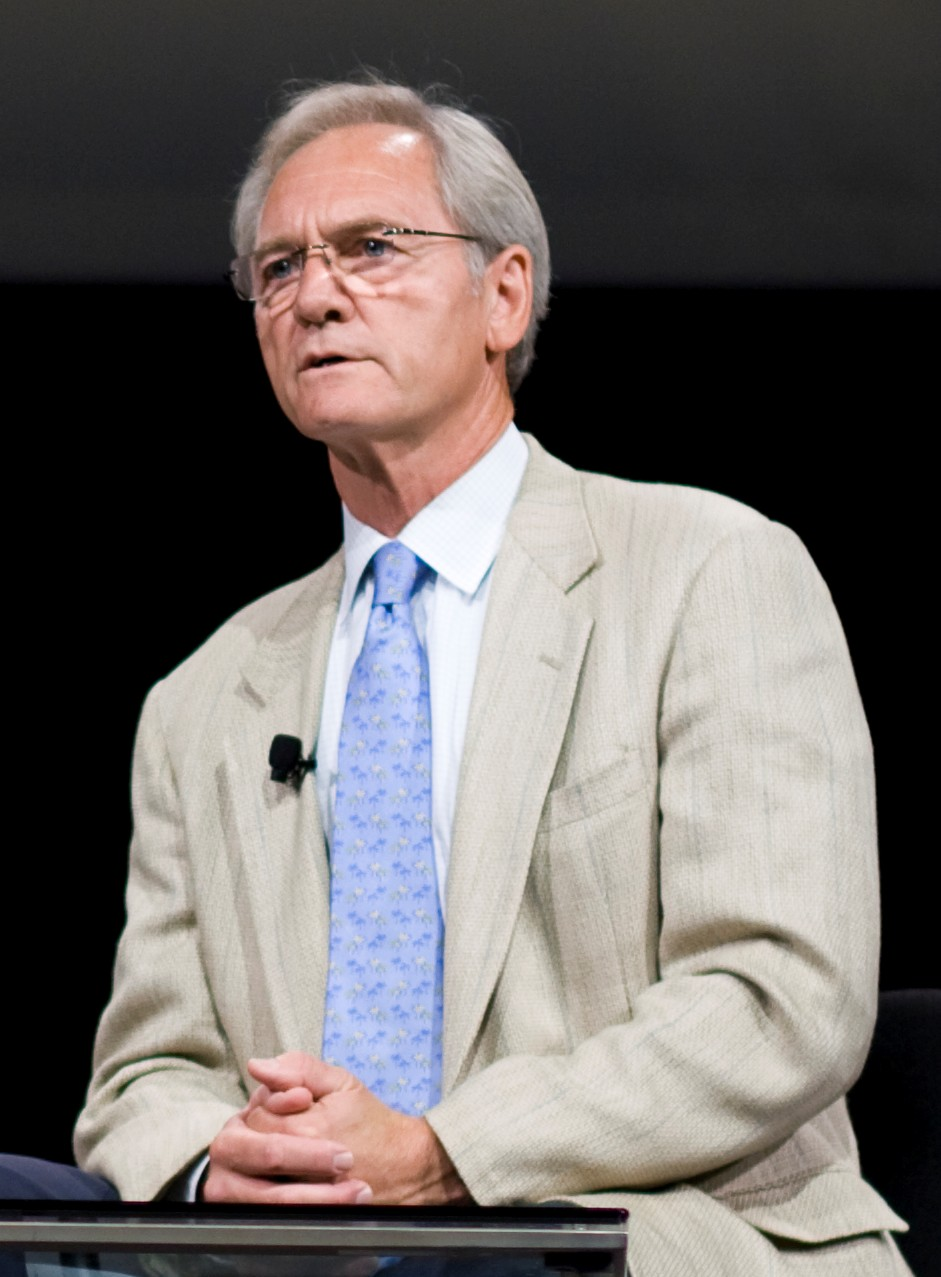
Gov. Siegelman

| Governor | Office | Crime(s) | Investigation | Notes |
|---|---|---|---|---|
| Rod Blagojevich | Governor of Illinois | Hobbs Act and mail fraud | Operation Board Games | |
| Ray Blanton | Governor of Tennessee | Hobbs Act and mail fraud | | |
| Edwin Edwards | Governor of Louisiana | Hobbs Act, mail fraud, and RICO | | |
| David Hall | Governor of Oklahoma | Hobbs Act and Travel Act | | |
| Otto Kerner, Jr. | Governor of Illinois | Mail fraud and Travel Act | | |
| William Langer | Governor of North Dakota | Conspiracy to defraud the United States | | |
| Richard W. Leche | Governor of Louisiana | Mail fraud | | |
| Arch A. Moore, Jr. | Governor of West Virginia | Hobbs Act and mail fraud | | |
| John G. Rowland | Governor of Connecticut | Mail fraud | | |
| George Ryan | Governor of Illinois | Mail fraud and RICO | Operation Safe Roads | |
| Don Siegelman | Governor of Alabama | Mail fraud and program bribery | | |

== Cabinet members ==
| Cabinet member | Office | Crime(s) | Investigation | Notes |
|---|---|---|---|---|
| Robert J. Burkhardt | Secretary of State of New Jersey | | | |
| R. Budd Dwyer | Treasurer of Pennsylvania | Mail fraud and RICO | | |
| Gilbert L. Dozier | Commissioner of Agriculture of the State of Louisiana | Hobbs Act and RICO | | |
| Richmond Flowers, Sr. | Attorney General of Alabama | Hobbs Act | | |
| Barney Grabiec | Director of the Illinois Department of Labor | Hobbs Act | | |
| John A. Kervick | New Jersey State Treasurer | Hobbs Act | | |
| Dan Morales | Attorney General of Texas | Mail fraud | | |
| Meg Scott Phipps | North Carolina Commissioner of Agriculture | Hobbs Act | | |
| Ernie Preate | Attorney General of Pennsylvania | Mail fraud | | |
| Paul J. Sherwin | Secretary of State of New Jersey | Hobbs Act | | |
| Paul Silvester | Connecticut State Treasurer | RICO | | |
| Robert Vigil | New Mexico State Treasurer | Hobbs Act | | |

== Legislators ==
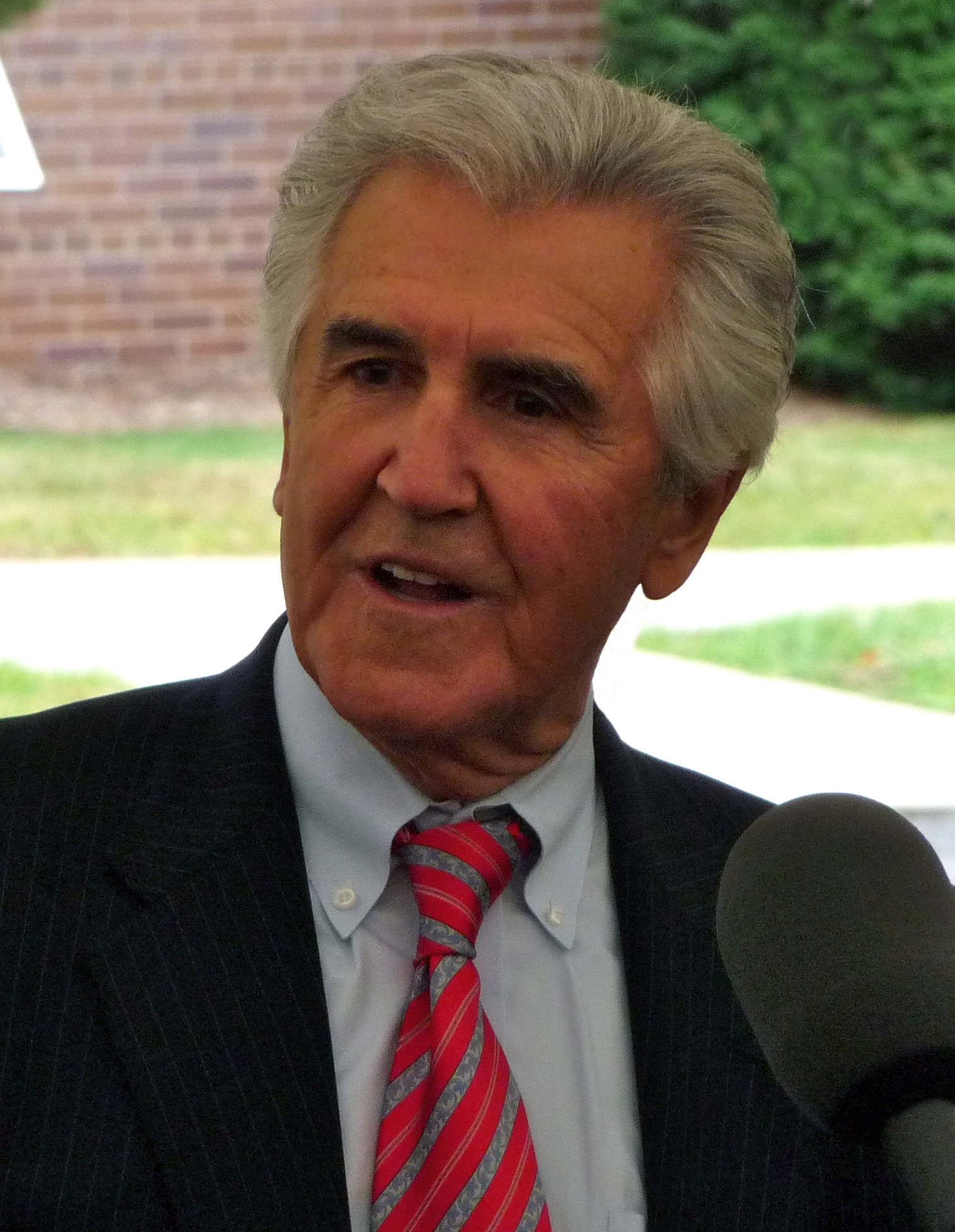
New York Senate majority leader Bruno

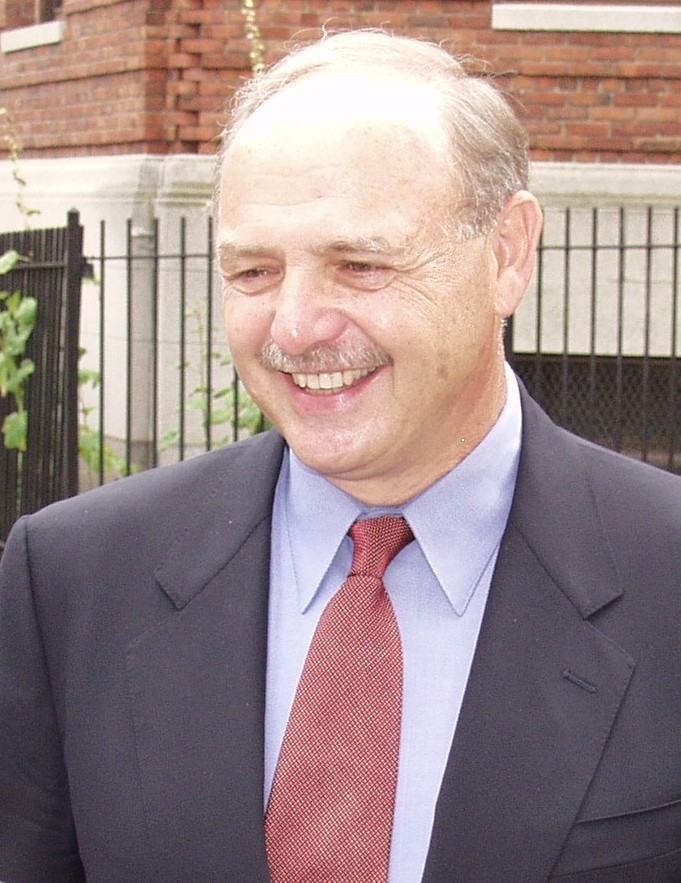
Massachusetts House speaker DiMasi

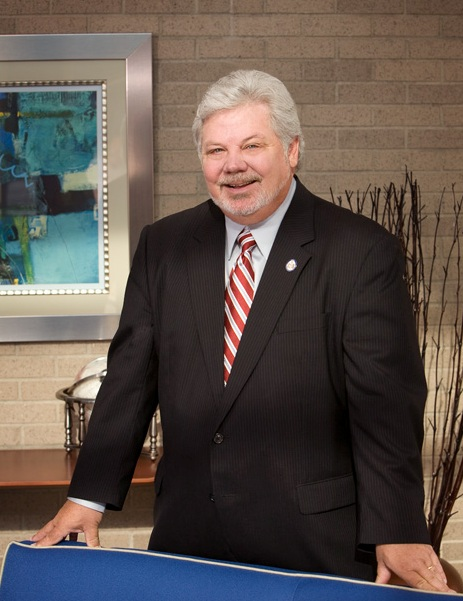
Virginia state representative Hamilton

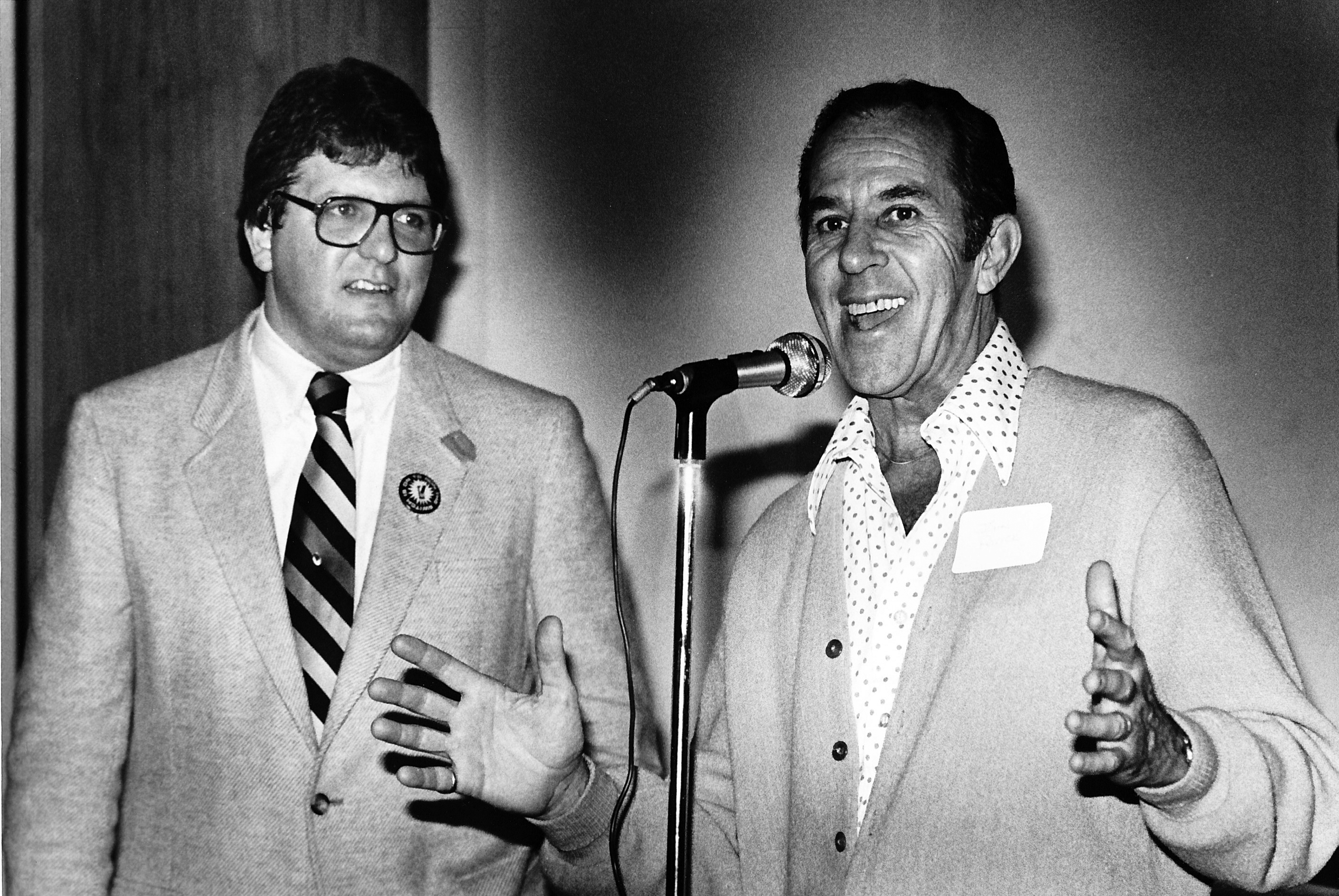
California state representative Nolan (left)

| State legislator | Office | Crime(s) | Investigation | Notes |
|---|---|---|---|---|
| Tom Anderson | Alaska state representative | Hobbs Act | Alaska political corruption probe | |
| John Bagnariol | Speaker of the Washington House of Representatives | RICO | | |
| Kenneth E. Bailey Sr. | South Carolina state representative | Hobbs Act | Operation Lost Trust | |
| Larry Bankston | Louisiana state senator | Travel Act | | |
| James B. Black | Speaker of the North Carolina House of Representatives | Program bribery | | |
| Don Blandford | Speaker of the Kentucky House of Representatives | Hobbs Act and RICO | Operation Boptrot | |
| Kathryn I. Bowers | Tennessee state senator | Program bribery | Operation Tennessee Waltz | |
| Thomas L. Bromwell | Maryland state senator | RICO | | |
| Jerry Bronger | Kentucky state representative | Hobbs Act | Operation Boptrot | |
| Wayne R. Bryant | New Jersey state senator | Mail fraud and program bribery | | |
| William G. Burgin | Mississippi state senator | Conspiracy to defraud the United States | | |
| Tommy Burnett | Tennessee House majority leader | Mail fraud | Operation Rocky Top | |
| Louis F. Capuzi | Illinois state representative | Mail fraud | | |
| Paul B. Carpenter | California state senator | Hobbs Act and RICO | BRISPEC sting operation | |
| Donald D. Carpentier | Illinois state senator | Mail fraud | | |
| John A. Celona | Rhode Island state senator | Mail fraud | | |
| Henry Cianfrani | Pennsylvania state senator | Mail fraud and RICO | | |
| Joseph Coniglio | New Jersey state senator | Hobbs Act and mail fraud | | |
| Kenneth Course | Illinois state senator | Mail fraud | | |
| Robert Craig | Illinois state representative | Mail fraud and Travel Act | | |
| John Cowdery | Alaska state senator | Program bribery | Alaska political corruption probe | |
| Clay Crupper | Kentucky state representative | Travel Act | Operation Boptrot | |
| Ward Crutchfield | Tennessee state senator | Program bribery | Operation Tennessee Waltz | |
| John A. D'Arco, Jr. | Illinois state senator | Hobbs Act | Operation Gambat | |
| Patricia Davis | Alabama state representative | Hobbs Act | | |
| Michael P. Decker | North Carolina state representative | Hobbs Act and mail fraud | | |
| Paul Derrick | South Carolina state representative | Hobbs Act | Operation Lost Trust | |
| Joseph DiCarlo | Massachusetts state senator | Hobbs Act and Travel Act | MBM investigation | |
| Salvatore DiMasi | Speaker of the Massachusetts House of Representatives | Hobbs Act and mail fraud | | |
| Roscoe Dixon | Tennessee state senator | Hobbs Act and program bribery | Operation Tennessee Waltz | |
| Ennis Fant | South Carolina state representative | Hobbs Act | Operation Lost Trust | |
| James C. Ferguson | South Carolina state representative | Hobbs Act | Operation Lost Trust | |
| Richard Foley, Jr. | Connecticut state representative | Program bribery | | |
| John Ford | Tennessee state senator | Wire fraud and program bribery | Operation Tennessee Waltz | |
| Gordon Fox | Speaker of the Rhode Island House of Representatives | Wire fraud, bribery, and filing a false tax return | | |
| Vince Fumo | Pennsylvania state senator | Mail fraud | | |
| Helen Garrett | Kentucky state senator | Mail fraud | Operation Boptrot | |
| Frank Gigliotti | Pennsylvania state representative | Hobbs Act | | |
| Edgar Gillock | Tennessee state senator | Hobbs Act and mail and wire fraud | | |
| Efrain Gonzalez | New York state senator | Mail fraud | | |
| Benjamin J. Gordon | South Carolina state representative | Hobbs Act | Operation Lost Trust | |
| Bob F. Griffin | Speaker of the Missouri House of Representatives | Mail fraud and program bribery | | |
| Phil Hamilton | Virginia state representative | Hobbs Act and program bribery | | |
| Frank Hill | California state representative | Hobbs Act | BRISPEC sting operation | |
| Max Homer | Pennsylvania state representative | Hobbs Act | | |
| Jeffrey D. Johnson | Ohio state senator | Hobbs Act | | |
| James A. Kelly, Jr. | Massachusetts state senator | Hobbs Act | | |
| Robert A. Kohn | South Carolina state representative | Hobbs Act | Operation Lost Trust | |
| Vic Kohring | Alaska state representative | Hobbs Act and program bribery | Alaska political corruption probe | |
| Pete Kott | Speaker of the Alaska House of Representatives | Hobbs Act, mail fraud, and program bribery | Alaska political corruption probe | |
| Carl Kruger | New York state senator | Mail fraud and Travel Act | | |
| David Flavous Lambert, Jr. | Mississippi state senator | Conspiracy to defraud the United States | | |
| Ronnie Layman | Kentucky state representative | Hobbs Act | Operation Boptrot | |
| Jefferson Marion Long, Jr. | South Carolina state representative | Hobbs Act | Operation Lost Trust | |
| John A. Lynch, Jr. | New Jersey state representative | Mail fraud | | |
| Ronald MacKenzie | Massachusetts state senator | Hobbs Act and Travel Act | MBM investigation | |
| Gerard M. Martineau | Rhode Island House majority leader | Mail fraud | | |
| Beverly Masek | Alaska state representative | Travel Act | Alaska political corruption probe | |
| Frank Mazzei | Pennsylvania state senator | Hobbs Act | | |
| William K. McBee | Kentucky state representative | Hobbs Act and Travel Act | Operation Boptrot | |
| Edward McClain | Alabama state senator | Mail fraud | | |
| Joseph B. Montoya | California state senator | Hobbs Act and RICO | BRISPEC sting operation | |
| Mike Morgan | Oklahoma state senator | Program bribery | | |
| J. Chris Newton | Tennessee state representative | Hobbs Act and program bribery | Operation Tennessee Waltz | |
| Ernie Newton | Connecticut state senator | Mail fraud | | |
| Pat Nolan | California state representative | RICO | BRISPEC sting operation | |
| Frank P. North, Jr. | Illinois state representative | Mail fraud | | |
| Virgil Pearman | Kentucky state senator | Mail fraud | Operation Boptrot | |
| Joseph R. Pisani | New York state senator | Mail fraud | | |
| Richard J. Rabbitt | Speaker of the Missouri House of Representatives | Hobbs Act and mail fraud | | |
| Alan Robbins | California state senator | Hobbs Act and RICO | | |
| John Rogers | Kentucky Senate minority leader | Hobbs Act and mail fraud | Operation Boptrot | |
| John I. Rogers, III | South Carolina state representative | RICO | Operation Lost Trust | |
| Michael Russo | Louisiana state representative | Hobbs Act | | |
| George Santoni | Maryland state representative | Hobbs Act | | |
| Anthony Seminerio | New York state representative | Mail fraud | | |
| Landon Sexton | Kentucky state senator | Mail fraud | Operation Boptrot | |
| Suzanne L. Schmitz | Alabama state representative | Mail fraud and program bribery | | |
| Terry Spicer | Alabama state representative | Program bribery | | |
| Bill Strong | Kentucky state representative | Mail fraud | Operation Boptrot | |
| Luther Langford Taylor, Jr. | South Carolina state representative | Hobbs Act | Operation Lost Trust | |
| Dan R. Tonkovich | West Virginia Senate President | Hobbs Act | | |
| Daniel Van Pelt | New Jersey state representative | Hobbs Act and program bribery | Operation Bid Rig | |
| Gordon Walgren | Washington Senate Majority Leader | Mail fraud, RICO, and Travel Act | | |
| Charles W. Walker, Sr. | Georgia Senate majority leader | Mail fraud | | |
| Jack E. Walker | Illinois state senator | Mail fraud | | |
| Dianne Wilkerson | Massachusetts state senator | Hobbs Act | | |
| Francis H. Woodward | Massachusetts state representative | Mail and wire fraud and Travel Act | | |

== See also ==
- List of federal political scandals in the United States
