= List of United States federal officials convicted of corruption offenses =

This list only includes federal officials convicted of certain select corruption crimes. For a more complete list see: List of American federal politicians convicted of crimes and List of federal political scandals in the United States.

Dozens of high-level United States federal officials have been convicted of public corruption offenses for conduct while in office. These officials have been convicted under two types of statutes. The first type are also applicable to corrupt state and local officials: the mail and wire fraud statutes (enacted 1872), including the honest services fraud provision, the Hobbs Act (enacted 1934), the Travel Act (enacted 1961), and the Racketeer Influenced and Corrupt Organizations Act (RICO) (enacted 1970). In addition, federal officials are subject to the federal bribery, graft, and conflict-of-interest crimes contained in Title 18, Chapter 11 of the United States Code, 18 U.S.C. §§ 201–227, which do not apply to state and local officials. Most notably, § 201(b) prohibits the receipt of bribes, and § 201(c) prohibits the receipt of unlawful gratuities, by federal public officials. Lesser used statutes include conspiracy to defraud the United States (enacted 1867) and the Foreign Corrupt Practices Act (FCPA) (enacted 1977).

Where the defendant is a member of the United States Congress, the Speech or Debate Clause of Article One of the United States Constitution—providing that: "[F]or any Speech or Debate in either House, [Senators or Representatives] shall not be questioned in any other Place"—limits the acts which may be charged and the evidence that may be introduced.

== Inclusion criteria and organization ==
Only high-level federal officials are included in this list. For the executive branch, this means the President, Vice President, and Cabinet members (i.e. officials compensated at Level I of the Executive Schedule). For the legislative branch, this means members of the Congress, whether the Senate or House of Representatives. For the judicial branch, this means Article Three judges. Lower-level officials are not included on this list, although they may be prosecuted for the same offenses.

Acquitted officials are not listed (if an official was acquitted on some counts, and convicted on others, the counts of conviction are listed). If a defendant is convicted of a conspiracy to commit a corruption offense, the substantive offense is listed. Convictions such as making false statements, perjury, obstruction of justice, electoral fraud, violations of campaign finance regulations, tax evasion and money laundering are not included in this list. Censure, impeachment, and removal from office are also not included in this list.

The list is organized by office. The criminal statute(s) under which the conviction(s) were obtained are noted, as are the names of notable investigations, scandals, or litigation, if applicable. The year of conviction is included (if the official was convicted multiple times due to retrials, only the year of the first conviction is included). Certain details, including post-conviction relief, if applicable, are included in footnotes. Political affiliation is also included.

== List ==
Official	Image	Office	State	Year	Crime(s)	Scandal/investigation/case	Notes	Party
Robert W. Archbald		Judge	United States	1913	Bribery			Republican
Daniel Brewster		Senate	Maryland	1972	Federal official gratuity	United States v. Brewster (1972)		Democrat
Joseph R. Burton		Senate	Kansas	1904	Compensated representation in a proceeding in which the United States is interested (Rev. Stat. § 1782) (codified as amended at 18 U.S.C. § 203)	Burton v. United States (1905, 1906)		Republican
Frank Ballance		House of Representatives	North Carolina	2004	Mail fraud			Democrat
Mario Biaggi		House of Representatives	New York	1987	Federal official gratuity and Travel Act			Democrat
Mario Biaggi		House of Representatives	New York	1988	Federal official gratuity, mail fraud, Hobbs Act, and RICO	Wedtech scandal		Democrat
Frank W. Boykin		House of Representatives	Alabama	1963	Federal official conflict-of-interest and conspiracy to defraud the United States			Democrat
Ernest K. Bramblett		House of Representatives	California	1954	Payroll fraud to cover kickbacks			Republican
Frank J. Brasco		House of Representatives	New York	1974	Conspiracy to defraud the United States			Democrat
Albert Bustamante		House of Representatives	Texas	1993	Federal official gratuity and RICO			Democrat
Alexander Caldwell		Senator	Kansas	1873	Bribery			Republican
Thomas Carney		Senator	Kansas	1873	Bribery			Republican
Frank M. Clark		House of Representatives	Pennsylvania	1979	Mail fraud			Democrat
Robert Frederick Collins		United States District Court for the Eastern District of Louisiana	Louisiana	1991	Federal official bribery and conspiracy to defraud the United States			N/A
Duke Cunningham		House of Representatives	California	2006	Mail fraud and federal official bribery	Cunningham scandal		Republican
Charles Diggs		House of Representatives	Michigan	1980	Mail fraud			Democrat
David Durenberger		Senator	Minnesota	1995	Misuse of Public Funds			Republican
John Dowdy		House of Representatives	Texas	1971	Federal official conflict-of-interest and Travel Act			Democrat
Joshua Eilberg		House of Representatives	Pennsylvania	1979	Federal official conflict-of-interest			Democrat
Albert B. Fall		Secretary of the Interior	New Mexico	1929	Revolving door (18 U.S.C. § 207)	Teapot Dome scandal		Republican
Robert García	Rep. García	House of Representatives	New York	1989	Hobbs Act	Wedtech scandal		Democrat
Richard T. Hanna		House of Representatives	California	1978	Conspiracy to defraud the United States	Koreagate		Democrat
James F. Hastings		House of Representatives	New York	1976	Mail fraud			Republican
Andrew J. Hinshaw		House of Representatives	California	1976	Bribery			Republican
John H. Hoeppel		House of Representatives	California	1935	Sale of appointive office (18 U.S.C. § 150) (currently codified at 18 U.S.C. § 211)			Democrat
Jesse Jackson Jr.		House of Representatives	Illinois	2013	Mail and Wire			Democrat
William J. Jefferson		House of Representatives	Louisiana	2009	Federal official bribery, wire fraud, Foreign Corrupt Practices Act, and RICO	William J. Jefferson corruption case		Democrat
John Jenrette		House of Representatives	South Carolina	1980	Federal official bribery	Abscam		Democrat
Thomas Francis Johnson		House of Representatives	Maryland	1963	Federal official conflict-of-interest and conspiracy to defraud the United States	United States v. Johnson (1966)		Democrat
Richard Kelly		House of Representatives	Florida	1981	Federal official bribery, conspiracy to defraud the United States, and Travel Act	Abscam		Republican
Joseph P. Kolter		House of Representatives	Pennsylvania	1996	Conspiracy to defraud the United States	Congressional Post Office scandal		Democrat
Raymond F. Lederer		House of Representatives	Pennsylvania	1981	Federal official bribery and gratuity, conspiracy to defraud the United States, and Travel Act	Abscam		Democrat
William Lorimer		Senator	Illinois	1912	Bribery			Republican
Buz Lukens		House of Representatives	Ohio	1996	Federal official bribery	House banking scandal		Republican
Martin Thomas Manton		United States Court of Appeals for the Second Circuit	N/A	1939	Conspiracy to defraud the United States			N/A
Nicholas Mavroules		House of Representatives	Massachusetts	1993	Hobbs Act and RICO			Democrat
Andrew J. May		House of Representatives	Kentucky	1947	Conspiracy to defraud the United States and compensated representation in a proceeding in which the United States is interested (18 U.S.C. § 203)			Democrat
John H. Mitchell		Senate	Oregon	1905	Compensated representation in a proceeding in which the United States is interested (Rev. Stat. § 1782) (codified as amended at 18 U.S.C. § 203)	Oregon land fraud scandal		Republican
John M. Murphy		House of Representatives	New York	1980	Federal official gratuity, federal official conflict-of interest, and conspiracy to defraud the United States	Abscam		Democrat
Michael Myers		House of Representatives	Pennsylvania	1980	Federal official bribery, conspiracy to defraud the United States, and Travel Act	Abscam		Democrat
Bob Ney		House of Representatives	Ohio	2006	Mail fraud	Jack Abramoff CNMI scandal		Republican
Nehemiah G. Ordway		US Governor of Dakota Territory	Dakota Territory	1884	Bribery			Republican
Bertram L. Podell		House of Representatives	New York	1974	Federal official conflict-of-interest and conspiracy to defraud the United States			Democrat
Halsted Ritter		District Judge	Florida	1936	Bribery			Republican
Dan Rostenkowski		House of Representatives	Illinois	1998	Mail fraud	Congressional Post Office scandal		Democrat
George Santos		House of Representatives	New York	2024	Wire fraud and identity theft			Republican
Frank Thompson		House of Representatives	New Jersey	1980	Federal official bribery and gratuity and conspiracy to defraud the United States	Abscam		Democrat
James Traficant		House of Representatives	Ohio	2002	Federal official bribery and gratuity, conspiracy to defraud the United States, and RICO			Democrat
J. Irving Whalley		House of Representatives	Pennsylvania	1973	Mail fraud			Republican
Harrison A. Williams		Senate	New Jersey	1981	Federal official bribery and gratuity, federal official conflict-of-interest, Travel Act, and conspiracy to defraud the United States	Abscam		Democrat
Bob Menendez		Senate	New Jersey	2024	Bribery, extortion, acting as a foreign agent, obstruction of justice and several counts of conspiracy.			Democrat

== See also ==
- Ulysses S. Grant presidential administration scandals
- List of federal political scandals in the United States
