= Commercial bribery =

Corrupt deals in the private sector

Commercial bribery is a form of bribery which involves corrupt dealing with the agents or employees of potential buyers to secure an advantage over business competitors. It is a form of corruption which does not necessarily involve government personnel or facilities.

One common type of commercial bribery is the kickback. For example, a seller of goods or services from "Company A" who offers the purchasing manager of "Company B" a payment to his own account to help him secure a contract for Company B's continued business is engaging in a form of commercial bribery.

Other related offenses are payola in the entertainment industry, match fixing in sports, corruption of labor union officials, and bid rigging in non-governmental contracts.

== United States law ==
There is no federal statute that by its terms expressly prohibits commercial bribery generally though it is mentioned as part of the definition of aggravated felony for the purposes of US immigration law and is prohibited to induce sales of alcoholic beverages through commercial bribery. It is usually punishable as a felony under state law, depending on circumstances, but only 36 states have laws specifically prohibiting commercial bribery. Among them are California, Delaware, Massachusetts, New Jersey, New York, Texas, and Washington. However, the federal mail and wire fraud statutes can be used to prosecute commercial bribery as a "scheme or artifice to defraud" if the mail or interstate wire facilities are used. In addition, use of the mails or interstate travel or communication in furtherance of a violation of state commercial bribery laws may be prosecutable in Federal court under the Travel Act. As the penalties under the federal statutes may exceed the state penalties, and the federal investigative and enforcement agencies may have superior resources, often federal prosecution is favored.

New York's law against commercial bribery is contained in Article 180 of the state's penal code. It is one of the most extensive state laws against commercial bribery in the United States, and includes prohibitions against bribing labor officials, fixing sports contests, and rent gouging.

== See also ==
- Secret profit
