= Lorraine Hunt =

American politician

32nd Lieutenant Governor of Nevada
- In office January 4, 1999 – January 1, 2007
- Governor: Kenny Guinn
- Preceded by: Lonnie Hammargren
- Succeeded by: Brian Krolicki

Member of the Clark County Commission from district G
- In office 1995–1999
- Preceded by: Karen Hayes
- Succeeded by: Dario Herrera

Personal details
- Born: Lorraine Theresa Perry; March 11, 1939 (age 87) Niagara Falls, New York, U.S.
- Party: Republican
- Occupation: Entertainer and Restaurant owner

Lorraine T. Hunt (born March 11, 1939) is an American businesswoman, former politician and entertainer who served as the 32nd lieutenant governor of Nevada from 1999 to 2007.

Hunt was elected to the Clark County Commission in 1994, defeating Democratic incumbent Karen Hayes.

In 1998 Hunt was elected Lieutenant Governor of Nevada, defeating Democrat Rose McKinney-James. She was re-elected in 2002 by defeating Democratic Clark County commissioner Erin Kenny. She served as President of the Nevada State Senate, a member of Governor Kenny Guinn's cabinet, Chairwoman of the State Tourism Commission, Chairwoman of the State Economic Development Commission, and Vice Chairwoman of the Department of Transportation Board of Directors.

Hunt was a candidate for the Republican nomination for the 2006 Nevada gubernatorial election. She lost the Republican primary against Congressman Jim Gibbons. Hunt is the owner of The Bootlegger Bistro, a restaurant and special events center, long popular with Las Vegas locals and showroom performers.

== See also ==
- List of female lieutenant governors in the United States

Political offices
Preceded by Lonnie Hammargren	Lieutenant Governor of Nevada; January 4, 1999 – January 20, 2007	Succeeded by Brian Krolicki
