= Taylor v. United States (2016) =

- Supreme Court of the United States

Argued February 23, 2016 Decided June 20, 2016
- Full case name: David Anthony Taylor, Petitioner v. United States
- Docket no.: 14-6166
- Citations: 579 U.S. 301 (more) 136 S. Ct. 2074; 195 L. Ed. 2d 456
- Decision: Opinion

Case history
- Prior: United States v. Taylor, 754 F.3d 217 (4th Cir. 2014)

Holding
- In a federal criminal prosecution under the Hobbs Act, the government is not required to prove an interstate commerce element beyond a reasonable doubt.

Court membership
- Chief Justice John Roberts Associate Justices Anthony Kennedy · Clarence Thomas; Ruth Bader Ginsburg · Stephen Breyer; Samuel Alito · Sonia Sotomayor; Elena Kagan

Case opinions
- Majority: Alito, joined by Roberts, Kennedy, Ginsburg, Breyer, Sotomayor, Kagan
- Dissent: Thomas

Laws applied
- Hobbs Act

Taylor v. United States, 579 U.S. 301 (2016), was a United States Supreme Court case in which the Court held that in a federal criminal prosecution under the Hobbs Act, the government is not required to prove an interstate commerce element beyond a reasonable doubt. The Court relied on its decision in Gonzales v. Raich, 545 U.S. 1 (2005), which held that Congress has the authority to regulate the marijuana market given that even local activities can have a "substantial effect" on interstate commerce.

== Background ==
David Anthony Taylor performed two home-invasion robberies with the intent of stealing from two perceived marijuana dealers in Roanoke, Virginia. When initially tried in federal court, the jury deadlocked because of arguments that the marijuana in question was grown and intended for use within Virginia. Taylor was then retried where the judge precluded that line of argument and convicted. The high court upheld that conviction.

== Opinion of the Court ==
Associate Justice Samuel Alito authored the majority opinion.

== See also ==
- Cannabis in Virginia
- Gonzales v. Raich
