= List of train robberies in the United States =

This is a chronological list of train robberies that occurred in the United States from the 1860s to 2025.

== 1800s ==
Location	Date	Culprits	Description
Western and Atlantic Railroad, Georgia	April 12, 1862	2nd, 21st, and 33rd Ohio Volunteer Infantry Regiment led by James J. Andrews	During the American Civil War, James J. Andrews and his men commandeered a Confederate train called The General.
Baltimore and Ohio Railroad	October 14, 1864	Confederate Guerrillas	A party of Confederate guerrillas robbed a train and burned the cars. Also known as "Moseby's "Greenback Raid", occurred October 16, 1864, just east of Duffield's Station (W.Va) on the Baltimore and Ohio Railroad. Moseby and his Raiders stopped a westbound B&O Passenger train hauling a Union Army payroll, and they also held up the passengers. The locomotive was derailed and damaged. later salvaged by the B&O, headlight and cow catcher remnants were found by CSX Railroad crews in the 1990s when ditching the track at the site of the Raid. See:https://www.hmdb.org/m.asp?m=238787 See also: Duffield's Station: Duffields station See: Photo: Old Duffield's Station. See also: https://gallivantingthroughvirginia.com/2023/03/26/mosbys-greenback-raid-duffields-bo-railroad-depot/
West of Cincinnati, Ohio	May 5, 1865	possibly Confederate Guerrillas	A group of armed men boarded a train and robbed it of all its valuables, it is suspected the men were Confederates angered by the south's surrender.
Seymour, Indiana	October 6, 1866	John and Simeon Reno	John and Simeon Reno of the Reno gang robbed an Ohio and Mississippi Railway passenger train. The men boarded the train, entered the Adam Express Co. car, and intimidated employee Elem Miller into giving them the keys, the men then emptied the safe and left the train once it stopped.
Marshfield, Scott County, Indiana	May 22, 1868	Reno Gang	The Reno gang held up a Jeffersonville, Madison and Indianapolis Railroad and stole $90,000 ($2 million in 2024).
Verdi, Nevada	November 4, 1870	a gang of five men	A gang of five men stopped a Central Pacific Railroad train in Verdi and forced the train engineer, Henry Smalls, to stop the train and stole $41,600 [equivalent to $1,001,261 in 2024] only $3,000 was returned.
Moscow, Kentucky	July 1871	Farrington Brothers	Levi and Hillary Farrington, William Taylor, George Bertine, and William Barton, a former railroad brakeman, robbed a Southern Express car on the Mobile and Ohio Railroad at Moscow, Kentucky. They successfully made off with $1600.
Union City, Tennessee	October 21, 1871	Farrington Brothers	The group robbed another Mobile & Ohio Railroad and made off with about $6000.
Adir, Iowa	July 21, 1873	James–Younger Gang	Jesse James and the gang robbed a derailed Rock Island Line train and stole $3,000 (equivalent to $76,000 in 2023), the gang wore Ku Klux Klan mask in protest of President Grant's Enforcement Acts.
Gads Hill, Missouri	January 31, 1874	James–Younger Gang	The gang entered and robbed a small general store, they then stopped and boarded a train at 4:45 PM and stole $12,000 (equivalent to $290,000 in 2023) from rich men (they avoided robbing working-class men and women.)
Big Springs, Nebraska	September 18, 1877	Sam Bass, Joel Collins, Jack Davis, Tom Nixon, Bill Heffridge, and Jim Berry	The Black Hills gang led by Sam Bass boarded Union Pacific express train No. 4 at 10:48 PM and proceeded to rob the passengers and pistol-whip an employee, the men stole $60,000 [equivalent to $1,716,750 in 2023] worth of gold.
Medicine Bow, Wyoming	August 16, 1878	Big Nose George, Frank McKinney, Joe Manuse, Jack Campbell, John Wells, Tom Reed, Frank Tole, and Dutch “Charley” Burress.	The group of 7 men planned to rob a Union Pacific train by derailing the train but were stopped by the trains crew and gang received a $10,000 bounty.
Winston, Montana	July 21, 1881	James-Younger Gang	Jesse James and his gang boarded a train leaving the town of Winston, Montana and proceeded to rob the express car and kill two men and the conductor.
Glendale, Missouri	September 7, 1881	Jesse and Frank James	The brothers committed their last robbery and stole $1,000 - $3,000 from the train.
Bellevue, Texas	December 11, 1886	Rube Burrow, Jim Burrow, W.L. Brock, Leonard Brock, Henderson Brumley, and Nep Thornton	Rube and the men robbed a Denver & Fort Worth Express train in Bellevue, Texas. The gang boarded the train and held everyone at gun point, the men got about $300 from the passengers and Sgt. Chase Conner of the 24th Infantry Regiment, nearly shot the men but was persuaded not to.
Unknown	May 1887	Bill Whitley Gang and Brack Cornett	Brack Cornett with the newly formed Bill Whitely Gang attempted to rob a train but it was unsuccessful.
San Antonio, Texas	May 18, 1887	Bill Whitley Gang	The gang robbed a Missouri-Pacific train and stole $4,000.
Benbrook, Texas	June 9, 1887	Rube Burrow and his gang	Rube Burrow and his gang boarded a Texas & Pacific Express and held the train engineer at gunpoint and stole $1,350.00 from the mail car.
Near Fort Worth, Texas	September 20, 1887	Rube Burrow and his gang	Rube Burrow robbed another Texas & Pacific Express in a manner very similar to the robbery in Benbrook.
Genoa, Arkansas	December 9, 1887	Rube Burrow and Jim Brock	The men stopped a St. Louis, Arkansas & Texas Railroad express train in Genoa, Arkansas. The train was protected by Pinkerton agents from the Southern Express Company and stole money from a Louisiana lottery payoff estimated to be between $10,000 and $40,000.
Canyon Diablo, Arizona	March 20, 1889	Dan Harvick, John Halford, William Stiren, and J. J. Smith	A group of four cowboys and drifters robbed an Atlantic and Pacific train and stole $1,300.
Canyon Diablo, Arizona	April 1889	James Lee	James Lee robbed a train in Canyon Diablo and went on the run until his capture in January 1890.
Arkansas River's Royal Gorge	August 31, 1891	Peg Leg Watson and Bert Curtis	The men halted a Denver & Rio Grande train and stole thousands of dollars and gold.
Monroe Junction, Florida	May 11, 1892	4 unknown men	A train belonging to The West Indian Fast Mail was stopped north of Monroe Junction, two of the men forced the fireman and train engineer, a man known only as Dumas, to stop the train. The other men attempted to enter the express car but were stopped by two men W. N. Saunders and I. M. Cox, Saunders was shot in the breast and later died. The men fled into the woods fearing the possibility of being lynched by a mob.
Minnesota River, Minnesota	July 1, 1892	George, John Sontag, and Chris Evans	The trio attempted to rob a train traveling between St. Peter and Kasota but where stopped by the arrival of Pinkerton agents.
Frenso, California	August 1, 1892	George, John Sontag, and Chris Evans	The trio robbed a train leaving Frenso and got $500 worth of Mexican and Peruvian currency.
Huntington, West Virginia	before December 16, 1892	4 unknown men	Around 11 o'clock, a train on the Chesapeake and Ohio road was held up by four robbers, two of the passengers, an unknown German immigrants and Peter Drake of Cincinnati tackled the robbers and both men were shot but not killed, the robbers fled into the dark when the ticket collector named Zingley opened fire unto the men.
Between Houghton and Calumet, Michigan	September 15, 1893	The LaLiberty Gang	The gang stopped a Adams Express Company train and stole $65 but were stopped and arrested by the Pinkerton Agency.
Jackson County, Arkansas	November 7, 1893	The Oliphant Train Robbers (presumed to be Dalton Gang)	The gang robbed a St. Louis, Iron Mountain and Southern Railway, the men stole $6,000 and were briefly stopped by the Irish conductor William P. McNally who shot at them with a pistol he received from a passenger named Charles Lamb, they shot him and left the train.
Fort Gibson, Oklahoma	July 18, 1894	Crawford Goldsby and his gang	Goldsby and his gang held up a Frisco train Wells-Fargo Express Company and the St Louis and San Francisco railroad train at Red Fork.
Correatta, Oklahoma	October 20, 1894	Crawford Goldsby and his gang	Crawford Goldsby and his gang robbed a train.
San Antonio, Texas	May 14th, 1897		
Twin Mountain, Colorado	September 9, 1897	"Black Jack" Ketchum and his brother	Black Jack and his brother boarded a passenger train and stole $10,000.
Glyndon, Minnesota	September 26, 1897	2 men	Two men boarded the train and detached the Wells Fargo express car and ordered the conductor to continue driving, the men then looted it and planned to blow it up but were scared off by the law.
Wilcox, Wisconsin	June 2, 1899	Butch Cassidy's Wild Bunch.	A Union Pacific train was flagged down over a wooden bridge and the Wild Bunch boarded it and blew up the safe with dynamite and stole $36,000.
Cochise, Arizona	September 9, 1899	Alvord-Stiles Gang	The gang led by Bill Downing held up the train crew and detached the Wells Fargo express car from the train and stole $10,000.

== 1900s ==
Location	Date	Culprits	Description
Fairbank, Arizona	February 15, 1900	Bob Brown, "Bravo Juan" Tom Yoas, the brothers George and Louis Owens, and "Three Fingered Jack" Dunlop.	The gang held up the train and attempted to access the Wells Fargo express car, Jeff Milton was shot in the shoulder, and in response, he shot Dunlop with a sawed-off shotgun, and died, the gang couldn't find a key or dynamite, and they only stole 17 Pesos.
Tipton, Wyoming	August 29, 1900	Butch Cassidy, the Sundance Kid, Kid Curry, and possibly Will Carver	Butch Cassidy, the Sundance Kid, Kid Curry, and another unknown gang member (possibly Will Carver) robbed a Union Pacific train.
St. Louis, Missouri	1901	Laura Bullion	Laura Bullion robbed a train and was convicted in early November.
Oregon	September 1903	Bill Miner's gang	Bill Miner's gang made an unsuccessful holdup of an Oregon Railroad and Navigation Company train.
Omaha, Nebraska	May 22, 1909	Donald Woods, Fred Torgensen and Frank Grigward along with two others	At 11pm the five men held up a Union Pacific mail train and stole $500–$700, the Post Office Department placed a bounty of $20,000 on the robbers and by November 11 all five men were arrested and sent to Leavenworth Prison.
Lenapah, Oklahoma	March 25, 1911	Elmer McCurdy, 3 other men	Elmer and his men robbed a Missouri Pacific Railroad train and found a safe filled with $4,000, Elmer used his military experience to put nitroglycerin on the safe and blew it open. However it was too much and most of the money was destroyed and they only made out with $100–500 worth of melted sliver coins.
Okesa, Oklahoma	October 4, 1911	Elmer McCurdy, and two others	The three men intended to steal $400,000 in cash being sent as royalty payment to the Osage Nation. However they accidentally robbed a regular passenger train and made away with only $46. This robbery would lead to McCurdy being killed by the police in a barn shootout.
Sanderson, Texas	March 13, 1912	Ben Kilpatrick and Ole Hobek	At 12:05 am, Ben Kilpatrick, a former member of the Wild Bunch and his associate Ole Hobek boarded Southern Pacific's Train #9 In Dryden, Texas and rode on it until it was out of the town. Upon leaving the town, Kilpatrick and Hobek made the train engineer, D. E. Grosh, stop at a bridge near Baxter's Curve. Whilst Kilpatrick watched over the engineer, Hobek went to the express car with the express messenger David A. Trousdale along with two other crewmen, Trousdale managed to grab an ice mallet and when they made it to the car, Trousdale beat Hobek over the head killing him instantly. The men then grabbed his rifle and two pistols and shot Kilpatrick.
Poteau, Oklahoma	October 4, 1912	Four unknown robbers	The robbers silently boarded the train as it slowed down to stop at a railway crossing and swiftly entered the engine room, catching all the crew members by surprise. They then blew the safe open and emptied its content and escaped before even the passengers knew there was a robbery in progress. By daybreak, the lawmen and local vigilantes launched a massive manhunt for the robbers, but the robbers were long gone without a trace. In total, the gang made off with over $7,000 together with most of the registered mail that was on the train.
Tuscaloosa, Alabama	September 27, 1913	three unknown bandits	A New York-New Orleans train was robbed by "three youthful bandits" who successfully escaped sheriffs from both Birmingham and Montgomery.
Blue Mountains, Oregon	July 2, 1914	Clarence Stoner, Albert Meadors, Charles Manning	The men robbed a Oregon & Washington Railway Navigation Co. passenger train when it stopped in the Blue Mountains, the men robbed the wrong train and were shot at by a sheriff who was on the train, Manning was killed in the gunfire and the other two escaped.
Muskogee, Oklahoma	1915	Jack Davis	A notorious robber from Oklahoma robbed a Missouri, Kansas & Texas Railroad train which landing him a ten-year sentence.
Bliss, Oklahoma	Winter of 1916	Joe Davis and his gang	Joe and his gang robbed a train from Santa Fe, Texas and shot and killed the mail clerk.
Wyoming	February 9, 1916	William L. Carlisle	William stopped and held up a train while wearing a white bandana and was notably very kind to the passengers and guards.
Arizona	April 1917	Joe Davis	Son of Jack Davis and robber committed a robbery and was given a 21-year sentence.
Whiting, Indiana	September 18, 1919	Carl Stieler Jr., John S. Wejda, Leo Wejda and Walter Filipkowski	Carl Stieler a World War 1 veteran along with the other two robbed a payroll train and stole $234,000.
Kauai, Hawaii	February 11, 1920	Kaimiola Hali	A fisherman wearing a towel with eye holes, stopped a train near the Kekaha Sugar Co. held the conductor known only as Mr. Asser and stole a little more than $11,000. The majority of the money was recovered by the authorities several days later.
Roseville, California	May 19, 1921	Roy Gardner	Roy Gardner boarded a Southern Pacific train in Sacramento and stole $187,000 from the express car.
Roseville, California	May 20, 1921	Roy Gardner	Roy Gardner boarded a mail train and received a $5,000 bounty being placed on Roy's head.
Siskiyou Mountains, California	October 11, 1923	DeAutremont Brothers	The brothers, Roy, Ray and Hugh DeAutremont attempted to rob Southern Pacific Railroad Train No. 13, the brothers armed with sawed-off shotguns climbed onto the locomotive tender and forced the engineer Sideny Bates to stop the train while it was inside of a tunnel and attached all their dynamite to the mail baggage car but were forced to flee when they were shot at by police.
Rondout, Illinois	June 11, 1924	Newton Gang	In 1924, the gang would commit the biggest rail heist in American history by robbing a mail train near Rondout, Illinois. The gang netted $3 million in cash, jewelry and negotiable securities but one of the members, Doc Newton was wounded by one of the gang which prevented their successful escape.
West of El Paso, Texas	November 24, 1937	Henry Loftus and Harry Donaldson	The two men boarded a Southern Pacific Railroad leaving El Paso planning to rob it, Loftus left his seat and held the conductor W. H. Holloway at gunpoint, Donaldson then began to rob the passengers of their valuables, panicking Donaldson shot a random passenger and Loftus was tackled by a brakeman W. L. Smith who Loftus killed accidentally, this angered the passengers who beat both men to the point of near death and both men were arrested.

== 2000s ==
Location	Date	Culprits	Description
Los Angeles, California	August 2022	unknown	82 guns were stolen from a Union Pacific train heading to Tennessee and were resold.
Chicago, Illinois	October 12, 2024	30 armed thieves	A large group of armed people swarmed a Union Pacific freight train in Chicago and stole various objects like air fryers and televisions.
Northern Arizona	March 27, 2025	11 unknown thieves	A group of individuals stole Nike shoes from a train which led to an 80-mile police chase. All the thieves were arrested.
