= Edgar Gillock =

American politician (1928–2021)

Member of the Tennessee Senate from the 29th district
- In office 1969 – January 2, 1983

Personal details
- Born: July 30, 1928 Savannah, Tennessee
- Died: February 27, 2021 (aged 92) Bolivar, Tennessee
- Spouse(s): Jimmie Mae Smith; Joan Frederickson; Joyce Jeanette Finley; Harriett Thompson
- Children: 7
- Occupation: Attorney (former)

Edgar Hardin Gillock (July 30, 1928 – February 27, 2021) was an American politician in the state of Tennessee. A Democrat, he served in the Tennessee State Senate from 1969 until his resignation in 1983.

He served in World War II. The son of Edgar Cherry and Ruth Hardin Gillock, he was born in Savannah, Hardin County, Tennessee and attended Memphis State University, where he attained BS, MA, and LLB degrees. He later worked as an attorney and was a Baptist.

He resigned from his senate seat on January 2, 1983, after being convicted on influence peddling charges. He was disbarred in 1988.
