= Operation Silver Shovel =

1990s FBI probe

- Date: 1990s
- Location: Chicago, United States
- Type: Political corruption investigation
- Participants: John Christopher (FBI informant)
- Convicted: 18 individuals
- Charges: Political corruption, bribery, money laundering, illegal dumping, labor union corruption, drug trafficking, organized crime activity

Operation Silver Shovel was a major United States Federal Bureau of Investigation (FBI) probe into political corruption in Chicago during the 1990s. By the end of the probe illegal activities from labor union corruption to drug trafficking, organized crime activity and elected city officials on the take were unearthed, and corruption convictions were handed out to 18 individuals.

== Background ==
In the 1980s, the federal Operation Greylord investigation of the Cook County courts found almost 100 lawyers and judges who were eventually sent to jail, disbarred or suspended for illegal actions. However, when the individuals were heading off to jail, some lawyers and judges fixed cases. That produced Operation Gambat, which unearthed more corrupt officials and suspects.

== The operation ==
John Christopher was an FBI mole, an insider to the Chicago construction business and now a convicted felon and lifelong American Mafia associate. The FBI relied on Christopher to get audio or visual recordings of illegal transactions including bribes, money laundering and cocaine purchases. By 1995, Christopher had made over 1,100 recordings. The informant gave cash payments or other bribes to city officials in exchange for help in obtaining work. These officials include city aldermen, city inspectors, project leaders, and others. The bribes centered on city contracts for hauling construction debris; Christopher paid officials to allow him to dump debris in illegal areas. The bribes totaled $150,000 in the end, and the money laundering over $2.2 million.

== Indicted ==
1. Ambrosio Medrano, 25th Ward alderman
2. Allan Streeter, 17th Ward alderman
3. Jesse Evans, 21st Ward alderman
4. Lawrence Bloom, 5th Ward alderman
5. Virgil Jones, 15th Ward alderman
6. Percy Giles, 37th Ward alderman
