= Erin Kenny =

American politician (born 1960)

Clark County (Nevada) Commissioner from District F
- In office 1995–2003
- Preceded by: Don Schlesinger
- Succeeded by: Mark James

Member of the Nevada Assembly from the 4th district
- In office 1993–1995
- Preceded by: Brad Goetting
- Succeeded by: Deanna Braunlin

Personal details
- Born: December 21, 1960 (age 65) Pasadena, California
- Party: Democratic

Erin Leigh Callin Kenny (born December 21, 1960) is a former Democratic politician from Nevada.

Kenny earned her law degree on May 17, 2002, from William S. Boyd School of Law, University of Nevada, Las Vegas. She subsequently failed the Nevada bar exam.

== Political career ==
Kenny was elected to a single term in the Nevada Assembly in 1992, defeating Republican incumbent Brad Goetting.

Kenny was elected to the Clark County Commission in 1994. Running against Richard Moreno, she won with 50.26% of the vote. Kenny ran again in 1998 and won reelection with 52.56% of the vote against challenger Steve Harney.

On April 19, 2001, Kenny appeared before the Nevada Commission on Ethics, accused of pressuring county employees to break into the Clark County administration building to get payroll records. She was cleared of wrongdoing in a 3 to 1 decision.

Kenny was the Democratic nominee for Lieutenant Governor of Nevada in 2002, but was defeated by Republican incumbent Lorraine Hunt.

Early in 2003 Kenny was implicated in Operation G-Sting, a federal corruption investigation involving a Las Vegas strip club. She agreed to plead guilty and turn state's evidence in exchange for a lighter sentence. On July 24, 2003, Kenny pleaded guilty to a "three-count criminal indictment charging her with conspiracy to commit wire fraud and wire fraud for the purpose of depriving the citizens of Nevada of her honest services as a Clark County Commissioner." The investigation ultimately resulted in the convictions of several other former elected officials, including former county commissioners Lance Malone, Dario Herrera and Mary Kincaid-Chauncey. After her guilty plea, Kenny was hired by developer Jim Rhodes as a consultant. On July 18, 2007, she was sentenced to 30 months in federal prison and fined a total of $200,000 for her taking of bribe money.

On October 16, 2007, Kenny reported to the federal prison camp in Phoenix, Arizona, as inmate no. 36965-048 to start serving her 30-month sentence on political corruption and bribery charges. Since there is no parole in the federal prison system, she needed to serve 25.5 months (2 years, 1.5 months) before her sentence expired and she was released (approximately December 2009). Kenny was later transferred back to the Las Vegas Corrections Center on June 17, 2009, where she spent the rest of her sentence until her scheduled release on December 18. She was listed as living in Las Vegas as recently as 2017.

Preceded by Don Schlesinger	Clark County Commission; District F 1995 - 2003	Succeeded by Mark James
