= Betty Loren-Maltese =

American politician and criminal

Town President of Cicero, Illinois
- In office 1993 – 2002
- Preceded by: Henry Klosak
- Succeeded by: Ramiro Gonzalez

Personal details
- Born: Baton Rouge, Louisiana
- Party: Republican
- Spouse: Frank Maltese

Betty Loren-Maltese is the former town president of Cicero, Illinois. She is a member of the Republican Party and received national attention for her role in an insurance scam which robbed the town of $12 million.

== Biography ==
Loren-Maltese was born in Baton Rouge, Louisiana, but she was raised in the Chicago area. After working as a waitress, realtor, and newspaper publisher, she became active in the politics of Cicero, a suburb adjacent to the west side of Chicago.

Her husband, Frank Maltese, was the Cicero township assessor and a mid-level mobster; among other duties, he was the driver for Cicero town president Henry Klosak. Frank Maltese was also a bookmaker for the mob and died in 1991. In 1993, Loren-Maltese became town president following the death of Henry Klosak.

Loren-Maltese was well liked by many residents for her attempts at community improvement. She was particularly well known for her efforts in helping senior citizens with free services.

In 2002 she was found guilty of helping to steal $12 million of the city's funds in an insurance scam. She was sentenced to eight years in a federal prison in California, and designated Prisoner #13706-424. She was released on February 26, 2010.

== See also ==
- List of town presidents of Cicero, Illinois
