= Thomas J. Spargo =

American judge

Thomas J. Spargo is an American former judge and disbarred attorney from the state of New York. Spargo is notable for having been removed from a state court judgeship in 2006, and for being convicted of federal attempted bribery and attempted extortion charges in 2009.

Spargo, who resides in East Berne, New York, was elected to the post of Berne Town Justice in 1999. A Republican, he is also "a former top election law attorney who went to bat in Florida for George W. Bush after the disputed 2000 presidential election". Spargo was elected to the New York Supreme Court (a trial-level court) in the Third Judicial District in 2001. While Spargo's chambers were located in Albany, New York, he heard Ulster County cases.

In 2006, the New York State Commission on Judicial Conduct issued a determination that Spargo should be removed from the bench. The Commission found that Spargo had engaged in improper political activity in his 1999 campaign for Berne Town Justice. Spargo opted to accept the determination and did not appeal it to the New York Court of Appeals. Spargo was also barred from ever holding judicial office again in the state of New York.

Spargo was indicted on federal corruption charges on December 10, 2008. He was alleged to have sought bribes from attorneys who had cases in his courtroom; he allegedly did so because he needed money to pay legal fees in connection with judicial misconduct charges. On August 27, 2009, Spargo was convicted by a federal jury of attempted extortion and attempted solicitation of a bribe for pressuring a lawyer to contribute $10,000 to his defense fund. On December 21, 2009, he was sentenced to 27 months in prison. Spargo was also disbarred in December 2009.
