= Mary Kincaid-Chauncey =

American politician

Clark County (Nevada) Commissioner from District B
- In office 1997–2005
- Preceded by: Jay Bingham
- Succeeded by: Tom Collins

Personal details
- Party: Democratic

Mary J. Kincaid-Chauncey is a former Democratic politician from Nevada. Kincaid-Chauncey served on the Clark County Commission until she was defeated for reelection and subsequently convicted of federal corruption charges.

== Political career ==
Kincaid-Chauncey was a flower shop owner from North Las Vegas. She served on the North Las Vegas City Council from 1978 to 1981 and again from 1984 to 1996. In 1996 she won a seat Clark County Commission as a Democrat. She was reelected in 2000.

Although actively under investigation for her involvement in Operation G-Sting at the time, in 2004 Kincaid-Chauncey ran for reelection to the Clark County Commission. She finished third in the Democratic primary behind John Bonaventura and the eventual winner, state Assemblyman Tom Collins.

== "Operation G-Sting" Involvement and Conviction ==
Along with former Clark County commissioners Erin Kenny, Dario Herrera, and several other local elected officials, Kincaid-Chauncey became embroiled in a corruption investigation involving a Las Vegas strip club which became known as Operation G-Sting. In May 2006 Kincaid-Chauncey was convicted of conspiracy, wire fraud and extortion stemming from charges that he and the other officials "used their public offices to further the interests of Michael Galardi, a strip club owner in Las Vegas. They solicited and accepted money, property, and services directly from Galardi and through co-defendant Lance Malone, another former county commissioner. The evidence demonstrated that members of the conspiracy concealed the payments they received from Galardi and failed to disclose the payments as required by law and their fiduciary duties as county commissioners." In August 2006 Kincaid-Chauncey was sentenced to 30 months in federal prison, fined $7,600 and ordered to forfeit $19,000 in assets. Although Kincaid-Chauncey's sentence was considerably lighter than Herrera's, unlike Herrera she attempted to appeal them.

In January 2007 Kincaid-Chauncey began serving her sentence at the Federal Correctional Complex near Victorville, California, a facility she requested due to its proximity to Las Vegas. She was released in March 2009.
