= Dario Herrera (politician) =

American politician (born 1973)

Clark County Commissioner from District G
- In office 1999–2003
- Preceded by: Lorraine Hunt
- Succeeded by: Rory Reid

Member of the Nevada Assembly from the 16th district
- In office 1997–1999
- Preceded by: Rick Bennett
- Succeeded by: Kelly Thomas

Personal details
- Born: June 27, 1973 (age 53) Miami, Florida, U.S.
- Party: Democratic
- Education: University of Nevada, Las Vegas

Dario Herrera (born June 27, 1973) is an American former politician from Nevada. A Democrat, Herrera was considered a rising star until his defeat for election to the United States House of Representatives in 2002 and his subsequent convictions on federal public corruption charges.

== Political career ==
Herrera grew up in Miami, and moved to Las Vegas in 1991 to attend the University of Nevada, Las Vegas. Herrera began his political career in 1994 as campaign coordinator for Nevada Gov. Bob Miller. At the age of 23 Herrera was elected to the Nevada Assembly in 1996 and then to the Clark County Commission two years later. During this period he was told by then-Secretary of Housing and Urban Development Henry Cisneros that he was a "star" and "going places".

During the 2000 presidential election, Herrera was a Nevada state co-chair of GoreNet. GoreNet was a group that supported the Al Gore campaign with a focus on grassroots and online organizing as well as hosting small dollar donor events.

In 2002, Herrera won the Democratic nomination in the newly created Nevada 3rd Congressional District. However during the campaign it was revealed that Herrera received a $50,000 contract from the Las Vegas Housing Authority "to do public relations work that the authority board members never knew about". Herrera lost the election to Republican state Sen. Jon Porter.

== "Operation G-Sting" involvement and conviction ==
Along with former Clark County commissioners Erin Kenny, Mary Kincaid-Chauncey, and several other local elected officials, Herrera became embroiled in a corruption investigation involving a Las Vegas strip club which became known as Operation G-Sting. In May 2006 Herrera was convicted of 17 counts of conspiracy, wire fraud and extortion stemming from charges that he and the other officials "used their public offices to further the interests of Michael Galardi, a strip club owner in Las Vegas. They solicited and accepted money, property, and services directly from Galardi and through co-defendant Lance Malone, another former county commissioner. The evidence demonstrated that members of the conspiracy concealed the payments they received from Galardi and failed to disclose the payments as required by law and their fiduciary duties as county commissioners". In August 2006 Herrera was sentenced to 50 months in federal prison, fined $15,000 and ordered to forfeit $60,000 in assets. Herrera declined to appeal his convictions.

In January 2007, Herrera began serving his sentence at the Florence Federal Correctional Complex in Florence, Colorado. Herrera's sentence was originally scheduled to end in early 2011. He was released in spring 2009.

Party political offices
Preceded by None (district created)	Democratic Party nominee, Nevada's 3rd congressional district 2002 (lost)	Succeeded by Tom Gallagher
