= Operation G-Sting =

US federal investigation into bribery

Operation G-Sting, also called Strippergate, and referencing the G-string costume often worn by strippers and showgirls, was an FBI investigation into bribes and unreported campaign contributions taken by Clark County Commissioners in Clark County, Nevada (home of Las Vegas) and city council members in San Diego, California. These bribes were from the same lobbyist, representing two sets of strip clubs, and was the result of strip club owners Rick Rizzolo and Mike Galardi trying to remove local "no touch" laws affecting the girls in their clubs.

A separate arms dealing investigation was started after the Operation G-Sting investigation, and ended around the same time.

== History ==
The case ended in 2006 when 17 defendants pleaded guilty to various offenses. As a part of the plea bargain Rick Rizzolo was ordered to sell the Crazy Horse Too within one year.

== Political corruption convictions ==
The investigation resulted in the convictions of 17 defendants including:

1. Clark County Commissioner Lynette Boggs McDonald (R) pled no contest to filing a false statement and campaign funding irregularities. (2009)
2. Clark County Commissioner Mary Kincaid-Chauncey (D) was sentenced to 30 months in federal prison, fined $7,600 and ordered to forfeit $19,000 in assets. (2006)
3. Clark County Commissioner Dario Herrera (D) was sentenced to 50 months in federal prison, fined $15,000 and ordered to forfeit $60,000 in assets. (2006)
4. Clark County Commissioner Erin Kenny (D) was sentenced to 2.5 years in prison. (2006)
5. Clark County Commissioner Lance Matthew Malone (R) pleaded guilty to violating federal racketeering laws for bribing commissioners. (2006)

In San Diego, California, three city council members were accused of corruption: Ralph Inzunza, Michael Zucchet and Charles L. Lewis though Lewis died of unrelated health issues prior to trial. Inzunza and Zucchet were both convicted, though Zucchet was later cleared of all charges due to lack of evidence.

== Main players ==
- Jack Galardi – Businessman and father of Michael
- Michael Galardi – Strip club owner of Jaguars and Cheetah's strip clubs. Galardi admitted that he had paid various public officials between $200,000 and $400,000.
- Lance Malone – Lobbyist, former county commissioner (Clark County, Nevada).
- Tony Montegna – Undercover informant, key witness
- Rick Rizzolo – Strip club owner
- Charles Tappe – Street arms dealer
- John D'Intino – Strip club manager and friend of Jack Galardi

== See also ==
- Cheetah's - Galardi's club
- Crazy Horse Too - Rick Rizzolo's club
