= Hobbs Act =

United States federal law

Hobbs Act of 1946
- Long title: An Act to amend the Act entitled “An Act to protect trade and commerce against interference by violence, threats, coercion, or intimidation”, approved June 18, 1934
- Enacted by: the 79th United States Congress

Citations
- Public law: Pub. L. 79–486
- Statutes at Large: 60 Stat. 420

Codification
- Acts amended: Anti-Racketeering Act of 1934
- Titles amended: 18
- U.S.C. sections amended: 18 U.S.C. § 1951

United States Supreme Court cases
- United States v. Green, 350 U.S. 415 (1956); Stirone v. United States, 361 U.S. 212 (1960); Callanan v. United States, 364 U.S. 587 (1961); United States v. Enmons, 410 U.S. 396 (1973); United States v. Culbert, 435 U.S. 371 (1978); United States v. Gillock, 445 U.S. 360 (1980); McCormick v. United States, 500 U.S. 257 (1991); Evans v. United States, 504 U.S. 255 (1992); Scheidler v. National Organization for Women, 537 U.S. 393 (2003); Scheidler v. National Organization for Women, 547 U.S. 9 (2006); Wilkie v. Robbins, 551 U.S. 537 (2007); Sekhar v. United States, 570 U.S. 729 (2013); Ocasio v. United States, No. 14-361, 578 U.S. ___ (2016); Taylor v. United States, No. 14-6166, 579 U.S. ___ (2016); McDonnell v. United States, No. 15-474, 579 U.S. ___ (2016); United States v. Davis, No. 18-431, 588 U.S. ___ (2019); United States v. Taylor, No. 20-1459, 596 U.S. ___ (2022)

The Hobbs Act, codified at 18 U.S.C. § 1951, is a United States federal law enacted in 1946 that makes it a crime to commit, attempt to commit, or conspire to commit robbery, attempted robbery, or extortion that affects interstate or foreign commerce. The Act is named for United States Representative Sam Hobbs (D-AL).

The statute, despite being conceived and enacted as an anti-racketeering measure in disputes between labor and management, is frequently used in connection with cases involving public corruption, commercial disputes, and corruption directed at members of labor unions.

== Text ==
(a) Whoever in any way or degree obstructs, delays, or affects commerce or the movement of any article or commodity in commerce, by robbery or extortion or attempts or conspires so to do, or commits or threatens physical violence to any person or property in furtherance of a plan or purpose to do anything in violation of this section shall be fined under this title or imprisoned not more than twenty years, or both.

(b) As used in this section—

(1) The term “robbery” means the unlawful taking or obtaining of personal property from the person or in the presence of another, against his will, by means of actual or threatened force, or violence, or fear of injury, immediate or future, to his person or property, or property in his custody or possession, or the person or property of a relative or member of his family or of anyone in his company at the time of the taking or obtaining.
(2) The term “extortion” means the obtaining of property from another, with his consent, induced by wrongful use of actual or threatened force, violence, or fear, or under color of official right.
(3) The term “commerce” means commerce within the District of Columbia, or any Territory or Possession of the United States; all commerce between any point in a State, Territory, Possession, or the District of Columbia and any point outside thereof; all commerce between points within the same State through any place outside such State; and all other commerce over which the United States has jurisdiction.

(c) This section shall not be construed to repeal, modify or affect section 17 of Title 15, sections 52, 101–115, 151–166 of Title 29 or sections 151–188 of Title 45.

== Jurisdictional element ==
In interpreting the Hobbs Act, the Supreme Court has held that the statute employs the fullest extent of federal authority under the Commerce Clause. Thus, the lower federal courts have recognized that an actual effect on commerce is sufficient to satisfy the federal jurisdictional element even if it is slight or de minimis.

The government will often use the depletion of assets theory to prove the jurisdictional element. Under this theory, interstate commerce is affected when an enterprise, which either is actively engaged in interstate commerce or customarily purchases items in interstate commerce, has its assets depleted through extortion, thereby curtailing the victim's potential as a purchaser of such goods. While the courts have interpreted the jurisdictional element liberally, it is not a formality; courts have drawn a distinction under the depletion of assets theory between individuals and businesses. While depletion of a business' assets is usually sufficient to show an effect on interstate commerce, depletion of an individual's assets generally is not. Representatively, the Second Circuit reasoned in United States v. Perrotta (2002) that making no distinction between individuals and businesses would bring under the ambit of the Hobbs Act every conceivable robbery or extortion.

== Extortion by fear ==
The Hobbs Act covers extortionate threats of physical, economic and informational harm (i.e. blackmail). To be "wrongful," a threat of physical violence must instill some degree of duress in the target of the extortion. Furthermore, it is unlikely an economic threat is "wrongful" for Hobbs Act purposes unless a defendant purports to have the power to harm another person economically and that person believes the defendant will use that power to deprive him of something to which he is legally entitled. Finally, in the context of blackmail, a Hobbs Act prosecution is probably proper if there is no nexus between the information the defendant threatens to expose and the defendant's claim against the property of the target.

== Extortion under color of law ==
The Hobbs Act also reaches extortionate acts by public officials acting under the color of law. A public official commits extortion under the color of law when he obtains a payment to which he is not entitled knowing that it was made in exchange for official acts. § 1951 therefore not only embraces the same conduct the federal bribery statute (18 U.S.C. § 201) prohibits, it goes further in two ways:

1. § 1951 is not limited to federal public officials.
2. The government need only prove a public official agreed to take some official action in exchange for payment as opportunities arose to do so (i.e. a "stream of benefits" theory) to sustain a § 1951 charge whereas, under § 201, the government must prove an express quid pro quo (or something approaching one).

It is irrelevant whether the public official in fact intended to hold up his or her end of the bargain—it is enough that the official had knowledge of the payor's intent to buy official acts. Notwithstanding its potentially broad reach, § 1951 is narrower than § 201 in at least one important respect: Under § 201, both the official receiving a bribe and the person bribing him have committed a federal crime, but, under § 1951, a payor of a bribe is most likely not guilty as an accomplice to extortion.

== Activity unrelated to robbery or extortion ==
On February 28, 2006, the Supreme Court of the United States decided Scheidler v. National Organization for Women. The Court's unanimous opinion held that physical violence unrelated to robbery or extortion falls outside the scope of the Hobbs Act, and that the United States Congress did not intend the Act to create a "freestanding physical violence offense." For that reason, the Court held, abortion clinics could not use the Hobbs Act to obtain an injunction against anti-abortion protesters.

On June 26, 2013, in Sekhar v. United States, the Court ruled that threats to a public official in order to get him to use his non-transferable property (in this case, a general counsel's recommendation to a government official with respect to approving an investment) in a certain way did not constitute "the obtaining of property from another" within the meaning of the Act. The Court reasoned that the defendant did not seek to "obtain" the recommendation from the attorney, but instead wanted the attorney to make the recommendation a certain way, which is the crime of coercion (not proscribed by the Hobbs Act), not extortion (proscribed by the Hobbs Act).

== See also ==
- United States v. Enmons
- United States v. Davis
- McDonnell v. United States
- Taylor v. United States (2016)
