= Travel Act =

United States federal anti-racketeering law

- Long title: An Act to amend title 18, United States Code, to prohibit travel or transportation in commerce in aid of racketeering enterprises
- Enacted by: the 87th United States Congress

Citations
- Public law: 87-228

Codification
- U.S.C. sections created: 18 U.S.C. § 1952

Legislative history
- Signed into law by President John F. Kennedy on September 13, 1961

United States Supreme Court cases
- United States v. Nardello, 393 U.S. 286 (1969); Rewis v. United States, 401 U.S. 808 (1971); United States v. Gillock, 445 U.S. 360 (1980)

The Travel Act, 18 U.S.C. § 1952, is a Federal criminal statute which forbids the use of the U.S. mail, or interstate or foreign travel, for the purpose of engaging in certain specified criminal acts.

== Provisions and scope ==
=== Elements of the crime ===
Subsection (a) of the statute sets forth the elements of an offense under the Travel Act. The acts prohibited are interstate or foreign travel, or use of the mails or "any facility in interstate or foreign commerce", for the purpose of distributing the proceeds of an unlawful activity, committing a crime of violence in furtherance of an unlawful activity, or to "promote, manage, establish, carry on" an unlawful activity. The offense is completed when a person engages in travel or use of the mails with the intent of committing any of the aforementioned acts, and then goes on to commit or attempt to commit one of the prohibited acts. This has the effect of making the act of traveling (or using the mail) in furtherance of certain types of crime a separate indictable offense from the underlying crime(s) the person is committing.

=== Definition of "unlawful activity" ===
Subsection (b) of the statute defines "unlawful activity" for the purposes of the Travel Act. The activities specified in this subsection include illegal gambling, liquor on which the Federal excise tax has not been paid, controlled substance offenses, prostitution offenses, extortion, bribery, or arson which violate either Federal law or the laws of the state in which they are committed. The inclusion of state-level crime in the Act is important because it effectively federalizes certain state laws which may not have analogous provisions at the Federal level. For example, some states have laws prohibiting commercial bribery (bribery which does not involve government officials), but there is no Federal statute which directly addresses this issue. However, travel or use of the mails in furtherance of violations of state commercial bribery laws can be prosecuted by the United States Department of Justice in Federal court.

The definition of "unlawful activities" also includes certain specific violations of federal law, including money laundering offenses under the Money Laundering Control Act and violations of certain financial reporting requirements of the Bank Secrecy Act, as amended by the USA PATRIOT ACT.

== Use and interpretation of the act ==
The U.S. Department of Justice has used the Travel Act as a complementary statute in the prosecution of some corruption cases under the Foreign Corrupt Practices Act (FCPA), and the Federal courts have interpreted the Travel Act rather broadly. For example, in the case against businessman Frederic Bourke, Judge Shira Scheindlin instructed the jury that a "facility in interstate or foreign commerce" could include anything that crosses state or national borders, including telecommunications, and that conviction under the Travel Act requires proof that the defendant used a facility of commerce "for the purpose of facilitating the unlawful activity" but that the underlying offense (in Bourke's case, bribery of a foreign official) need not have been actually completed.

Likewise, courts have applied the Travel Act to commercial bribery overseas in cases where state law prohibited such activities. One example of this was the case against Control Components, Inc. (CCI), a California corporation, which stood accused of violating both the FCPA and the Travel Act by bribing government officials and employees of private companies. California Penal Code Section 641.3 prohibits commercial bribery. When the company's lawyers challenged the extraterritorial application of the Travel Act, U.S. District Judge James V. Selna held that all elements of the Travel Act violation had been completed within California and that the offense "was complete the moment Defendants used a channel of foreign commerce allegedly to offer a 'corrupt payment' to an employee and thereafter effectuated a payment to that employee."

At least one commentator has noted that Travel Act violations could be used as predicate acts under the Racketeer Influenced and Corrupt Organizations Act, since it is mentioned in the definition of "racketeering activity" in 18 U.S.C. § 1961.

== See also ==
- Federal prosecution of public corruption in the United States
- Foreign trade of the United States
- International Trade Administration
- Mail and wire fraud
- Mann Act
- United States Travel Service
- United States Travel and Tourism Administration
