= List of federal political scandals in the United States =

This article provides a list of political scandals that involve officials from the government of the United States, sorted from oldest to most recent.

== Scope and organization of political scandals ==
This article is organized by presidential terms in order, older to recent, and then divided into scandals of the federal Executive, Legislative, and Judicial branches of government. Members of both parties are listed under the term of the president in office at the time the scandal took place, even though they may not be connected with the presiding president.

In this article, the term "politician" (a person who is professionally involved in politics) includes not only those elected, but also party officials, candidates for office, their staffs and appointees. Please note that every president directly selects, appoints or hires several thousand people. Each of those selects thousands more. Private citizens should only be mentioned when they are closely linked to the scandal or politician, such as Jack Abramoff. This list also does not include crimes that occur outside the politician's tenure (such as before or after their term in office) unless they specifically stem from acts made while in office and discovered later.

Scandal is defined as "loss of or damage to reputation caused by actual or apparent violation of morality or propriety". Scandals are separate from 'controversies', (which implies two differing points of view) and 'unpopularity'. Many decisions are controversial, many decisions are unpopular, that alone does not make them scandals. Breaking the law is a scandal. The finding of a court is the sole method used to determine a violation of law, but it is not the sole method of determining a scandal. Also included as scandals are politicians who resign, quit, run, or commit suicide while being investigated or threatened with investigation.

Notoriety is a major determinant of a scandal, that is, the amount of press dedicated to it. Misunderstandings, breaches of ethics, unproven crimes or cover-ups may or may not result in inclusion depending on the standing of the accused, the amount of publicity generated, and the seriousness of the crime, if any. Drunk driving may be a conviction, but is usually too minor and too common to mention unless there are multiple convictions and/or jail time.

Given the political nature of Congress in which the leading party has determining power, politicians who are rebuked, denounced, censured, admonished, condemned, suspended, reprimanded, found in contempt, found to have acted improperly, or used poor judgement are not included unless the scandal is exceptional or leads to expulsion or conviction.

== Government under the Articles of Confederation (1777–1789) ==
- Thomas Conway and Horatio Gates created a movement or conspiracy, known as the Conway Cabal, to remove George Washington as Commander of the Continental Army. (1777–1778)
- Silas Deane was appointed by the Continental Congress to be Ambassador to France. He was accused of mismanagement and treason. As he was attempting to clear himself of the charges, he died suddenly. The charges were eventually reversed or dropped. (1777)

== George Washington administrations (1789–1797) ==
=== Legislative branch ===
- Senator William Blount (Democratic-Republican-TN) was expelled from the Senate for conspiring of his own accord to have Great Britain take over Spanish-controlled Louisiana and Florida in order to boost local land prices. (1797)

== John Adams administration (1797–1801) ==
=== Executive branch ===
- The XYZ Affair was the French seizure of over 300 US ships and demands for bribes and apologies, which led to a Quasi-War causing the US Congress to issue the famous phrase, "Millions for defense, sir, but not one cent for tribute!". Real war was averted by treaty. (1798–1800)

=== Legislative branch ===
- Matthew Lyon (Democratic-Republican KY) was the first Congressman recommended for censure for spitting on Ralph Griswold (Federalist-CT). The censure failed to pass. Also found guilty of violating John Adams's Alien and Sedition Acts and sentenced to four months in jail, during which he was re-elected. (1798)

== Thomas Jefferson administrations (1801–1809) ==
=== Executive branch ===
- General James Wilkinson was appointed to be Governor of the upper Louisiana Purchase. He then conspired with Spain to get Kentucky to secede from the Union in order to allow shipping on the Mississippi to reach New Orleans. (1787–1811)
- Aaron Burr and the New Empire (Southwest) Burr conspiracy (1804–1807) – Burr allegedly tried to seize a large part of the Louisiana Purchase and establish his own country. He was arrested for treason, but was acquitted for lack of evidence. (1807)
- Aaron Burr dueled with Alexander Hamilton. Hamilton died of wounds received during the duel. (1804)

=== Judicial branch ===
- Samuel Chase, the Supreme Court Justice appointed by George Washington, was impeached for political favoritism and acquitted in 1805.
- John Pickering, a federal judge appointed by George Washington, was impeached and convicted in absentia by the US Senate for drunkenness and use of profanity on the bench. (1804)
- Benjamin Sebastian US Court of Appeals Judge, was accused in the Spanish Conspiracy, of being a paid agent of Spain. He resigned in disgrace. (1806)

== James Monroe administrations (1817–1825) ==
=== Legislative branch ===
- Corrupt Bargain was a supposed bargain by John Quincy Adams with Henry Clay. (1824) In the United States presidential election of 1824, in which John Quincy Adams was elected by the House of Representatives after Andrew Jackson won the most popular and electoral votes but failed to receive a majority. The matter was decided by the House of Representatives.

== Andrew Jackson administrations (1829–1837) ==
see Andrew Jackson administration controversies

=== Executive branch ===
- Samuel Swartwout was appointed by President Andrew Jackson to the New York City Collector's Office. At the end of his term he had embezzled $1.225 million in customs receipts and used the money to purchase land. He fled to Europe to avoid prosecution.
- Margaret O'Neill Eaton, the wife of Secretary of War John H. Eaton, was a central figure in the Petticoat Affair which involved accusations that she had engaged in an extramarital affair, and her social ostracism by the wives of other Cabinet members led by Floride Calhoun, the wife of Vice President John C. Calhoun.

=== Legislative branch ===
- Robert Potter North Carolina Congressman, resigned from Congress after castrating two men he believed were having an affair with his wife. (1831) Later, in North Carolina, he was expelled from its legislature for cheating at cards or for pulling a gun and a knife during a card game. (1835)

== John Tyler administration (1841–1845) ==
=== Legislative branch ===
- Charles F. Mitchell (R-NY) US Representative from the 33rd District, was convicted of forgery, sentenced to one year in prison and fined, though he was paroled early due to poor health. (1841)

== Zachary Taylor administration (1849–1850) ==
=== Executive branch ===
- George W. Crawford (Whig-GA), Secretary of War in the Cabinet of President Zachary Taylor (Whig), was the center of the Galphin Affair land scandal with the help of Reverdy Johnson (Whig) Attorney General and William M. Meredith (Whig) Secretary of the Treasury, in which Crawford defrauded the federal government of $191,353. (1849)

== Franklin Pierce administration (1853–1857) ==
=== Legislative branch ===
- Preston Brooks (D-SC) US Representative and fervent advocate of slavery, beat abolitionist Senator Charles Sumner (R-MA), until his cane broke, leaving him bleeding and unconscious on the floor of the House of Representatives. (1856)

== James Buchanan administration (1857–1861) ==
Executive branch

- President Buchanan called out a detachment of U.S. Marines from the Washington Navy Yard, the only federal troops in the immediate area: 81 privates, 11 sergeants, 13 corporals, and 1 bugler, armed with seven howitzers. The Marines left for Harper's Ferry on the regular 3:30 train, arriving about 10 PM. Israel Greene was in charge. see John Brown's raid on Harpers Ferry

=== Legislative branch ===
- US Representative Orsamus B. Matteson (R-NY), faced an allegation of having defamed the character of the US House by declaring that a majority of its members were 'purchasable'. He himself was then accused of accepting money in exchange for supporting a Minnesota land bill. The House recommendation that he be expelled was tabled and a recommendation of censure was brought up, but before it could be passed, Matteson resigned. (1857)

== Abraham Lincoln (R) administration (1861–1865) ==
=== Executive branch ===
- Simon Cameron (R), Lincoln's Secretary of War, resigned in 1862 due to corruption charges. His behavior was so notorious that Congressman Thaddeus Stevens, when discussing Cameron's honesty with Lincoln, told him that "I don't think that he would steal a red hot stove." When Cameron demanded Stevens retract this statement, Stevens told Lincoln "I believe I told you he would not steal a red-hot stove. I will now take that back." (1860–1862)
- Caleb Lyon (R) was appointed Governor of the Idaho Territory. An audit revealed that he had embezzled $46,418 in federal funds intended for the Nez Perce Indians. He died before prosecution. (1866)

=== Legislative branch ===
- Jesse D. Bright (D-IN) US Senator and Pro Tem President of the US Senate, was known as a leading southern sympathizer. When it was discovered that he had written a letter to President Jefferson Davis aiding him in his pursuit of firearms for the Confederacy, it was taken to be an act of treason. Bright was then expelled from the Senate. (1861)
- James F. Simmons (R-RI) US Senator had confirmed corruption charges against him reported by the Senate Judiciary Committee and the charges were then referred to the full Senate for action on July 14, 1862. The Senate adjourned three days later without acting. Before it could reconvene, Simmons resigned on September 5, 1862.
- Lovell Harrison Rousseau (R-KY) US Representative assaulted Iowa Representative Josiah Bushnell Grinnell on June 14, 1866, with his iron handled cane until it broke. He was reprimanded by the House of Representatives, and resigned, but was elected again to fill his own vacancy. (1866)

== Andrew Johnson (D) administration (1865–1869) ==
=== Executive branch ===
- President Andrew Johnson (D/National Union) was impeached for violating the Tenure of Office Act. He was acquitted by one vote. (1868)

== Ulysses S. Grant (R) administrations (1869–1877) ==
=== Executive branch ===
- William Belknap (R) United States Secretary of War, resigned just before he was impeached by the United States House of Representatives for bribery. (1876)
- Schuyler Colfax (R-IN) Vice President under Republican U. S. Grant invested money in the Crédit Mobilier Scandal and failed to mention $10,000 they invested in his next campaign. He was examined by the House, but his term ended before he could be impeached. (1873)
- Whiskey Ring was a massive corruption of Ulysses S. Grant's (R) administration involving whiskey taxes, bribery and kickbacks ending with 110 convictions. (1875)
1. Orville E. Babcock (R), a personal secretary to Grant, was indicted in the Whiskey Ring scandal and ten days later in the Safe Burglary Conspiracy. He was acquitted both times.
2. John J. McDonald (R), Supervisor of the Internal Revenue Service, was convicted and sentenced to three years.
3. W.O. Avery, Chief Clerk of the Treasury Department, was convicted.
4. Eastern Wisconsin Federal Attorney Levi Hubbell (R) was suspended from office for his involvement with the Whiskey Ring through contact with Milwaukee brewers. (1875)
- William Adams Richardson (R), U.S. Secretary of the Treasury, hired John B. Sanborn to collect unpaid taxes, some of which were used in a kickback scheme. Though not illegal, Congressional outrage forced Richardson to resign. The actions were made illegal a few months later and are now called the Sanborn Incident. (1874)
- Black Friday – When financiers Jay Gould and James Fisk tried to corner the gold market by getting Ulysses S. Grant's brother-in-law Abel Corbin to convince Grant to appoint General Daniel Butterfield as Assistant to the Secretary of the Treasury, where he could then give them insider information. (1869)
- George M. Robeson, Grant's Secretary of the Navy, was admonished by the House for gross misconduct and corruption in relation to his dealings with Alexander Cattel. (1876)
- Salary Grab Act was the act that increased the salaries of the President, Congress and the Supreme Court. (1873)
- Columbus Delano, the Secretary of the Interior under Grant, resigned after allegedly taking bribes in order to secure fraudulent land grants.

=== Legislative branch ===
- Crédit Mobilier of America scandal:
1. Oakes Ames (R-MA) bribed Congress with Union Pacific stock.
2. James Brooks (D-NY) also implicated; both were censured for their involvement. (1872)
3. James W. Patterson (R-NH) US Senator, was found to have given false testimony to both the House and Senate Ethics Committees, both of whom found him guilty of bribery in the Crédit Mobilier Scandal. They both recommended his expulsion from the Senate, but Patterson's term expired before such action could be taken. (1873)
4. See also William Belknap (R) Secretary of War under Republican U. S. Grant
5. See also Schuyler Colfax (R-IN) Vice President under Republican U. S. Grant
- Alexander Caldwell (R-KS) US Senator, was elected to the US Senate. It was discovered that his rival candidate, Thomas Carney, dropped out of the race, admitting that he had accepted a bribe of $15,000 to leave the race allowing Caldwell to win. He was impeached and the US Senate declared that Caldwell had not been "duly and legally elected" and moved to expel him. Before a vote could be taken, Caldwell resigned (1873)
- Samuel C. Pomeroy (R-KS) US Senator, was being investigated for bribery and buying votes. A motion to impeach and expel Pomeroy was made, but arrived on the last day of Pomeroy's term, who was not re-elected. (1873)
- John T. Deweese (R-NC) US Representative, was accused of accepting a $500 bribe for recommending a cadet be appointed to the US Naval Academy. On February 28, 1870, he abruptly resigned. Two days later, the House of Representatives censured him, 170–0. (1870)
- Benjamin Franklin Whittemore (R-SC) US Representative, was found to have sold an appointment to the US Naval Academy. He was found guilty and forced to resign.(1870)
- James G. Blaine (R-ME) US Representative, faced an allegation of selling $64,000 of worthless Union Pacific Railroad bonds. The House Committee of the Judiciary ordered an investigation. A month later, he resigned. (1876)

=== Judicial branch ===
- Mark Delahay (R) a U.S. District Judge of Kansas and cofounder of the Republican Party, was impeached by the United States House of Representatives on February 28, 1873, for "intoxication off the bench as well as on the bench", He resigned two months later. (1873)
- Richard Busteed (R) US Judge from the Northern District of Alabama, spent much of his time at home in New York though serving in Alabama. Southern sympathizers brought charges against him for non-residence, failure to hold court and improper use of his position. To avoid being removed from office, he resigned before impeachment. (1874)
- Levi Hubbell (R) US Attorney for the Eastern District of Wisconsin, accused of corruption for failing to prosecute whisky distributors who were bribing US Revenue agents. Forced to resign. (1875)
- William Story (R) Judge of the US District Court for the Western District of Arkansas appointed by Republican Ulysses S. Grant. Graft and corruption in the court became so bad that Story appeared before the House Judiciary Committee. He resigned soon after. (1874)
- Charles Taylor Sherman (R) Federal Judge of the Northern District of Ohio, was alleged to have demanded stocks in exchange for favorable rulings and threatened adverse rulings if they were not paid. He resigned before impeachment began. (1873)

== Rutherford B. Hayes (R) administration (1877–1881) ==
=== Executive branch ===
- Ezra Ayres Hayt, the Commissioner of Indian Affairs under Rutherford B. Hayes, was forced to resign by Interior Secretary Carl Schurz due to allegations of rampant corruption. (1880)

=== Judicial branch ===
- US District Court for the Eastern District of Louisiana Judge Edward Henry Durell (R) was impeached for alleged drunkenness, corruption, and election-rigging. He resigned before trial. (1879)

== James A. Garfield (R) administration (1881) ==
- Garfield's Presidential term ran from March 4, 1881 – September 19, 1881 when he was assassinated by Charles J. Guiteau. He was succeeded by his Vice-President Chester A. Arthur (R).

== Chester A. Arthur (R) administration (1881–1885) ==
=== Executive branch ===
- Nehemiah G. Ordway (R) was appointed Governor of Dakota Territory and was removed from office for corrupt practices. (1884)
- Levi Jarrad (R) was appointed US Postmaster for New Brunswick, NJ by President Chester A. Arthur (R) in 1881. He was sentenced to 10 years in prison for forgery in 1884.

== Grover Cleveland (D) administration (1885–1889) ==
=== Legislative branch ===
- Utah Territorial Delegate George Q. Cannon (R) was refused his seat due to a conviction for unlawful cohabitation (polygamy), for which he served nearly six months in Utah's federal penitentiary. (1888)
- SC Representative Robert Smalls (R-SC) was charged with accepting a $5,000 bribe in relation to a government printing contract and found guilty. (1877)

== William McKinley (R) administration (1897–1901) ==
=== Executive branch ===
- Oregon US Federal District Attorney John Hicklin Hall (R) was appointed by Republican President William McKinley and ordered to investigate the Oregon land fraud scandal. He was accused of failing to prosecute land companies engaging in fraudulent activities, and blackmailing his political opponents. On February 8, 1908, a jury found Hall guilty. (1907)
- Alexander McKenzie (R) Republican National Committeeman, was appointed receiver of the Anvil Creek gold mines in Alaska. He took over production and kept the gold it produced. He was then ordered to return the gold he had collected, an order which he refused. He was found guilty of two counts of contempt of court and sentenced to one year in jail. (1901)

=== Legislative branch ===
- Charles Henry Dietrich (R-NE) US Senator, before he took office Dietrich was charged with bribery for accepting money to appoint Jacob Fisher to be a US Postmaster. He was charged with conspiracy to receive a bribe, accepting a bribe and profiting by the leasing of a building to the government. Before the trial could begin, the judge held that Dietrich could not be prosecuted because the alleged bribery occurred after he was elected, but before Dietrich was sworn in as a US Senator. All charges were then dropped. (1901)

== Theodore Roosevelt (R) administrations (1901–1909) ==
=== Legislative branch ===
- William A. Clark (D-MT) US Senator, was elected amid allegations of rampant bribery. Though seated, the Senate Committee on Privileges and Elections unanimously concluded he was not entitled to his seat and recommended a vote to remove him. He resigned in 1900 rather than be voted out, thus creating a vacancy. In 1901, he was re-elected to fill the vacancy that he had just created by a Montana legislature now filled with winning candidates he had already financially supported. (1900)
- William Miller Jenkins (R) Governor of the Oklahoma Territory was appointed by Republican President William McKinley in May 1901. Jenkins was investigated both for discrepancies in the dispensation of lands from newly opened Indian lands and his appointment of officials concerning the Oklahoma Sanitarium Company which held included $10,000 in stock to Jenkins for contracts with the Oklahoma Territory. When McKinley was assassinated Republican President Theodore Roosevelt assumed office and an investigation by the Interior Department of Jenkins revealed nothing. Nonetheless, in November. Roosevelt removed Jenkins from office for his "indiscreet" and inappropriate role" in the matter. (1901)
- John Goodnow (R) US Consulate General of Shanghai, China, was appointed by Republican President William McKinley, when accused of corruption, he resigned. (1902)
- John Hipple Mitchell (R-OR) US Senator, was involved with the Oregon land fraud scandal, for which he was indicted and convicted while a sitting U.S. Senator. He died before sentencing. (1905)
- Joseph R. Burton (R-KS) US Senator, was convicted of bribery in 1904 on the charge of illegally receiving compensation for services rendered before a federal department and served five months in prison. (1904)
- Henry B. Cassel (R-PA) US Representative, was convicted of fraud related to the construction of the Pennsylvania State Capitol in 1909.

=== Judicial branch ===
- John Hicklin Hall (R) US District Attorney for Oregon, appointed by President McKinley, was convicted of not prosecuting suspects and then blackmailing them during the Oregon land fraud scandal. (1903)

== William Howard Taft (R) administration (1909–1913) ==
=== Legislative branch ===
- William Lorimer (R-IL) US Senator, also known as the "blond boss of Chicago", was expelled from the U.S. Senate in 1912 for accepting bribes.
- Ralph Cameron (R-AZ) US Senator, attempted to control access to the Grand Canyon by buying mining rights to adjacent lands. (1912)
- William Willett Jr. (D-NY), US Representative, was indicted on charges of bribery for paying State Democratic Party leaders for a seat on the NY State Supreme Court. He was convicted of conspiracy, corrupt practices and bribery and served 14 months in prison (1912)

=== Judicial branch ===
- Pennsylvania U.S. Commerce Court Judge Robert W. Archbald (R) was involved in corrupt alliances with coal mine workers and railroad officials. He was convicted and removed from office. (1912)
- Cornelius Hanford (R) US District Judge for the Western District of Washington, resigned under threat of impeachment for corruption. (1912)

== Woodrow Wilson (D) administrations (1913–1921) ==
further information see Woodrow Wilson administration controversies

=== Judicial branch ===
- John Augustine Marshall (D) Judge of the US District Court of Utah, appointed by Grover Cleveland (D) was accused in a sex scandal involving the cleaning woman of his courtroom. He resigned. (1915)
- Daniel Thew Wright (R) Judge of the US District Court for the District of Columbia was appointed by Theodore Roosevelt (R) and was accused of favoritism and massive corruption. He resigned before impeachment. (1914)

== Warren G. Harding (R) administration (1921–1923) ==
=== Executive branch ===
- President Warren G. Harding's (R-OH) administration was marred by scandals stemming from men in his administration who followed him from Ohio, who came to be known as the Ohio Gang. They include;
1. Albert Fall, Secretary of the Interior, was bribed by Harry F. Sinclair for control of the Teapot Dome federal oil reserves in Wyoming. He was the first U.S. cabinet member to ever be convicted; he served two years in prison. (1922)Edwin C. Denby, Secretary of the Navy, resigned for his part in the Teapot Dome oil reserve scandal.
2. Attorney General Harry M. Daugherty resigned on March 28, 1924, because of an investigation about a bootlegging kickback scheme by his chief aide Jess Smith. Found not guilty. (1924)
3. Jess Smith, aide to Attorney General Daugherty, destroyed incriminating papers and then committed suicide.
4. Charles R. Forbes was appointed by Harding as the first director of the new Bureau of Veterans Affairs. After constructing and modernizing VA hospitals, he was convicted of bribery and corruption and sentenced to two years in jail.
5. Charles Cramer, Forbes's general counsel, committed suicide. (1923)
6. Thomas W. Miller, Head of the Office of Alien Property, was convicted of fraud by selling valuable German patents seized after World War I for far below market price as well as bribery. Served 18 months.

=== Legislative branch ===
- Thomas L. Blanton (D-TX) was censured for inserting obscene material into the congressional record. According to Franklin Wheeler Mondell (R-WY) the letter was said to contain language that was "unspeakable, vile, foul, filthy, profane, blasphemous and obscene". A motion to expel him failed by 8 votes. (1921)
- Truman Handy Newberry (R-MI) US Senator, was convicted of election irregularities, but the case was overturned by the US Supreme Court. However, due to continued opposition and a senate condemnation vote claiming that $3,750 was too much to spend on an election against automaker Henry Ford, he resigned. (1921)

=== Judicial branch ===
- Francis Asbury Winslow (R) Judge of the US District Court for the Southern District of New York. appointed by Warren G. Harding (R). Following calls for an investigation by Fiorello La Guardia into recent bankruptcy decisions and his choice of court-appointed receivers, Winslow was found to have committed "serious indiscretions". He then resigned. (1929)

== Calvin Coolidge (R) administrations (1923–1929) ==
=== Executive branch ===
- US Alien Property Custodian Thomas B. Miller (R) was convicted of conspiring to defraud the US government and served 18 months in prison. (1927)
- Frederick A. Fenning (R), District of Columbia Commissioner appointed by Calvin Coolidge, was investigated and accused of practices illegal and contrary to law. He resigned before trial. (1927)

=== Legislative branch ===
- John W. Langley (R-KY) resigned from the US Congress in January 1926, after losing an appeal to set aside his conviction of violating the Volstead Act (Prohibition). He had also been caught trying to bribe a Prohibition officer. He was sentenced to two years after which, his wife ran for Congress in his place and won two full terms.
- William Scott Vare (R-PA) US Senator, was unseated on December 6, 1929, due to charges of corruption and fraud during his election.
- Frank L. Smith (R), Head of the Illinois Commerce Commission, was appointed to be US Senator by IL Governor Len Small (R), but was rejected by the US Senate for alleged "fraud and corruption". (1927)

=== Judicial branch ===
- George English (D) U.S. District Judge for Illinois was impeached for taking an interest-free loan from a bank of which he was director as well as misbehavior and manipulation. Resigned before his Senate trial. (1924)

== Herbert Hoover (R) administration (1929–1933) ==
=== Legislative branch ===
- Senator Hiram Bingham (R-CT) was censured for hiring a lobbyist employed by a manufacturing organization to work on his staff. (1929)
- Harry E. Rowbottom (R-IN) was convicted in federal court of accepting bribes from persons who sought post office appointments. He was sentenced to one year in Leavenworth.
- George E. Foulkes (D-MI) US Rep, was found guilty of conspiracy and bribery and sentenced to 18 months in prison and fined $1,000 (1934)

=== Judicial branch ===
- John W. Brady (D) US Judge of the Third District Court of Appeals of Texas. Brady, who was married, was accused of stabbing his mistress multiple times when he discovered her escorted by another man. He was found guilty of murder without malice and sentenced to three years in prison. (1930)

== Franklin Delano Roosevelt (D) administrations (1933–1945) ==
=== Executive branch ===
- Michael J. Hogan (R) Collector of the Port of New York. Convicted of bribery in connection with an immigration ring for illegal aliens seeking entry into the United States. He was sentenced to a year and a day in a Federal Penitentiary. (1935)
- William P. MacCracken Jr. (R) US Assistant Secretary of Commerce for Aeronautics, was convicted of Contempt of Congress for the Air Mail scandal. (1934)

=== Legislative branch ===
- Francis Henry Shoemaker (Farmer-Labor-MN) was sentenced to a year and a day in the penitentiary for sending scurrilous and defamatory materials through the mail. (1933)
- John H. Hoeppel (D-CA) was convicted of trying to sell an appointment to the West Point Military Academy. (1936)
- Donald F. Snow (R-ME) was committed to the Maine State Prison for two to four years for embezzlement. (1935)

=== Judicial Branch ===
- Joseph Buffington (R) US Judge of the 3rd Circuit, appointed by Theodore Roosevelt (R). Investigation by the US House revealed that at the age of 92, Buffington was both deaf and blind and it was suspected that all of his decisions were being written and sold by another judge. He resigned before impeachment. (1935)
- Halsted L. Ritter (R) Judge of the US District Court for the Southern District of Florida appointed by Republican Calvin Coolidge. Was accused of taking kickbacks on bankruptcy cases and not reporting them on his taxes. Though he was found not guilty of six separate charges, he was found guilty on the seventh count charging 'general misbehavior' and bringing the judiciary into disrepute (accepting free meals and lodging during receivership proceedings). He was impeached and removed from office. (1936)
- Martin Thomas Manton (D) US District Court Judge for the Southern District of New York, was investigated for judicial corruption and bribery which resulted in prosecution and a two-year prison term. (1939)
- Edwin Stark Thomas (D) U.S. District Judge for Connecticut, during a grand jury investigation of official misconduct and his financial affairs, he resigned. (1939)
- John Warren Davis (D) Judge of the US Court of Appeals for the Third Circuit, appointed by Woodrow Wilson, was investigated for accepting a bribe from film mogul William Fox. Further investigation revealed Davis was routinely accepting bribes for decisions signed by fellow Judge Joseph Buffington (R) who was senile. When Fox was found guilty, Davis resigned two weeks later. (1939)
- Albert Williams Johnson (R) US Judge of the Middle District of Pennsylvania, appointed by Calvin Coolidge (R), was under investigation by a US House Judiciary Committee. In unusual language, they found he was a "wicked, evil and mendacious judge". The report of the subcommittee also said that almost "every litigant who had the misfortune to appear before this wicked and malicious judge became the immediate object of a crooked conspiracy whose sole interest was the amount of money that could be extorted from him for justice or the evasion of justice". Johnson resigned before impeachment (1945)

== Harry S. Truman (D) administrations (1945–1953) ==
=== Executive branch ===
- A Justice Department investigation of the Internal Revenue Service led to the firing or resignation of 166 lower level employees, causing President Harry Truman (D) to be stained with charges of corruption. (1950)
- William M. Boyle (D) Chairman of the Democratic National Committee, accused of getting special loan rates. Resigned for poor health. (1951)

=== Legislative branch ===
- Walter E. Brehm (R-OH) was convicted of accepting contributions illegally from one of his employees. He received a 15-month suspended sentence and a $5,000 fine. (1951)
- J. Parnell Thomas (R-NJ), a member of the House Committee on Un-American Activities (HUAC), was convicted of salary fraud in a kickback scheme and given an 18-month sentence and fined $10,000, resigning from Congress in 1950. He was imprisoned in Danbury Prison with two of the Hollywood Ten he had helped put there. He was pardoned by President Harry Truman (D) in 1952.
- Andrew J. May (D-KY) was convicted of accepting bribes in 1947 from a war munitions manufacturer. He was sentenced to nine months in prison, after which he was pardoned by Truman (D) in 1952.
- James Michael Curley (D-MA) was sentenced to 6–18 months on mail fraud and spent five months in prison before his sentence was commuted by President Truman. (1947)
- H. Styles Bridges (R-NH) US Senator, during the Lavender Scare of the 1950s, Bridges threatened to expose the son of US Senator Lester Hunt (D-WY) as a homosexual unless Hunt immediately resigned from the Senate, thus giving Republicans the majority. Hunt refused, but did not seek re-election and then shot himself. (1954)

== Dwight D. Eisenhower (R) administrations (1953–1961) ==
=== Executive branch ===
- Richard Nixon (R) Vice presidential candidate, delivered the "Checkers speech" to deflect scandal about $18,000 in gifts, maintaining the only personal gift he had received was a dog. (1952)
- Sherman Adams (R) Chief of Staff to Republican President Dwight D. Eisenhower was cited for Contempt of Congress and forced to resign because he refused to answer questions about an oriental rug and vicuna coat given to his wife. (1958)
- John C. Doerfer (R) appointed Chairman of the Federal Communications Commission by President Eisenhower, spent a week-long Florida vacation in 1960 on the luxury yacht owned by his friend George B. Storer, president of Storer Communications. During the 1950s quiz show scandals he was accused of conflict of interest and forced to resign.

=== Legislative branch ===
- Thomas J. Lane (D-MA) was convicted for evading taxes on his congressional income. He served four months in prison, but was re-elected three more times before his 1962 defeat due to re-districting. (1956)
- Ernest K. Bramblett (R-CA) received a suspended sentence and a $5,000 fine in 1955 for making false statements in connection with payroll padding and kickbacks from congressional employees.
- Douglas R. Stringfellow (R-UT) abandoned his 1954 re-election bid after admitting to embellishing his war record. Stringfellow falsely claimed to have been awarded a Silver Star and feigned paraplegia.

== John F. Kennedy (D) administration (1961–1963) ==
=== Legislative branch ===
- Thomas F. Johnson (D-MD) was indicted on charges of members of Maryland's S&L industry bribing him and lost his seat in 1962. Later was convicted of conspiracy and conflict of interest in 1968, served 3 1/2 months of a 6-month sentence and was fined $5,000.
- Frank W. Boykin (D-AL) was placed on six months' probation in 1963 following conviction in a case involving a conflict of interest and conspiracy to defraud the government. His prison sentence was suspended on age and health grounds and he was fined $40,000 total. He was pardoned by President Lyndon Johnson in 1965.

== Lyndon B. Johnson (D) administrations (1963–1969) ==
=== Executive branch ===
- Bobby Baker, (D) Secretary to the Majority Leader of the Senate Lyndon B. Johnson (the vice-president then serving), resigned after charges of corruption. He was convicted of tax evasion (1967)

=== Legislative branch ===
- Senator Daniel Brewster (D-MD) was convicted of accepting illegal gratuities and was handed a two to six-year prison term in 1973 However, in August 1974, his conviction was overturned on appeal. He was retried for a lesser charge and Brewster pled no contest to accepting an unlawful gratuity without corrupt intent and was fined $10,000 and was allowed to keep his law license.
- James Fred Hastings (R-NY) was a delegate to the 1968 Republican National Convention and the 1972 Republican National Convention. He was elected to Congress in 1968 and served from January 3, 1969, until he resigned on January 20, 1976, after being convicted of kickbacks and mail fraud. He served 14 months at Allenwood penitentiary (1976).
- Cornelius Gallagher (D-NJ) US Representative from District 13, was accused of evading payment of $74,000 in federal income taxes in 1966. He pled guilty in 1972 to tax evasion and perjury, sentenced to two years in prison and fined $10,000. (1966)

=== Judicial branch ===
see Lyndon B. Johnson judicial appointment controversies

- U.S. Supreme Court Justice Abe Fortas (D) resigned when he was discovered to be a paid consultant to a convicted criminal. No charges were ever filed. (1969)

== Richard Nixon (R) administrations (1969–1974) ==
=== Executive branch ===
- Vice President Spiro Agnew (R-MD) was convicted of tax fraud stemming from bribery charges in Maryland and forced to resign. Gerald R. Ford (R-MI) was nominated by Nixon to replace Agnew as vice president, becoming the first person appointed to the Vice Presidency under the terms of the 25th Amendment.
- Watergate concerns US President Richard Nixon (R-CA) who ordered the burglary of the offices of the Democratic National Committee at the Watergate complex in order to plant a Covert listening device in the DNC office to learn who inside his own administration was leaking information to the press. The burglars were discovered and arrested. Nixon tried to cover up the burglary, the bugging, and the full extent of other illegal acts by him and his close staff. The cover up resulted in 69 government officials being charged and 48 being convicted or pleading guilty. Eventually, President Nixon resigned his office rather than face trial and impeachment. Vice president Gerald Ford (R-MI) was sworn in as president and immediately pardoned Nixon. (1972–1974) Those also involved include:
1. John N. Mitchell (R) Attorney General of the United States, was convicted of perjury and served nineteen months of a one to four-year sentence.
2. Richard Kleindienst (R) Attorney General that replaced Mitchell, was convicted of "refusing to answer questions" given one month in jail.
3. Jeb Stuart Magruder (R) Head of Committee to Re-elect the President, pleaded guilty to one count of conspiracy, August 1973
4. Frederick C. LaRue (R) Advisor to John Mitchell, was convicted of obstruction of justice.
5. H. R. Haldeman (R) CoS for Nixon, was convicted of conspiracy, obstruction of justice, and perjury.
6. John Ehrlichman (R) Counsel to Nixon, was convicted of conspiracy, obstruction of justice, and perjury.
7. Egil Krogh (R) aide to John Ehrlichman, head of the 'plumbers', was sentenced to six years.
8. John W. Dean III (R) counsel to Nixon, was convicted for obstruction of justice.
9. Dwight L. Chapin (R) deputy assistant to Nixon, was convicted of perjury.
10. Herbert W. Kalmbach (R) personal attorney to Nixon, was convicted of illegal campaigning.
11. Charles W. Colson (R) special counsel to Nixon, was convicted for obstruction of justice.
12. Herbert L. Porter (R) aide to the Committee to Re-elect the President, was convicted of perjury.
13. G. Gordon Liddy (R) Special Investigations Group, was convicted of burglary.
- Maurice Stans (R) Secretary of Commerce, pleaded guilty to 3 counts of violating the reporting sections of the Federal Election Campaign Act and 2 counts of accepting illegal campaign contributions and was fined $5,000. (1975)
- G. Bradford Cook (R) was appointed by President Nixon to be Chairman of the U.S. Securities and Exchange Commission. He resigned his position during the investigation into the Robert Vesco/Watergate affair during which he allegedly lied to a grand jury and was disbarred by the US Supreme Court for three years. He had served as chairman for just 74 days. (1973) The Washington Star reported that Cook believed he was going to be impeached, and offered to resign. The White House allowed him to do so.
- H. R. Haldeman (R) Nixon's Chief of Staff, set up a secret fund-raising enterprise, the "Townhouse Operation", designed to bypass the Republican National Committee. (1970)
1. Harry Shuler Dent (R) Presidential Counsel and Strategist, pleaded guilty to violations of Federal election law for his part in the illegal fundraising operation.
2. Herbert W. Kalmbach (R) Nixon's Personal Attorney, raised $3.9 million for a secret Republican slush fund. He also promised an ambassador a better post in exchange for $100,000, which led to conviction and imprisonment. Kalmbach pleaded guilty to violation of the Federal Corrupt Practices Act and one count of promising federal employment.
3. Jack A. Gleason (R) White House Aide, pleaded guilty to violations of Federal election law concerning an illegal fund raising operation run by the White House.
4. Wendell Wyatt (R-OR) US Representative, was found guilty on one count of failing to report outlays from a secret cash fund that he controlled while heading the Richard Nixon campaign in Oregon. Fined $750. (1975)
- Richard Helms Director of the Central Intelligence Agency (1966–1973), was convicted of misleading Congress concerning assassination attempts in Cuba, anti-government activities in Chile and the illegal surveillance of journalists in the US. Mr. Helms pleaded no contest.
- Donald Segretti (R) ran a campaign of dirty tricks for Nixon which he dubbed "ratfucking", meaning forging and distributing false documents to embarrass Democrats. Segretti pled guilty to 3 counts of distributing illegal (forged) campaign literature and was sentenced to six months in prison. (1974)

=== Legislative branch ===
- Senator Ted Kennedy (D-MA) drove his car into a tidal channel on Chappaquiddick Island, a small island off of Martha's Vineyard, Massachusetts. He swam free of the flipped car but the trapped passenger, Mary Jo Kopechne, drowned. Kennedy pleaded guilty to leaving the scene of an accident and received a suspended sentence of two months. (1969)
- Cornelius Gallagher (D-NJ) pleaded guilty to tax evasion, and served two years in prison.
- J. Irving Whalley (R-PA) received suspended three-year sentence and fined $11,000 in 1973 for using mails to deposit staff salary kickbacks and threatening an employee to prevent her from giving information to the FBI.
- Martin B. McKneally (R-NY) was placed on one year's probation and fined $5,000 in 1971 for failing to file income tax return. He had not paid taxes for many years prior.
- Richard T. Hanna (D-CA) was convicted in an influence-buying scandal. (1974)
- Edwin Reinecke (R-CA) was convicted of perjury and sentenced to 18 months in prison as part of the Watergate investigation. He resigned one day before his sentencing, which was overturned on appeal because "the Senate Judiciary Committee before which he was accused of perjuring himself had failed to publish its rule permitting a one-man quorum."
- William Oswald Mills (R-MD) US Representative had received an undisclosed $25,000 gift from the Finance Committee of President Richard Nixon's re-election campaign (CREEP), which was part of $900,000 in unaccounted donations made by that committee in May 1973. Five days later, he committed suicide. (1973)
- George V. Hansen (R-ID) US Representative, was the first member of Congress to be convicted of violating a new 1971 campaign law requiring disclosure of financial contributions. (1974)
- James R. Jones (D-OK) US Representative, pleaded guilty to a federal misdemeanor charge that he had failed to report a $200 campaign contribution. He was fined $200. (1972)
- John Dowdy (D-TX) US Representative, found guilty of perjury, sentenced to 6 months and fined. (1972)

=== Judicial branch ===
- Herbert Allan Fogel (R) US Judge of Eastern District of PA (1973–1978) resigned after investigations of his role in awarding a lucrative government contract to his uncle. During the investigation, he invoked the 5th Amendment multiple times. He was then asked to resign. (1978)

== Gerald Ford (R) administration (1974–1977) ==
=== Executive branch ===
- Earl Butz (R) Secretary of Agriculture, was asked privately why the party of Lincoln was not able to attract more blacks. Butz replied: "I'll tell you what the coloreds want. It's three things: first, a tight pussy; second, loose shoes; and third, a warm place to shit." Butz resigned soon afterwards on October 4, 1976.
- Pardon of Richard Nixon: September 8, 1974, President Ford granted a full and unconditional pardon to former President Richard Nixon, his predecessor, for any crimes that he might have committed against the United States as president. In particular, the pardon covered Nixon's actions during the Watergate scandal in which the president was accused of multiple criminal charges, forcing him to resign from office rather than face a trial to prove his innocence.

=== Legislative branch ===
- Andrew J. Hinshaw (R-CA) US Representative, was convicted of accepting bribes while Assessor of Orange County as well as stealing county funds and property for his Congressional Campaign. He served one year in prison. (1977)
- Wayne L. Hays (D-OH) resigned from Congress after hiring and promoting his mistress, Elizabeth Ray. (1976)
- Frank Horton (R-NY) pleaded guilty to a DWI (arrested at 105 mph with two women; neither were his wife) and was sentenced to 11 days in jail. (1976)
- James F. Hastings (R-NY) was convicted of taking kickbacks from his staff and mail fraud. He took the money from his employees and used it to buy cars, boats, school tuition and retirement. Served 14 months at Allenwood penitentiary. (1976)
- Richard Alvin Tonry (D-LA) US Representative from the 1st District, pled guilty to illegal contributions and ballot box stuffing. He served four months in Congress and six months in jail. (1976)
- James R. Jones (D-OK) US Rep, pleaded guilty to a federal misdemeanor charge that he had failed to report a 1972 campaign contribution from Gulf Oil. (1976)
- John V. Dowdy (D-TX) served 6 months in prison for perjury. (1973)
- Bertram L. Podell (D-NY) pleaded guilty to conspiracy and conflict of interest. He was fined $5,000 and served four months in prison. (1974)
- Frank Brasco (D-NY) was sentenced to three months in jail and fined $10,000 for conspiracy to accept bribes from a reputed Mafia figure who sought truck leasing contracts from the Post Office and loans to buy trucks.
- Frank Clark (D-PA) paid congressional salaries to 13 Pennsylvania residents who performed no official duties.
- Wilbur Mills (D-AR) stepped down as Chairman of the House Ways and Means Committee after his affair with Argentinian stripper Fanne Fox was made public in 1974.

=== Judicial branch ===
- Otto Kerner Jr. (D), US Judge of the 7th Circuit Court and former Illinois Governor, was indicted on charges of conspiracy, bribery, mail fraud, and income tax evasion related to accepting stock shares from a racing company and lying about it. He was convicted and resigned his position. (1974)

== Jimmy Carter administration (D) (1977–1981) ==
=== Executive branch ===
- Debategate – An election briefing book for President Jimmy Carter was stolen and given to opponent Ronald Reagan before the presidential election of 1980. see 1980 October Surprise theory see Iran hostage crisis

=== Legislative branch ===
- Daniel J. Flood (D-PA) was censured for bribery during the 96th United States Congress. The allegations led to his resignation on January 31, 1980.
- J. Herbert Burke (R-FL) US Representative, pleaded guilty to disorderly intoxication and resisting arrest, and nolo contendere to an additional charge of witness tampering. He was sentenced to three months plus fines. (1978)
- Robert E. Bauman (R-MD) US Representative, was charged with soliciting sex from a teenage boy in gay bar. After counseling, the charges were dropped, but he lost his next two elections. (1980)
- Fred Richmond (D-NY) received charges of soliciting sex from a 16-year-old boy which were dropped after he submitted to counseling. (1978)
- Charles Diggs (D-MI) was convicted on 29 charges of mail fraud and filing false payroll forms which formed a kickback scheme with his staff. Sentenced to 3 years. (1978)
- Herman Talmadge (D-GA) US Senator, was denounced by the Senate for "improper financial conduct" on October 11, 1979. He failed to be re-elected.
- Michael Myers (D-PA) received suspended six-month jail term after pleading no contest to disorderly conduct charged stemming from an incident at a Virginia bar in which he allegedly attacked a hotel security guard and a cashier.
- Charles H. Wilson (D-CA) was censured after he converted $25,000 in campaign funds to his own use and accepted $10,500 from a man with a direct interest in legislation before Congress. (1980)
- John Connally (R-TX) was accused of accepting a $10,000 bribe (Milk Money scandal). He was acquitted. (1975)
- Richard Tonry (D-LA) pleaded guilty to receiving illegal campaign contributions.
- Koreagate scandal involving alleged bribery of more than 30 members of Congress by the South Korean government represented by Tongsun Park. Several other Koreans and Congressmen were allegedly involved, but not charged or reprimanded. The most notable are:
1. Richard T. Hanna (D-CA) pleaded guilty and sentenced to 6–30 months in federal prison. Wound up serving a year in prison.
2. John J. McFall, Edward Roybal, and Charles H. Wilson, all (D-CA), were involved. Roybal was censured, while McFall and Wilson were reprimanded.

=== Judicial branch ===
- Herbert Allan Fogel (R) Federal Judge of the Eastern Federal District of Pennsylvania (1973–1978), and nominated by Richard M. Nixon, resigned after investigation of a government contract in which he was forced to invoke the 5th Amendment. (1978)
- Jack T. Camp (R) Federal Judge, Northern District of GA, appointed by Ronald Reagan, guilty of trying to purchase cocaine, firearms violations, aiding a felon. Resigned. Sentenced to 30 days. (2010)

== Ronald Reagan (R) administrations (1981–1989) ==
=== Executive branch ===
- Operation Ill Wind was a three-year investigation launched in 1986 by the FBI into corruption by U.S. government and military officials, as well as private defense contractors.
1. Melvyn Paisley, appointed Assistant Secretary of the Navy in 1981 by Republican President Ronald Reagan, was found to have accepted hundreds of thousands of dollars in bribes. He pleaded guilty to bribery, resigned his office and served four years in prison.
2. James E. Gaines Deputy Assistant Secretary of the Navy, took over when Paisley resigned his office. He was convicted of accepting an illegal gratuity, and theft and conversion of government property. He was sentenced to six months in prison.
3. Victor D. Cohen, Deputy Assistant Secretary of the Air Force, was the 50th conviction obtained under the Ill Wind probe when he pleaded guilty to accepting bribes and conspiring to defraud the government.
- The Housing and Urban Development scandal concerned bribery by selected contractors for low income housing projects.
1. Samuel Pierce, Secretary of Housing and Urban Development, was not charged because he made "full and public written acceptance of responsibility".
2. James G. Watt, the Secretary of Interior from 1981 to 1983, was charged with 25 counts of perjury and obstruction of justice, sentenced to five years' probation, fined $5,000 and 500 hours of community service.
3. Deborah Gore Dean (R), Executive Assistant to Samuel Pierce (Secretary of HUD from 1981 to 1987, and not charged), was convicted of 12 counts of perjury, conspiracy, bribery. Sentenced to 21 months in prison. (1987)
4. Phillip D. Winn, Assistant Secretary of HUD from 1981 to 1982, pleaded guilty to bribery in 1994.
5. Thomas Demery, Assistant Secretary of HUD, pleaded guilty to bribery and obstruction.
6. Joseph A. Strauss, Special Assistant to the Secretary of HUD, was convicted of accepting payments to favor Puerto Rican land developers in receiving HUD funding.
7. Silvio D. DeBartolomeis was convicted of perjury and bribery.
- Wedtech scandal – Wedtech Corporation was convicted of bribery for Defense Department contracts.
1. Edwin Meese (R) Attorney General resigned, but was never convicted.
2. Lyn Nofziger (R) White House Press Secretary had a conviction of lobbying that was overturned.
3. Mario Biaggi (D-NY) was sentenced to 2 1/2 years in prison.
- Savings and loan scandal – 747 institutions failed and had to be rescued with $160,000,000,000 of the taxpayer's money in connection with the Keating Five. see Legislative scandals.
- John M. Fedders (R) SEC Dir of Enforcement, in divorce testimony he admitted beating his wife and then resigned. (1985)
- Emanuel S. Savas, appointed by Ronald Reagan to be Assistant Secretary of Housing and Urban Development, resigned on July 8, 1983, after an internal Justice Department investigation found he had abused his office by having his Government staff work on his private book on Government time.
- Iran-Contra Affair (1985–1986) – In violation of an arms embargo, administration officials arranged to sell armaments to Iran in an attempt to improve relations with Iran and obtain their influence in the release of hostages held in Lebanon. Oliver North of the National Security Council then diverted proceeds from the arms sale to fund Contra rebels attempting to overthrow the left-wing government of Nicaragua, which was in direct violation of Congress' Boland Amendment. Ronald Reagan appeared on TV stating there was no "arms for hostages" deal, but was later forced to admit, also on TV, that yes, there indeed had been:
1. Caspar Weinberger (R) Secretary of Defense, was indicted on two counts of perjury and one count of obstruction of justice on June 16, 1992. Weinberger received a pardon from George H. W. Bush on December 24, 1992, before he was tried.
2. William Casey (R) Director of the CIA is thought to have conceived the plan, but was stricken ill hours before he would testify. Reporter Bob Woodward records that Casey knew of and approved the plan.
3. Robert C. McFarlane National Security Adviser was convicted of withholding evidence, but after a plea bargain was given only two years' probation. Later pardoned by President George H. W. Bush
4. Elliott Abrams (R) Assistant Secretary of State, was convicted of withholding evidence, but after a plea bargain was given only two years' probation. He was later pardoned by President George H. W. Bush
5. Alan D. Fiers Chief of the CIA's Central American Task Force, was convicted of withholding evidence and sentenced to one year's probation. Later pardoned by President George H. W. Bush
6. Clair George Chief of Covert Ops-CIA was convicted on two charges of perjury, but was pardoned by President George H. W. Bush before sentencing.
7. Oliver North (R) Deputy Director of the National Security Council, was convicted of accepting an illegal gratuity, obstruction of a congressional inquiry, and destruction of documents, but the convictions were vacated, after the appeals court found that witnesses in his trial might have been impermissibly affected by his immunized congressional testimony.
8. Fawn Hall, Oliver North's secretary, was given immunity from prosecution on charges of conspiracy and destroying documents in exchange for her testimony.
9. John Poindexter (R) National Security Advisor, was convicted of five counts of conspiracy, obstruction of justice, perjury, defrauding the government, and the alteration and destruction of evidence. The Supreme Court overturned this ruling.
10. Duane Clarridge Ex-CIA senior official, was indicted in November 1991 on seven counts of perjury and false statements relating to a November 1985 shipment to Iran. He was pardoned before trial by President George H. W. Bush.
11. Richard V. Secord an ex-major general in the Air Force, who organized the Iran arms sales and Contra aid, pleaded guilty in November 1989 to making false statements to Congress. He was sentenced to two years of probation.
12. Albert Hakim, Businessman, pleaded guilty in November 1989 to supplementing the salary of Oliver North by buying him a $13,800 fence. Hakim was given two years of probation and a $5,000 fine, while his company, Lake Resources Inc. was ordered to dissolve.
13. Thomas G. Clines, a former intelligence official who became an arms dealer, was convicted in September 1990 on four income tax counts, including under-reporting of income to the IRS and lying about not having foreign accounts. He was sentenced to 16 months of prison and fined $40,000.
14. Carl R. Channell (R) a fund-raiser for conservative causes, pleaded guilty in April 1987 to defrauding the IRS via a tax-exempt organization to fund the Contras. He was sentenced to two years' probation.
15. Richard R. Miller associate to Carl R. Channell, pleaded guilty in May 1987 to defrauding the IRS via a tax-exempt organization led by Channell. More precisely, he pleaded guilty to lying to the IRS about the deductibility of donations to the organization. Some of the donations were used to fund the Contras. Sentenced to two years of probation and 120 hours of community service.
16. Joseph F. Fernandez CIA Station Chief of Costa Rica, was indicted on five counts in 1988. The case was dismissed when Attorney General Dick Thornburgh refused to declassify information needed for his defense in 1990.
- Michael Deaver (R) Deputy Chief of Staff to Ronald Reagan from 1981 to 1985, pleaded guilty to perjury related to lobbying activities and was sentenced to three years' probation and fined $100,000.
- Sewergate was a scandal in which funds from the EPA were selectively used for projects which would aid politicians friendly to the Reagan administration.
1. Anne Gorsuch Burford, Head of the EPA, cut the EPA staff by 22% and refused to turn over documents to Congress about withholding funds, citing presidential "executive privilege", whereupon she was found in Contempt and resigned with twenty of her top employees. (1980)
2. Rita Lavelle, a U.S. Environmental Protection Agency Administrator, misused "superfund" monies and was convicted of perjury. She served six months in prison, was fined $10,000 and given five years' probation.
- Louis O. Giuffrida (R), director of the Federal Emergency Management Agency, was appointed in April 1981 by Ronald Reagan and resigned his position on September 1, 1985. His announcement came a day before a Congressional subcommittee was to approve a report detailing waste, fraud, and abuse at his agency.
- Fred J. Villella, deputy director at Federal Emergency Management Agency, had more than $70,000 in renovations made to part of a dormitory at an agency training center in Maryland for use as a residence, including an $11,000 stove, wet bar, microwave oven, fireplace and cherrywood cabinets. Villella accepted free tickets to the same Republican fund-raisers as Giuffrida and also was accused of sexually harassing a FEMA security guard he also used for private errands. He resigned in 1984. (1984)
- J. Lynn Helms was appointed head of the Federal Aviation Administration by Ronald Reagan in April 1981. He was charged by the Securities and Exchange Commission with diverting $1.2 million from an issue of tax-exempt municipal bonds to his own personal use. Mr. Helms signed an order that settled the case before trial, though he resigned his FAA post.
- Veterans administration Chief Bob Nimmo was appointed by President Ronald Reagan in 1981. He resigned one year later just before a General Accounting Office report criticized him for improper such use of government funds. (1982)
- John Fedders was appointed chief of enforcement for the Securities and Exchange Commission by President Ronald Reagan. He was asked to resign his position after divorce proceedings, during which he admitted beating his wife.
- Peter Voss (R) was appointed to the US Postal Service Board of Governors in 1982 by President Ronald Reagan. He was sentenced to four years in federal prison and fined $11,000 for theft and accepting payoffs. He resigned his office in 1986, when he pleaded guilty.
- Carlos Campbell (R), Asst Sec of Commerce to the EDA, was accused of favoritism in awarding grants and being over zealous. Before an investigation could start he resigned. (1983)
- Jim Petro (R), U.S. Attorney appointed by President Ronald Reagan, was dismissed and fined for tipping off an acquaintance about an ongoing Secret Service investigation. (1984)
- William H. Kennedy, United States Attorney in San Diego, was dismissed by President Reagan after he mentioned that the CIA was involved in a smuggling case. (1982)
- Marjory Mecklenburg (R) Deputy Assistant Secretary of the Department of Health and Human Resources used travel funds to see her son's Denver Bronco games. She resigned. (1985)
- Guy W. Fiske (R) Deputy Secretary of Commerce, after allegations of a conflict of interest in contract negotiations with satellite communications company Comsat, resigned. (1983)

=== Legislative branch ===
- Mark Hatfield (R-OR) US Senator and US Appropriations Chairman, revealed that his wife had been paid $55,000 by Greek arms dealer Basil Tsakos, who had been lobbying for a trans-African pipeline. (1984)
- David Durenberger (R-MN) Senator was denounced by the Senate for unethical financial transactions (1990) and then disbarred as an attorney. In 1995, he pled guilty to 5 misdemeanor counts of misuse of public funds and was given one year's probation.
- Barney Frank (D-MA) US Representative, lived with convicted felon Steve Gobie, who ran a gay prostitution operation from Frank's apartment without his knowledge. Frank was admonished by Congress for using his congressional privilege to eliminate 33 parking tickets attributed to Gobie. (1987)
- Donald E. "Buz" Lukens (R-OH) was convicted of two counts of bribery and conspiracy. (1996)
- Anthony Lee Coelho (D-CA) resigned rather than face inquiries from both the Justice Department and the House Ethics Committee about an allegedly unethical "junk bond" deal, which netted him $6,000. He was never charged with any crime. (1989)
- Jim Wright (D-TX) US Representative and house Speaker, resigned after an ethics investigation led by Newt Gingrich alleged improper receipt of $145,000 in gifts (1989)
- Keating Five (1980–1989) The failure of Lincoln Savings and Loan led to Charles Keating donating to the campaigns of five Senators for help. Keating served 42 months in prison. The five were investigated by the Senate Ethics Committee which found that:
1. Senator Alan Cranston (D-CA) was reprimanded.
2. Senator Dennis DeConcini (D-AZ) acted improperly.
3. Senator Don Riegle (D-MI) acted improperly.
4. Senator John Glenn (D-OH) used poor judgment.
5. Senator John McCain (R-AZ) used poor judgment.
- Abscam was an FBI sting involving fake "Arabs" trying to bribe 31 congressmen. (1980) The following six Congressmen were convicted:
1. Senator Harrison A. Williams (D-NJ) was convicted on nine counts of bribery and conspiracy, and was sentenced to three years in prison.
2. Representative John Jenrette (D-SC) was sentenced to two years in prison for bribery and conspiracy.
3. Richard Kelly (R-FL) accepted $25K and then claimed he was conducting his own investigation into corruption. Served 13 months.
4. Raymond Lederer (D-PA) said that "I can give you me" after accepting $50,000. He was sentenced to three years in prison.
5. Michael Myers (D-PA) accepted $50,000, saying "... money talks and bullshit walks." He was sentenced to three years in prison and was expelled from the House.
6. Frank Thompson (D-NJ) was sentenced to three years in prison.
7. John M. Murphy (D-NY) served 20 months of a three-year sentence.
8. Also arrested were NJ State Senator Angelo Errichetti (D) and members of the Philadelphia City Council.
- Mario Biaggi (D-NY) was part of the Wedtech scandal and was convicted of obstruction of justice accepting illegal gratuities. He was sentenced to eight years in prison and fined $500,000. (1988)
- Ernie Konnyu (R-CA) US Representative from the 12th District, was accused of sexual harassment by several female employees and retaliating against those who complained. He was ousted by fellow republicans and lost the next primary. (1987)
- Pat Swindall (R-GA) was convicted of six counts of perjury. (1989)
- George V. Hansen (R-ID) was censured for failing to file out disclosure forms. He spent fifteen months in prison.
- Frederick W. Richmond (D-NY) was convicted of tax evasion and possession of marijuana. He served nine months in prison. (1982)
- Joshua Eilberg (D-PA) pleaded guilty to conflict-of-interest charges. In addition, he convinced President Jimmy Carter (D) to fire the U.S. Attorney investigating his case.
- Robert E. Bauman (R-MD) was charged with soliciting sex from a teenage boy. Counseling was ordered, but he lost his next two elections. (1980)

=== Judicial branch ===
- Alcee Hastings (D-FL) Federal District Court Judge was impeached by the House and convicted by the Senate of soliciting a bribe. (1989)
- Harry Claiborne (D-NV) Federal District Court Judge was impeached by the House and convicted by the Senate on two counts of tax evasion. He served over one year in prison.
- J. William Petro (R) U.S. Attorney in Ohio, was found guilty of criminal contempt of court for leaking confidential information. He was removed from office. (1985)
- Walter Nixon (D) US Judge for the Southern District of Mississippi, was accused of asking a local DA to stop prosecuting the son of a donor to Richard Nixon. He was found guilty of perjury and sentenced to five years in prison. Still a US Judge while imprisoned, he was impeached by the House and convicted by the Senate of perjury and removed from office. (1983)
- Robert Frederick Collins (D) US District Judge for the Eastern District of Louisiana appointed by Jimmy Carter. Collins was accused of accepting bribes from a marijuana smuggler in exchange for a lighter sentence. He was found guilty of bribery, conspiracy and obstruction of justice and sentenced to five years in prison. (1991)

== George H. W. Bush (R) administration (1989–1993) ==
=== Executive branch ===
- President George H. W. Bush (R) denied any knowledge of the Iran–Contra affair during his election campaign by saying he was "out of the loop". His own diaries of that time, though, stated "I'm one of the few people that know fully the details ..." He repeatedly refused to disclose this to investigators during the investigation and thus won the election. (1988)
- Catalina Vasquez Villalpando (R), Treasurer of the United States, pleaded guilty to obstruction of justice and tax evasion, making her the only US Treasurer ever sent to prison. (1992) She was sentenced to 4 months and fined. (1994)
- Iran-Contra Affair pardons – On December 24, 1992, George H. W. Bush (R) granted clemency to four convicted government officials as well as Caspar Weinberger and Duane Clarridge, whose trials had not yet begun. This action prevented any further investigation into the matter.
1. Caspar Weinberger, Secretary of Defense under Ronald Reagan, pardoned before trial
2. Robert C. McFarlane, National Security Advisor to Ronald Reagan, guilty of withholding information,
3. Elliott Abrams, Assistant Secretary of State to Ronald Reagan, guilty of withholding information,
4. Clair George, CIA Chief of Covert Ops, guilty of perjury
5. Alan D. Fiers, Chief of the CIA's Central American Task Force, guilty of withholding information
6. Duane Clarridge, CIA Operations Officer, pardoned before trial

=== Legislative branch ===
- Charles "Chig" Cagle (R) District Chairman for US Representative Charles H. Taylor (R-NC) was found guilty of conspiracy to commit bank fraud and one count of conspiracy to commit money laundering concerning Taylor's Blue Ridge Saving Bank. Martin was sentenced to two years' probation. (1993)
- Albert Bustamante (D-TX) was convicted of accepting bribes. (1993)
- Lawrence J. Smith (D-FL) pleaded guilty to tax fraud and lying to federal election officials and served three months in jail, fined $5,000, 2 years' probation and back taxes of $40,000. (1993)
- Senator David Durenberger (R-MN) was denounced by the Senate for unethical financial transactions and then disbarred in 1990. He pleaded guilty to misuse of public funds and was given one year's probation and fined. (1995)
- Donald E. "Buz" Lukens (R-OH) was convicted of contributing to the delinquency of a minor for having sex with a 16-year-old girl. He was sentenced to 30 days in jail and fined $500. (1989)

=== Judicial branch ===
- Clarence Thomas (R), Supreme Court nominee, was accused of sexual harassment by eight former employees including Anita Hill, but was approved anyway.
- Walter Nixon, United States District Judge for the Southern District of Mississippi was impeached by the House and convicted by the Senate for perjury on November 3, 1989.
- Robert Frederick Collins (D) Judge of the US District Court for the Eastern District of Louisiana appointed by Jimmy Carter. He was charged with obstruction and accepting bribe money from a drug dealer in exchange for a lighter sentence. $17,500 in marked bills were found in his chambers. He was found guilty and sentenced to five years in prison and disbarred. (1991)

== Bill Clinton (D) administrations (1993–2001) ==
=== Executive branch ===
- President Bill Clinton (D) was accused by the House of Representatives and impeached for perjury and obstruction of justice for lying under oath about consensual sexual relations with a member of his staff, Monica Lewinsky. Clinton was acquitted by the Senate and remained in office for the rest of his term. Clinton subsequently was cited for contempt of court by the Arkansas Law Association and agreed to a five-year suspension from practicing law in Arkansas. (1998)
- Ronald Blackley (D) Chief of Staff to the Secretary of Agriculture Mike Espy, was sentenced to 27 months for perjury in a case involving improper gifts that also included Espy. Secretary Espy was found not guilty.
- David Watkins (D) Director of the Office of Administration used the White House helicopter, Marine One, to fly to a nearby golf course for an afternoon game. Ostensibly to check out security issues, Watkins later admitted it was just to play golf and resigned. (1994)
- Darleen A. Druyun (D), Principal Deputy United States Under Secretary of the Air Force. She pleaded guilty to a felony of inflating the price of contracts to favor her future employer, Boeing. In October 2004, she was sentenced to nine months in jail for corruption, fined $5,000, given three years of supervised release and 150 hours of community service. (2005).

=== Legislative branch ===
- Newt Gingrich (R-GA), the Speaker of the US House of Representatives, was charged $300,000 in sanctions by the majority Republican House ethics committee for an unethical book deal leading to his eventual resignation from office. (1997)
- Wes Cooley (R-OR) was convicted of having lied on the 1994 voter information pamphlet about his service in the Army. He was fined and sentenced to two years' probation. (1994)
- Dan Burton (R-IN) US Representative and a combative critic of the Clinton/Lewinsky affair, admitted that he had fathered a child out of wedlock. (1998)
- Austin Murphy (D-PA) was convicted of engaging in voter fraud for filling out absentee ballots for members of a nursing home.
- Nicholas Mavroules (D-MA) pleaded guilty to bribery charges.
- Bob Packwood (R-OR) was accused of sexual misconduct by nineteen women. He fought the allegations, but eventually, the US Senate Ethics Committee found him guilty of a "pattern of abuse of his position of power and authority" and recommended that he be expelled from the Senate. He resigned on September 7, 1995.
- House banking scandal – The House of Representatives Bank found that 450 members had overdrawn their checking accounts, but had not been penalized. Six were convicted of charges, most only tangentially related to the House Bank itself. Twenty two more of the most prolific over-drafters were singled out by the House Ethics Committee. (1992)
1. Buz Lukens (R-OH) was convicted of bribery and conspiracy.
2. Carl C. Perkins (D-KY) pleaded guilty to a check-kiting scheme involving several financial institutions (including the House Bank).
3. Carroll Hubbard (D-KY) was convicted of illegally funneling money to his wife's 1992 campaign to succeed him in congress.
4. Mary Rose Oakar (D-OH) was charged with seven felonies, but pleaded guilty only to a misdemeanor campaign finance charge not related to the House Bank.
5. Walter Fauntroy (D-DC) was convicted of filing false disclosure forms in order to hide unauthorized income.
6. Jack Russ, House Sergeant-at-Arms, was convicted of three counts.
- The Congressional Post Office scandal (1991–1995) was a conspiracy to embezzle House Post Office money through stamps and postal vouchers to congressmen.
1. Dan Rostenkowski (D-IL) was convicted and sentenced to 18 months in prison in 1995.
2. Joe Kolter (D-PA) was convicted of one count of conspiracy and sentenced to 6 months in prison.
3. Postmaster Robert V. Rota was convicted of one count of conspiracy and two counts of embezzlement.
- Jay C. Kim (R-CA) plea guilty in 1997 to accepting $230,000 in illegal foreign and corporate campaign donations, including one-third of all donations to his initial 1992 campaign for Congress after a long term running FBI Investigation in Los Angeles, CA. At the time, it was a record for campaign violations. Kim was sentenced to House arrest and fined $20,000, and subsequently lost re-election in the 1998 Republican Primary Election for the 41st Congressional District in California. (1997)
- Charles Warren (R) Chief of Staff to Chris Cannon (R-UT) US Representative, resigned after acknowledging an improper sexual relationship with a subordinate who alleged he coerced her into an unwanted affair of "consensual contact without sex". (1997)
- Dana Rohrabacher (R-CA) US Representative, was found guilty of failure to properly report campaign contributions and fined. (1996)
1. Rhonda Carmony (R) Campaign Manager and wife of State Representative Dana Rohrabacher (R) was the key instigator of a Republican effort to manipulate the 67th California State District election by fostering the candidacy of decoy candidate Laurie Campbell (D) to undermine the candidacy of popular Democrat Linda Moulton-Patterson. Carmony pled guilty and was sentenced to three years of probation and 300 hours of community service and was fined. (1996)
2. Jack Wenpo Wu (R) Campaign Treasurer for Dana Rohrabacher (R-CA) US Representative, embezzled over $300K. He was repaying the money when he was found guilty and sentenced to 1 year and 5 years' probation (2015)
3. Enid Greene Mickelsen (Waldholtz) (R) U.S. Representative, was found guilty on four counts of violating FEC rules and paid $100,000 in fines for campaign violations. (1994)
4. Joe Waldholtz (R) Campaign Manager and husband of Enid Greene Waldholtz (R) pled guilty to federal charges of tax, bank, and campaign fraud, embezzling and forgery(1995) and then, while out on parole, was subsequently convicted of forging insurance and Veterans Affairs checks from his stepmother and his late father.
- Hayes Martin (R) Campaign Treasurer to US Representative Charles H. Taylor (R-NC) was found guilty of one count of conspiracy to commit bank fraud and one count of conspiracy to commit money laundering concerning Taylor's Blue Ridge Saving Bank. Martin was found guilty and sentenced to two years' probation. (1993)
- Charles "Chig" Cagle (R) District Republican Party Chairman for US Representative Charles H. Taylor (R-NC) was found guilty of one count of conspiracy to commit bank fraud and one count of conspiracy to commit money laundering concerning Taylor's Blue Ridge Saving Bank. Cagle was found guilty and sentenced to two years' probation. (1993)
- Bob Livingston (R-LA) US Representative from the 1st District, was calling for the impeachment of Bill Clinton when pornographer Larry Flynt accused Livingston of multiple counts of adultery. He acknowledged he had "strayed from my marriage" and resigned. (1999)
- Mel Reynolds (D-IL) US Representative from the Illinois 2nd District, was accused of sexual misconduct and obstruction of justice including sex with a minor and was found guilty. He resigned his seat and was sentenced to five years. (1994)

== George W. Bush (R) administrations (2001–2009) ==
=== Executive branch ===
- Joseph E. Schmitz (R) was nominated by President George W. Bush (R) to be Defense Department Inspector General on June 18, 2001. He resigned on September 9, 2005, in the wake of several allegations by Senator Charles Grassley (R-Iowa), including that he had obstructed the FBI investigation of John A. Shaw.
- Walter Reed Army Medical Center neglect scandal (2007) about substandard conditions for wounded soldiers at Walter Reed Army Medical Center including long delays in treatment, rodent infestation and outbreaks of mold resulted in the relief of three senior staff;
1. Francis J. Harvey (R) Secretary of the Army, appointed by G. W. Bush, resigned
2. Maj. Gen. George W. Weightman ( ) was fired for failures linked to the scandal
3. Lt. Gen. Kevin C. Kiley (R) appointed by G. W. Bush, was relieved of command resigned for failures linked to the scandal.
- Timothy Goeglein, Special Assistant to President Bush, resigned in 2008 when it was discovered that more than twenty of his columns had been plagiarized from an Indiana newspaper.
- Scott Bloch was appointed by President George W. Bush to head the United States Office of Special Counsel. On April 27, 2010, Bloch pleaded guilty to criminal contempt of Congress for "willfully and unlawfully withholding pertinent information from a House committee investigating his decision to have several government computers wiped...." On February 2, Magistrate Judge Deborah A. Robinson ruled that Bloch faces a mandatory sentence of at least one month in prison.
- Lewis "Scooter" Libby, Chief of Staff to Vice President Dick Cheney (R), was convicted of perjury and obstruction of justice in the Plame affair on March 6, 2007. He was sentenced to 30 months in prison and fined $250,000. The sentence was commuted by George W. Bush on July 1, 2007. The felony remains on Libby's record, though the jail time and fine were commuted. President Donald Trump fully pardoned Libby on April 13, 2018.
- Alphonso Jackson, the Secretary of Housing and Urban Development, resigned while under investigation by the Justice Department for alleged cronyism and favoritism
- Karl Rove, Senior Adviser to President George W. Bush, was investigated by the Office of Special Counsel for "improper political influence over government decision-making", as well as for his involvement in several other scandals such as Lawyergate, Bush White House email controversy and Plame affair. He resigned in April 2007. (See Karl Rove in the George W. Bush administration)
- Richard J. Griffin, the Assistant Secretary of State for Diplomatic Security appointed by George W. Bush who made key decisions regarding the department's oversight of private security contractor Blackwater USA, resigned in November 2007, after a critical review by the House Oversight Committee found that his office had failed to adequately supervise private contractors during the Blackwater Baghdad shootings protecting U.S. diplomats in Iraq.
- Republican contributor Howard Krongard was appointed Inspector General of the US State Department by President George W. Bush in 2005. was accused by the House Oversight Committee of improperly interfering with investigations into private security contractor Blackwater USA concerning the Blackwater Baghdad shootings. Krongard resigned in December 2007.
- "Lawyergate" or the Dismissal of U.S. attorneys controversy refers to President Bush firing, without explanation, eleven Republican federal prosecutors whom he himself had appointed. It is alleged that they were fired for prosecuting Republicans and not prosecuting Democrats. When Congressional hearings were called, a number of senior Justice Department officials cited executive privilege and refused to testify under oath and instead resigned, including:
1. Attorney General Alberto Gonzales
2. Karl Rove, Advisor to President Bush
3. Harriet Miers, Legal Counsel to President Bush, was found in Contempt of Congress
4. Michael A. Battle, Director of Executive Office of US Attorneys in the Justice Department
5. Bradley Schlozman, Director of Executive Office of US Attorneys who replaced Battle
6. Michael Elston, Chief of Staff to Deputy Attorney General Paul McNulty
7. Paul McNulty, Deputy Attorney General to William Mercer
8. William W. Mercer, Associate Attorney General to Alberto Gonzales
9. Kyle Sampson, Chief of Staff to Attorney General Alberto Gonzales
10. Monica Goodling, Liaison between President Bush and the Justice Department
11. Joshua Bolten, Deputy Chief of Staff to President Bush was found in Contempt of Congress
12. Sara M. Taylor, Aide to Presidential Advisor Karl Rove
- Bush White House email controversy – During the Lawyergate investigation it was discovered that the Bush administration used Republican National Committee (RNC) web servers for millions of emails which were then destroyed, lost or deleted in possible violation of the Presidential Records Act and the Hatch Act. George W. Bush, Dick Cheney, Karl Rove, Andrew Card, Sara Taylor and Scott Jennings all used RNC webservers for the majority of their emails. Of 88 officials investigated, 51 showed no emails at all. As many as five million emails requested by Congressional investigators were therefore unavailable, lost, or deleted.
- Lurita Alexis Doan (R) Administrator of General Services, investigated for "the most pernicious of political activity" at work. The team also recommended she be "disciplined to the fullest extent". Among other things she asked GSA employees how they could "help Republican candidates". She resigned. (2000)
- J. Steven Griles (R) Deputy to the Secretary of the Interior pled guilty to obstruction of justice and was sentenced to 10 months.
- John Korsmo, chairman of the Federal Housing Finance Board, pleaded guilty to lying to congress and sentenced to 18 months of unsupervised probation and fined $5,000. (2005)
- Philip Cooney (R) appointed by Bush to chair the Council on Environmental Quality, was accused of editing government climate reports to emphasize doubts about global warming. Two days later, Cooney announced his resignation and later conceded his role in altering reports. Stating "My sole loyalty was to the President and advancing the policies of his administration".
- The Jack Abramoff Indian lobbying scandal involved Jack Abramoff, a prominent Republican lobbyist with close ties to administration officials, legislators, and staff who offered bribes as part of his lobbying efforts. Abramoff was sentenced to 4 years in prison. See also George W. Bush's legislative branch for 11 legislators and staff caught in the investigation. Executive branch personnel involved include:
1. David Safavian (R) CoS of the GSA (General Services Administration) was convicted of making false statements as part of the Jack Abramoff lobbying and corruption scandal and was sentenced to one year in prison. (2005) found guilty of blocking justice and lying, and sentenced to 18 months
2. Roger Stillwell (R) staff in the Department of the Interior, pleaded guilty and received two years suspended sentence.
3. Susan B. Ralston (R) Special Assistant to the President and Senior Advisor to Karl Rove, resigned on October 6, 2006, after it became known that she accepted gifts and passed information to her former boss Jack Abramoff.
4. J. Steven Griles (R) Deputy to the Secretary of the Interior pleaded guilty to obstruction of justice and was sentenced to 10 months
5. Italia Federici (R) staff to the Secretary of the Interior and President of the Council of Republicans for Environmental Advocacy, pled guilty to tax evasion and obstruction of justice. She was sentenced to four years' probation.
6. Jared Carpenter (R) Vice President of the Council of Republicans for Environmental Advocacy, was discovered during the Abramoff investigation and pled guilty to income tax evasion. He got 45 days, plus 4 years' probation.
7. Mark Zachares (R) staff in the Department of Labor, bribed by Abramoff, guilty of conspiracy to defraud.
8. Robert E. Coughlin (R) Deputy Chief of Staff of the Criminal Division of the Justice Department, pleaded guilty to conflict of interest after accepting bribes from Jack Abramoff. (2008)
- Kyle Foggo (R) CIA Executive Director was convicted of honest services fraud in the awarding of a government contract and sentenced to 37 months in federal prison at Pine Knot, Kentucky. On September 29, 2008, Foggo pleaded guilty to one count of the indictment, admitting that while he was the CIA executive director, he acted to steer a CIA contract to the firm of his lifelong friend, Brent R. Wilkes.
- Julie MacDonald (R) Deputy Assistant Secretary of the Department of the Interior, resigned on May 1, 2007, after giving government documents to developers (2007)
- Claude Allen (R) appointed as an advisor by President Bush (R) on Domestic Policy, was arrested for a series of felony thefts in retail stores. (2006)
- Lester Crawford, Commissioner of the Food and Drug Administration, resigned after two months. He pleaded guilty to conflict of interest and received a 3-year suspended sentence and fined $90,000 (2006)
- Abu Ghraib torture and prisoner abuse: The George W. Bush administration stated that the abuses at Abu Ghraib were isolated incidents and not indicative of U.S. policy.
- The 2003 Invasion of Iraq depended on intelligence that Saddam Hussein was developing "weapons of mass destruction" (WMDs) meaning nuclear, chemical and/or biological weapons for offensive use. As revealed by The (British) Downing Street memo "Bush wanted to remove Saddam, through military action, justified by the conjunction of terrorism and WMD. But the intelligence and the facts were being fixed around the policy" The press called this the "smoking gun". (2005)
- Yellowcake forgery – Just before the 2003 invasion of Iraq, the Bush administration presented evidence to the UN that Iraq was seeking material (yellowcake uranium) in Africa for making nuclear weapons. Though presented as true, it was later found to be not only dubious, but outright false.
- Coalition Provisional Authority Cash Payment Scandal – On June 20, 2005, the staff of the Committee on Government Reform prepared a report for Congressman Henry Waxman. It was revealed that $12 billion in cash had been delivered to Iraq by C-130 planes, on shrinkwrapped pallets of US$100 bills. The United States House Committee on Oversight and Government Reform, concluded that "Many of the funds appear to have been lost to corruption and waste.... Some of the funds could have enriched both criminals and insurgents...." Henry Waxman, commented, "Who in their right mind would send 363 tons of cash into a war zone?" A single flight to Iraq on December 12, 2003, which contained $1.5 billion in cash is said to be the largest single Federal Reserve payout in US history.
- Bush administration payment of columnists were done with federal funds to write favourably about Republican policies. Illegal payments were made to journalists Armstrong Williams, Maggie Gallagher and Michael McManus (2004–2005)
- John A. Shaw (R) was appointed by George W. Bush as Under Secretary of Defense. He was investigated on corruption although charges were never filed against him, he was asked to resign in 2004. When he refused to resign, he was fired by the Bush administration on December 10, 2004.
- The Bernard Kerik nomination in 2004 as Secretary of Homeland Security was derailed by past employment of an illegal alien as a nanny, and other improprieties. On November 4, 2009, he pleaded guilty to two counts of tax fraud and five counts of lying to the federal government and was sentenced to four years in prison.
- Felipe Sixto, Special Assistant to President George W. Bush (R) as well as deputy director in the Office of Public Liaison, was investigated for misuse of funds from July 2007 while working in the White House Office of Intergovernmental Affairs. Sixto then pled guilty to embezzlement of $644,884 from the Center for a Free Cuba. On March 18, 2009, Sixto was found guilty, resigned, repaid the theft, was fined and sentenced to 30 months in prison. (2008)
- Elliott Broidy (R) Chairman of Finance for the Republican National Committee was accused of bribing several NY state pension officials in exchange for investments in his own private equity fund. He pled guilty, but because of his cooperation the charge was dropped from a felony for attempting to provide excess gratuity, to a misdemeanor and he avoided jail, but was ordered to forfeit $18,000,000. (2008)
- Plame affair – CIA agent Valerie Plame's name was leaked by Richard Armitage, Deputy Secretary of State, to the press in retaliation for her husband's criticism of the reports used by George W. Bush to legitimize the Iraq war. Armitage admitted he was the leak but no wrongdoing was found.
- Thomas A. Scully, administrator of the Centers for Medicare and Medicaid Services (CMS), withheld information from Congress about the projected cost of the Medicare Prescription Drug, Improvement, and Modernization Act, and allegedly threatened to fire Medicare's chief actuary, Richard Foster, if Foster provided the data to Congress. (2003) A few days after the bill was signed, Scully resigned (2003).
- NSA warrantless surveillance – Shortly after the September 11 attacks in 2001, President George W. Bush (R) implemented a secret program by the National Security Agency to eavesdrop on domestic telephone calls by American citizens without warrants, thus by-passing the FISA court which must approve all such actions. (2002) In 2010, Federal Judge Vaughn Walker ruled this practice to be illegal.
- Janet Rehnquist (daughter of former Chief Justice William Rehnquist) was the appointed Inspector General of the Department of Health and Human Services by George W. Bush. In 2002, Governor Jeb Bush's (R-FL) Chief of Staff Kathleen Shanahan asked Rehnquist to delay auditing a $571 million federal overpayment to the State of Florida. Rehnquist ordered her staff to delay the investigation for five months until after the Florida elections. When Congress began an investigation into the matter, Rehnquist resigned in March 2003, saying she wanted to spend more time with her family.
- Jerry Pierce-Santos (R) Co-Financial Chairman of the Republican National Committee and a member of the Bush-Cheney '04 Finance Committee, was accused with 10 others of acting as a conduit for $17,000 in illegal contributions to an unnamed Republican candidate for federal office. He pled guilty to one count. (2003)
- John Yoo, an attorney in the Office of Legal Counsel of the Justice Department, worked closely with vice president Dick Cheney (R) and the Bush Six. He wrote memos stating the right of the president to –
1. suspend sections of the ABM Treaty without informing Congress;
2. bypass the Foreign Intelligence Surveillance Act allowing warrantless wiretapping of US Citizens within the United States by the National Security Agency;
3. state that the First Amendment and Fourth Amendments and the Takings Clause do not apply to the president in time of war as defined in the USA Patriot Act; and
4. allow enhanced interrogation techniques (torture) because provisions of the War Crimes Act, the Third Geneva Convention, and the Torture convention do not apply. Many of his memos have since been repudiated and reversed. Later review by the Justice Department reported that Yoo and Jay Bybee had used "poor judgement" in the memos, but no charges were filed.
- Carl Truscott (R) Director of the Bureau of Alcohol, Tobacco and Firearms, was appointed in 2004 but was soon under investigation for his abusive management style and allegations of lavish spending and misuse of resources, including requiring a large number of agents as personal security, spending hundreds of thousands of dollars of expensive upgrades to the ATF headquarters building, adding a new garage to his house, detailing 20 agents to help with his nephew's high school project and other examples of poor financial judgment. Truscott resigned as the ATF Director on August 4, 2006.
- John David Roy Atchison (R) Assistant U.S. Attorney for the Northern District of Florida, was arrested for intentions of having sex with a five-year-old. Atchison committed suicide before trial while in custody. (2007)
- Darleen A. Druyun was the Principal Deputy Undersecretary of the Air Force nominated by Bill Clinton in 1993. She pled guilty to inflating the price of contracts to favor her future employer, Boeing. In October 2004, she was sentenced to nine months in jail for corruption, fined $5,000, given three years of supervised release and 150 hours of community service. She began her prison term on January 5, 2005. CBS News called it "the biggest Pentagon scandal in 20 years" and said that she pleaded guilty to a felony.
- Randall L. Tobias (R) US Director of Foreign Assistance, appointed by Republican President President George W. Bush was found to have been a client in the DC Madame prostitution investigation. Having officially encouraged abstinence, he resigned his position. (2007)
- Courtney Stadd Chief of Staff of NASA and White House Liaison was accused of giving $9.6M of NASA funds to one of his clients, Mississippi State University and was convicted of ethics violations and sentenced to six months of house arrest. He was also charged with steering a separate $600,000 NASA remote sensing contract to MSU and asking for kickbacks and then submitting falsified invoices to stop a NASA investigation. To this second charge he was found guilty and sentenced to 41 months in prison. (2009)

=== Legislative branch ===
- James W. Treffinger (R-NJ) a US senatorial candidate pleaded guilty in 2003 to corruption and fraud as Chief Executive of Essex County and ordered to pay $30,000 in restitution and serve 13 months in jail.(2002)
- Ted Stevens (R-AK) U.S. Senator, was convicted of seven counts of bribery and tax evasion on October 27, 2008. He then lost re-election. Newly appointed US Attorney General Eric Holder (D) dismissed the charges "in the interest of justice" stating that the Justice Department had illegally withheld evidence from defense counsel.
- Charles Rangel (D-NY) U.S. Representative, failed to report $75,000 income from the rental of his villa in Punta Cana, Dominican Republic and was forced to pay $11,000 in back taxes. (September 2008)
- Duke Cunningham (R-CA) US Representative from the 50th District, was accused of accepting $2.5 million in bribes (which included a 42-foot yacht and a Rolls-Royce) from contractors doing business with the US government. He pled guilty to charges of conspiracy, bribery, mail fraud, and tax evasion in what came to be called the Cunningham scandal. He was tried and found guilty and sentenced to over eight years in prison. (2005)
- Rick Renzi (R-AZ) announced he would not seek another term.* He was later sentenced to three years in prison after conviction on federal corruption charges of extortion, bribery, insurance fraud, money laundering and racketeering related to a 2005 money-laundering scheme that netted the Flagstaff Republican more than $700,000. (2005)
- Mark Foley (R-FL) resigned on September 29, 2006, after sending sexually explicit messages to former Congressional pages.
- Jim Gibbons (R-NV) US House of Representatives from the 2nd District was campaigning for Governor when he walked waitress Chrissy Mazzeo to her car. She claimed he threw her against a wall and threatened to sexually assault her. He claimed she tripped and he caught her. The civil lawsuit was settled by the payment of $50,000 to Mazzeo. Six weeks later he was elected governor. See State scandals. (2006)
- Tom DeLay (R-TX) US Representative and House Majority Leader, served from 1985 to 2006 when he resigned his position to undergo trial for conspiring to launder corporate money into political donations and money laundering during the 2002 elections. On November 24, 2010, DeLay was found guilty and was sentenced to three years in prison and 10 years' probation, respectively. The ruling was overturned on appeal. On September 19, 2013, the conviction was overturned.
- Jack Abramoff Indian lobbying scandal (R) The lobbyist found guilty of conspiracy, tax evasion and corruption of public officials in three different courts in a wide-ranging investigation. He served 70 months and was fined $24.7 million. See George W. Bush's executive branch for eight others caught in the investigation. Legislators and staff involved include;
1. Tom DeLay (R-TX) US Representative and House Majority Leader was reprimanded twice by the House Ethics Committee and his aides indicted (2004–2005); eventually DeLay himself was investigated in October 2005 in connection with the Abramoff scandal, but not indicted. DeLay resigned from the House June 9, 2006. DeLay was found to have illegally channeled funds from Americans for a Republican Majority to Republican state legislator campaigns. He was convicted of two counts of money laundering and conspiracy in 2010. His conviction was overturned on appeal.
2. Michael Scanlon (R) Communications Director to Tom DeLay, worked for Abramoff and pled guilty to bribery.
3. Tony Rudy (R) Deputy CoS to Tom DeLay, pleaded guilty to conspiracy.
4. Jim Ellis (R) Executive Director of Tom DeLay's Political Action Committee Americans for a Republican Majority (ARMPAC), was found guilty of money laundering.
5. John Colyandro (R) Executive Director of Tom DeLay's political action committee, Texans for a Republican Majority (TRMPAC), was indicted by Texas for money laundering
6. Bob Ney (R-OH) US Representative pleaded guilty to conspiracy and making false statements as a result of his receiving trips from Abramoff in exchange for legislative favors. Ney received 30 months in prison.
7. William Heaton (R) CoS to Bob Ney, pleaded guilty to one count of conspiracy to commit fraud admitting to conspiring with Ney, Jack Abramoff and others to accept vacations, meals, tickets, and contributions to Ney's campaign in exchange for Ney benefitting Abramoff's clients. (2006)
8. Neil Volz (R) former CoS to Bob Ney, pleaded guilty to one count of conspiracy in 2006 charges stemming from his work for Bob Ney. In 2007 he was sentenced to two years' probation, 100 hours' community service, and a fine of $2,000.
9. John Albaugh (R) former CoS to Ernest Istook (R-OK), pled guilty to accepting bribes connected to the Federal Highway Bill. Istook was not charged. (2008)
10. James Hirni (R) former staff to Tim Hutchinson (R-AR), was charged with wire fraud for giving a staffer for Don Young (R) of Alaska a bribe in exchange for amendments to the Federal Highway Bill. (2008)
11. Kevin A. Ring (R) former staff to John Doolittle (R-CA), was convicted of five charges of corruption and honest services fraud. sentenced to 20 months.
12. Fraser Verrusio (R) Policy Director for US Senator Don Young (R-AK) of the Transportation and Infrastructure Committee was investigated during the Jack Abramoff scandals. Verrusio drafted favorable federal legislation for equipment rental companies through the Abramoff firm. He was accused of accepting bribes, such as tickets to the World Series and then lying about it. He was sentenced to a half day in jail, 2 years probation and fined. (2011)
- David Vitter (R-LA) US Senator, Vitters' name was discovered in the address book of DC Madam Deborah Jeane Palfrey. He admitted his adultery and lost his race for governor. (2007)
- Cunningham scandal named after Randy "Duke" Cunningham (R-CA) US Representative, pleaded guilty on November 28, 2005, to charges of conspiracy to commit bribery, mail fraud, wire fraud and tax evasion. Sentenced to over eight years.
1. Mitchell Wade private contractor and "co-conspirator" with Cunningham
2. Kyle Foggo Director of the CIA and friend to Wilkes, convicted of fraud
3. Brent R. Wilkes private contractor
- Tan Nguyen (R-CA) US Representative candidate for the 47th District, was convicted of voter intimidation. He lost the election and was sentenced to one year in prison and six months in a halfway house. (2006)
- Adam Taff (R-KS) 3rd US Congressional District candidate, was indicted for converting funds given for his campaign and used them for his personal use and for wire fraud in a deal to buy a home. He was found guilty and sentenced to 15 months in prison. (2006)
- William J. Jefferson (D-LA) US Representative had $90,000 in cash in his home freezer seized by the FBI in August 2005. He was re-elected anyway, but lost in 2008. Jefferson was convicted of 11 counts of bribery and sentenced to 13 years on November 13, 2009, and his chief of staff Brett Pfeffer was sentenced to 84 months in a related case.
- Bill Janklow (R-SD) US Representative from South Dakota's at-large-district was convicted of second-degree manslaughter for running a stop sign and killing a motorcyclist. He resigned from the House and was given 100 days in the county jail and three years' probation (2003)
- Jim Traficant (D-OH) was found guilty on ten felony counts of financial corruption and was sentenced to 8 years in prison and expelled from the House. (2002)
- John E. Sweeney (R-NY) US Representative from 20th US District, was arrested in 2007 and again in 2009 for DWI. He was sentenced to 23 days in jail with 3 years' probation. (2009)
- Vito Fossella (R-NY) US Representative, 13th District, was arrested for drunk driving. He was found guilty of driving with twice the legal limit and sentenced to 5 days in prison. This led to the revelation that the married congressman had a longtime affair with another woman which had produced a child. He did not run for re-election. (2008)

== Barack Obama (D) administrations (2009–2017) ==
=== Executive branch ===
- Katherine Archuleta (D) Director of the Office of Personnel Management, took responsibility for cyber intrusions that allowed the theft of data. She resigned on July 10, 2015.
- General Eric Shinseki (D) Secretary of Veterans Affairs took responsibility when VA officials in Phoenix, AZ, hospital lied about wait times for veterans to see a doctor, Shinseki resigned. See Veterans Health Administration scandal of 2014.
- Steven T. Miller, Acting Commissioner of the Internal Revenue Service, took responsibility after the IRS admitted to investigating groups associated with the Tea Party to see if they met the criteria for tax exemptions. See IRS targeting controversy It was found that the IRS had also investigated progressive groups, and there had been no intentional wrongdoing. Other actions arising from the controversy included:
  - Lois Lerner, head of the IRS Office of Exempt Organizations, stated she had not done anything wrong and then took the Fifth before the House Committee on Oversight and Government Reform. She retired in 2013 after an investigation found that she had neglected her duties.
  - Joseph H. Grant, Commissioner of the IRS Tax-exempt and Government Entities division, resigned on May 16, 2013.
- Terence Flynn (R) member of the National Labor Relations Board, after being accused of ethical violations for leaking information to the National Association of Manufacturers. He resigned.
- Martha N. Johnson (D) head of the General Services Administration, fired two top GSA officials and then resigned herself after it was revealed that $822,000 had been spent in Las Vegas on a four-day training conference for 300 GSA employees. (2010)
- David Petraeus (I) resigned as Director of the CIA on November 9, 2012, and later pleaded guilty to a misdemeanor charge of mishandling classified materials, which he gave to his biographer with whom he was having a sexual relationship. He was given two years' probation and fined $100,000. See Petraeus scandal (2012)
- William Mendoza, Director of the White House Initiative on American Indian and Alaska Native Education, used his government issued iPhone to take pictures up the skirts of several women on the D.C. Metro. He pled guilty and was sentenced to 90 days in jail, which were suspended. (2016)
- Barvetta Singletary, a White House aide was charged with assault after firing a shot into the floor of her boyfriend. She resigned the next day. (2015)

=== Legislative branch ===
- J. Nathan Deal (R-GA) U.S. Representative from District 9, was under investigation for financial improprieties and using his staff to pressure Georgia officials to continue a vehicle inspection program that benefitted his family's auto business. An initial report by the US Office of Congressional Ethics called for further investigation, whereupon Deal resigned. (2010)
- Mark Souder (R-IN) US Representative, was a staunch advocate of abstinence and family values, Souder resigned to avoid an investigation into his admitted extramarital affair with a female staffer. (2010)
- David G. Bowser (R) Chief of Staff for Paul Broun (R) U.S. Representative for Georgia's 10th Congressional District, was accused of misusing government funds by using them to pay for a political consultant to work on the election of Collins. Bowser was found guilty of obstruction, concealment and making false statements and sentenced to four months in prison and two years' supervision. (2016)
- Chaka Fattah (D-PA) from 2nd district was found guilty of 23 charges including racketeering, money laundering and fraud. He was sentenced to 10 years and resigned from Congress on June 23, 2016.
- Joe Wilson (R-SC) US Representative from the 2nd District, shouted "You lie!" at President Barack Obama during a State of the Union Speech. He later apologized. (2009)
- Anthony Weiner (D-NY) from New York's 9th congressional district resigned from Congress in June 2011 when the first of what would become multiple sexting scandals were made public.
- David Wu (D-OR) US Representative for Oregon's 1st congressional district announced he would resign from Congress, four days after a report that a young woman called his office complaining of an "unwanted sexual encounter" with the congressman.
- Chris Lee (R-NY) US Representative for New York's 26th congressional district resigned after he solicited a woman on Craigslist and emailed a shirtless photo of himself. (2011)
- Jeffrey A. Garcia (D), Campaign Manager for US Representative Joe Garcia (D-FL) (no relation), was accused of voter fraud for unlawfully submitting online absentee-ballot requests for thousands of unsuspecting voters. He pled guilty and was sentenced to 90 days in jail and 18 months of probation. (2010)
- Dennis Hastert (R-IL) US Representative, pleaded guilty to charges that he violated banking rules and lied to the FBI in a scheme to pay $3.5 million in hush money to conceal sexual misconduct with an underage boy from his days as a high school wrestling coach, from 1965 to 1981. (2015)
- Aaron Schock (R-IL) US Representative resigned from office after evidence surfaced that he used campaign funds for travel, redecorated his office with taxpayer funds to resemble the sets of the Downton Abbey TV series, and otherwise spent campaign and/or taxpayer money on other questionable personal uses. (2015)
- Benjamin Cole (R) Senior Adviser to US Representative Aaron Schock US Representative, resigned after he allegedly condemned "hood rats" and "black miscreants" in internet posts. Schock's office stated, "I am extremely disappointed by the inexcusable and offensive online comments made by a member of my staff."
- Matthew P. Pennell (R) Constituent Services Representative for US Representative Tim Huelskamp (R-KS) as well as GOP State Party Director was arrested on 17 counts of alleged child sex crimes. He was found guilty and sentenced to 12 months in prison. (2015)
- Brett O'Donnell (R), Communications Director for US Representative Cathy McMorris Rodgers (R-WA), pleaded guilty to lying to investigators from the House Office of Congressional Ethics about working for Rodgers while being paid with campaign money, thus becoming the first person to be convicted of lying to the House OCE.
- Thaddeus McCotter (R-MI) US Representative resigned his Congressional seat after four of his staff were convicted by the state of Michigan of falsifying signatures on McCotter's reelection petitions for the 2012 elections. Michigan Attorney General Bill Schuette (R) blamed McCotter for running a slipshod, leaderless operation. "The congressman has resigned in disgrace", Schuette said, though McCotter was not charged.
1. Paul Seewald worked for McCotter as his district director of the Michigan's 11th congressional district. He pleaded guilty to nine counts of falsely signing a nominating petition as circulator. He was sentenced to two years' probation and 100 hours of community service, and ordered to pay court costs and fees.
2. Don Yowchuang worked for McCotter as Deputy District Director of the Michigan 11th Congressional District. He pleaded guilty to ten counts of forgery and six counts of falsely signing a nominating petition and was sentenced to three years of probation, 200 hours of community service, court costs and fees.
3. Mary M. Turnbull was McCotter's Representative to the Michigan 11th Congressional District. She was convicted of conspiring to commit a legal act in an illegal manner and falsely signing a nominating petition. She was sentenced to two years of probation, a day in jail, and 200 hours of community service. Turnbull was also ordered to pay a $1,440 fine. In addition, she is forbidden from any participation in elections or the political process.
4. Lorianne O'Brady worked as a scheduler for McCotter in the Michigan 11th Congressional District. She pleaded no contest to charges that she falsely claimed to have legally collected signatures to get McCotter on the ballot when she actually had not. She was sentenced to 20 days in jail and a work program plus $2,625 in fines and court costs.
- David Rivera (R-FL) was indicted with Campaign Manager Ana Alliegro, who pled guilty to violation of US campaign laws in an $81,000 campaign-finance scheme to secretly prop up a Democratic candidate, Lamar Sternad to weaken the position of Rivera's rival in the 2012 Democratic primary. Rivera was fined $456,000 by the Federal Election Commission.
1. Ana Alliegro (R), the Campaign Manager for David Rivera (R-FL), pleaded guilty to violation of US campaign laws. She was given six months in jail and six months of house arrest plus two years of probation. (2014)
2. Lamar Sternad was sentenced to seven months in jail.(2014)
- Rick Renzi (R-AZ) US Representative on June 12, 2013, was found guilty of 17 counts against him, which included wire fraud, conspiracy, extortion, racketeering, money laundering, and making false statements to insurance regulators.
- Mike Crapo (R-ID) US Senator was arrested on December 23, 2012, and later pleaded guilty to drinking and driving in a Virginia court on January 4, 2012. The court fined him $250 and received a one-year suspension of his driver's license. He was also sentenced to 180 days in prison, but served no time.
- Lisa Wilson-Foley (R) Candidate for U.S. Representative from the Connecticut 5th District, was accused of campaign irregularities and fraud, which included hiding illegal campaign contributions and covering up their origins. She was found guilty and sentenced to five months in prison with five months home confinement. (2012)
1. John G. Rowland (R) Campaign Consultant to Candidate for US Representative, Republican Lisa Wilson-Foley. Rowland was found guilty of conspiring to make illegal campaign contributions, making false statements and conspiracy. He was sentenced to 30 months in prison. (2012)
- Trey Radel (R-FL) US Representative, was arrested on October 29, 2013, in Washington, D.C. for possession of cocaine after purchasing the drug from an undercover law enforcement officer. As a first-time offender, he pleaded guilty to a misdemeanor in a Washington, D.C. court, and was sentenced to one year of probation and fined $250. Radel took a leave of absence from office to undergo substance abuse treatment following his conviction. Following treatment, he initially returned to office with the intent of finishing his term, but eventually resigned on January 27, 2014.
- Annette Bosworth (R-SD) candidate for the US Senate was found guilty of 6 counts of filing false documents. She was sentenced to 3 years probation, community service plus costs. (2014)
- Jesse Jackson Jr. (D-IL) US Representative pleaded guilty to one felony count of fraud for using $750,000 of campaign money to buy personal items such as stuffed animals, elk heads and fur capes.
- Laura Richardson (D-CA) US Representative, was found guilty on seven counts of violating US House rules by improperly using her staff to campaign for her, destroying the evidence and tampering with witness testimony. The House Ethics Committee ordered Richardson to pay a fine of $10,000. (2012)
- John Ensign (R-NV) US Senate, resigned his seat on May 3, 2011, just before the Senate Ethics Committee could examine possible fiscal violations in connection with his extramarital affair with Cynthia Hampton. (2011) (see Federal sex scandals)
1. Doug Hampton (R) aide to Ensign in what became the John Ensign scandal reached a separate plea deal with prosecutors in May 2012, the details of which have not yet been released.
- Michael Grimm (R-NY) US Representative, pleaded guilty to tax fraud on December 23, 2014, and was sentenced to eight months in federal prison. Pardoned by Donald Trump.
- Ron Paul (R-TX) US House Representative, ran in the Republican primary for president in 2012, see Ron Paul 2012 presidential campaign. The campaign was marked by a scandal in which several of his close staff were indicted and found guilty of not properly disclosing on campaign finance forms the hiring of Iowa Republican State Senator Kent Sorenson, who changed his endorsement from Republican Michele Bachmann to Paul. Paul denies any knowledge of the deal and was not charged. (2011) The aides were:
1. Jesse Benton (R) Campaign Chairman for Ron Paul (R-TX) concealed over $73,000 in payments to Iowa State Senator Kent Sorenson to convince him to flip his presidential endorsement from Michele Bachmann to Ron Paul. He was convicted of conspiring to cause false records. He was sentenced to 6 months' home confinement, fined $10,000 and given two years' probation. (2016)
2. John Tate (R) Campaign Manager for US Representative Ron Paul (R-TX) was indicted for concealing over $73,000 in payments to Iowa State Senator Kent Sorenson to convince him to flip his presidential endorsement from Michele Bachmann to Paul. He was convicted of conspiracy. He was sentenced to 6 months' home confinement, 2 years' probation and fined $10,000 in 2016.
3. Dimitri Kesari Deputy Campaign Manager for US Representative Ron Paul (R-TX) was convicted of causing false records concerning charges of hiring Iowa State Senator Sorensen, during the 2012 presidential campaign. He was sentenced to three months in jail. (2012)
- Fred Pagan (R) Office Administrator to US Senator Thad Cochran (R-MS) pled guilty to possession of methamphetamine with intent to distribute and was sentenced to 30 months in prison. (2016)
- Scott DesJarlais (R-TN) MD, U.S. Representative, ran for re-election on an anti-abortion platform, it was then discovered that he had tried to persuade his wife to have two abortions, and tried to persuade his mistress (who was also his patient), to have one as well. He also admitted under oath that while a married physician at Grandview Medical Center in Jasper, Tennessee, he had six affairs with three co-workers, two patients and a drug representative. He was investigated, pled guilty and was fined. (2012)
- Robert Decheine (D) CoS to U.S. Representative Steve Rothman (D-NJ), was sentenced to 18 months in prison for soliciting sex from a minor. (2011)
- Adam Kuhn (R) CoS to U.S. Representative Steve Stivers (R-OH), resigned abruptly after a former porn actress posted an explicit photo of his penis online. (2014)
- David Wihby (R) top aide to US Senator Kelly Ayotte (R-NH) resigned after he was arrested in a prostitution sting in Nashua. (2015)
- Corrine Brown (D-FL) US Representative, was found guilty of fraud for using $800K from a fake charity for her own personal use. She was sentenced to 5 years. (2018)
1. Ronnie Simmons (D) CoS to U.S. Representative Corrine Brown (D-FL) pled guilty to fraud. (2017)
- McCrae Dowless (R) Campaign Consultant for US Republican candidate Mark Harris (North Carolina politician) in NC's 9th US Congressional District. Dowless was charged with multiple counts of illegal ballot handling and conspiracy in both the 2016 and 2018 elections. He was convicted of defrauding the government and sentenced to 6 months in prison and fined. (2018)
- Steve Buyer (R-IN) US Representative from the Fourth District was convicted of insider trading and sentenced to 22 years in prison and to forfeit $354,027. (2025)
- Steve Stockman (R-TX) from District 36, was arrested for using funds from charities for his own personal use. He was convicted of 23 felony counts of money laundering and sentenced to 10 years in prison, and ordered to pay $1 million in restitution. On December 22, 2020, President Donald Trump commuted Stockman's prison term.
1. Thomas Dodd (R), Congressional Special Assistant and campaign worker said Stockman’s purpose was "to bilk conservative foundations out of at least $775,000 in donations meant for charitable purposes or voter education". Dodd pled guilty and was sentenced to 18 months and ordered to pay a fine of $800,000.
2. Jason Posey (R), staffer for Stockman, entered a guilty plea to counts of wire fraud, mail fraud, and money laundering. He admitted that at Stockman's direction he and Dodd illegally funneled hundreds of thousands of dollars from charitable foundations to pay for Stockman's campaigns and personal expenses. On April 2, 2019, Posey was sentenced to 18 months and fined $720,000.

=== Judicial branch ===
- Mark E. Fuller (R) US Judge of the Middle District of Alabama, appointed by Republican George W. Bush was found guilty of domestic violence, sentenced to domestic training and forced to resign. (2015)
- G. Thomas Porteous US Judge of Eastern Louisiana appointed by Democrat Bill Clinton, was unanimously impeached by the US House of Representatives on charges of bribery and perjury in March 2010. He was convicted by the US Senate and removed from office. (2010)
- Samuel B. Kent (R) US Judge Federal District in Galveston, Texas was sentenced to 33 months in prison for lying about sexually harassing two female employees. He had been appointed to office by President George H. W. Bush (R) in 1990. Resigned after being impeached on June 10, 2009.
- Jack T. Camp (R) Senior Federal U.S. Judge for the Northern District of Georgia, who was appointed by Republican George W. Bush, was arrested while trying to purchase cocaine from an FBI agent. Pled guilty to three criminal charges and was sentenced to 30 days in jail, 400 hours' community service and fined.
- Richard F. Cebull (R) Federal Judge for the District of Montana, was found to have sent hundreds of racist and sexist emails. After an investigation led to calls for his impeachment, Cebull took senior status and then resigned. (2013)

== Donald Trump (R) first administration (2017–2021) ==
=== Executive branch ===
- Donald Trump (R) President, First impeachment of Donald Trump. In 2019, Trump was accused of trading $400 million in congressionally approved aid to Ukraine in exchange for damaging information on Presidential Candidate Joseph Biden (D) and his son Hunter Biden known as the Trump–Ukraine scandal. He was impeached by the House for Obstruction of Congress and Abuse of Power. The charges were presented to the US Senate for trial, where he was acquitted of Abuse of Power with a vote of 52–48 and of Obstruction of Congress by 53–47. (2019)
- Donald Trump (R) President, Second impeachment of Donald Trump (January 6 United States Capitol attack). On January 6, 2021, Trump spoke at a rally near the Capitol, claiming that the 2020 election had been 'stolen' and that he would have won had the votes been counted fairly. He told the crowd that if they didn't "fight like hell", "you're not going to have a country anymore." Afterwards, a mob formed in front of the Capitol, and assaulted police officers, broke windows, forced their way inside and vandalized the building. One policeman and four marchers died and 140 police officers were injured. On January 12, 2021, the House passed a resolution calling for Vice President Mike Pence and Trump's still sitting cabinet to remove Trump from office under the 25th Amendment because he was unfit to serve the remaining 8 days of his term. Pence and the cabinet refused.
- Donald Trump (R) President. On January 13, 2021, the day after Vice President Mike Pence and the cabinet refused to remove Trump from office, the House impeached Trump again alleging his incitement of insurrection under the Fourteenth Amendment. The Senate vote was 57–43 to find him guilty, but a 67-vote supermajority vote was required for conviction.
- Donald Trump (R) President, was accused of sexual assault by writer E. Jean Carroll in the Bergdorf Goodman department store in New York City in 1996. In 2019 she described the incident in a book. Trump denied her charges and publicly ridiculed her. She then sued Trump for defamation of character. At trial, the jury found Trump guilty of sexual assault for forcibly kissing her, pulling down her clothes and penetrating her with his fingers. In 2023, Carroll was awarded $5 million in damages. The following year, Carroll was awarded an additional $83.3 million in damages.
- Donald Trump (R) President, his company, executives, and two eldest sons were accused by NY Attorney General Letitia James, of massively exaggerating his net worth. He was found guilty of having lied and was fined $355 million. The ruling also imposes a three-year ban on Trump serving as an officer or director of any New York company.(2023) An appeals court 5-0 overturned the 500 million civil fraud penalty against President Trump and his two sons.
- Allen Weisselberg (R) Chief Financial Officer of the Trump Organization, was accused of larceny, tax fraud, and false Social Security claims. He was found guilty, sentenced to five months in jail, and eventually paid more than two million in back taxes and penalties. In 2024, he was found guilty of perjury and sentenced to another five months in prison.
- Elliott Broidy (R) Deputy Finance Chairman of the Republican National Committee, was accused of failing to register as a lobbyist for a foreign individual, a Malaysian national. Broidy pled guilty to one count of conspiracy but was never sentenced. On January 19, 2021, prior to sentencing, President Trump (R) granted Mr. Broidy a full and unconditional pardon. (2018)
- Paul Manafort (R) 2016 Campaign Manager for President Donald Trump (R), was charged with 18 counts of tax and bank fraud for keeping $65 million in foreign bank accounts and spending $15 million on himself. He was found guilty on 8 counts. In March 2019, he was sentenced to 7 1/2 years in prison, although he was later released to home confinement.
- Rick Gates (R) 2016 Deputy Campaign Chairman to President Donald Trump (R), pleaded guilty to conspiracy and lying to investigators concerning his work lobbying with Ukraine as well as tax and bank fraud. He was sentenced to 45 days in prison and three years' probation. (2018)

==== Cabinet and Assistants (18) ====
- Rob Porter (R) served as White House Staff Secretary. He resigned his position after domestic abuse allegations from both of his former wives came to public attention.
- Chad Wolf (R) acting U.S. Secretary of Homeland Security was found unlawfully appointed by Nicholas Garaufis of the U.S. District Court for the Eastern District of New York as the DHS failed to follow the order of succession as it was lawfully designated. See 2019–2021 Department of Homeland Security appointment disputes
- Tom Price (R) U.S. Secretary of Health and Human Services was forced to resign on September 29, 2017, after it was discovered that he spent hundreds of thousands of taxpayer dollars on private flights.
- Ryan Zinke (R) U.S. Secretary of the Interior, when the Inspector General of the Interior Department referred one of several investigations about Zinke to the Justice Department. He was then investigated for his conduct in office and questionable real estate dealings in Montana. He resigned in December 2018.
- William Perry Pendley (R) acting Director of Bureau of Land Management within the U.S. Department of the Interior was removed from office by Judge Brian Morris of the U.S. District Court of Montana, who ruled that Pendley had been running the agency unlawfully for 424 days without US Senate approval, in violation of the Appointment Clause of the U.S. Constitution and the Federal Vacancies Reform Act (FVRA). It found that David Bernhardt (R) Secretary of the Interior, illegally promoted Pendley from deputy director of the B. L. M. for Policy and Programs to "temporary" Director of the Bureau of Land Management.(2020)
- Alex Acosta (R) U.S. Secretary of Labor resigned on July 12, 2019, after a contentious news conference about his role as a U.S. attorney in 2008, when he dismissed federal charges against Jeffrey Epstein, "that allowed the financier to plead guilty to lesser offenses in a sex-crimes case involving underage girls". Epstein committed suicide on August 10, 2019 in the Metropolitan Correctional Center, New York City. After Price, Pruitt, Shulkin and Zinke, and Nielson Acosta became the sixth Trump Cabinet member to resign or be fired.
- Michael Flynn (D) National Security Advisor (United States), was forced to resign on February 13, 2017, over conversations he had with Russian envoys about sanctions during the transition. On December 1, 2017, Flynn pleaded guilty to charges of lying to the FBI as a plea bargain. (2017)
- Scott Pruitt (R) Administrator of the U.S. Environmental Protection Agency, resigned citing increasing numbers of investigations into his administration. The EPA's own Chief Ethics Official had been pushing for independent studies into Pruitt's actions and 13 other separate investigations were under way, including alleged corruption for personal gain, salary increases without White House approval, use of government staff on personal projects and unnecessary spending on offices and security. He resigned July 5, 2018.
1. Albert Kelly (R) EPA Superfund Task Force Director and top aide to EPA Chief Scott Pruitt (R), resigned amid scrutiny of his previous actions as leader of a bank in Oklahoma which led to $125,000 fine and lifetime ban from banking. (2018)
2. Pasquale "Nino" Perrotta, EPA Security Administrator, resigned after allegations of lavish spending and improper contracts (2018)
3. Samantha Dravis (R) EPA Associate Administrator and Senior Counsel in the Office of Policy resigned abruptly after allegations of being a no show employee. (2018)
- Donald Kempf Jr. (R) Deputy Assistant to the U.S. Attorney General. An investigation concluded that he had viewed sexually explicit images on government computers and then made false statements about it under oath. He resigned. (2018)
- William C. Bradford (R) resigned from the U.S. Department of Energy Office of Indian Energy amid reports that he had made racial slurs directed at Barack Obama on Disqus and Twitter. Bradford had claimed that some of the comments were the result of identity theft and not his. (2017)
- Brenda Fitzgerald (R) Director of the Centers for Disease Control and Prevention, under the U.S. Department of Health and Human Services was forced to resign on January 31, 2018, after it was discovered that she bought stock in tobacco, the leading cause of preventable death in the US, creating a conflict of interest.
- Taylor Weyeneth (R) Deputy CoS at the White House office of National Drug Control Policy, resigned when it was revealed the 24-year-old had no qualifications for the position and no related work history other than working on President Trump's 2016 campaign. (2018).
- Vivieca Wright Simpson, Chief of Staff to David Shulkin (I) Secretary of U.S. Department of Veterans Affairs resigned after an Inspector General report charged that she altered an email to make it appear Shulkin was getting an award during a trip to Europe in order to gain approval to use taxpayer dollars to pay for Shulkin's wife to accompany him. Six weeks later, Donald Trump fired Shulkin via Twitter.
- Tony Tooke, Chief of the US Forest Service part of the U.S. Department of Agriculture, after a series of sexual harassment and retaliation accusations, he resigned. (2018)
- Mel Watts (D) Director of the Federal Housing Finance Agency. Watts resigned after a congressional investigation concluded that he had sexually harassed one of his female employees. (2019)

==== Lawyers (5) ====
- Rudy Giuliani (R) Lawyer for Donald Trump was accused of making "demonstrably false and misleading" statements about the results of the 2020 presidential election, which he claimed was stolen from Donald Trump. The Manhattan appeals court revoked his law license and ruled he is no longer allowed to practice law in the state of New York. (2024)
- Sidney Powell (R) Attorney for Donald Trump (R) was charged with racketeering for Attempts to overturn the 2020 United States presidential election, see also Georgia election racketeering prosecution. She and 17 others, were accused of attempting to access Georgia voting machines and copy their software and data. In a plea deal, she pled guilty to six counts of conspiring to interfere with the performance of election duties. She was sentenced to six years of probation, fined $6,000 plus fees, and also agree to testify truthfully against her co-defendants at future trials. (2020)
- Jenna Ellis (R) Lawyer for Donald Trump. She was accused of planning to disrupt and delay the congressional certification of election results and urging state legislators to illegally appoint new electors after the election. See Attempts to overturn the 2020 United States presidential election. She pled guilty to one felony count of aiding and abetting false statements and was sentenced to five years of probation, community service, apologize to the people of Georgia, pay restitution and swear to tell the truth in future cases. (2023) See Georgia election racketeering prosecution.
- Kenneth Chesebro (I) Lawyer for Donald Trump. Chesebro was charged with 19 others, of racketeering for commandeering voting information in an attempt to reverse the election of (2016). He was also accused of coordinating a plan to have 16 Georgia Republicans declare themselves the state's "duly elected and qualified" electors to replace the original electors. He pled guilty to one felony charge of conspiracy. (2020) See Georgia election racketeering prosecution.
- Michael Cohen (R) Personal Attorney to President Donald Trump (R) and vice-president to the Trump organization, pleaded guilty to tax evasion, bank fraud and illegal campaign contributions. He also helped arrange non-disclosure agreements to Stormy Daniels and Karen McDougal who allegedly had affairs with Trump. Cohen pleaded guilty to eight counts of tax evasion and making false statements. (2018)

==== Advisors and Staff (7) ====
- Peter Navarro (R) Assistant to President Trump and Director of the Office of Trade and Manufacturing Policy. In February 2022, he was subpoenaed to testify before the United States House Select Committee on the January 6 Attack, but Navarro claimed he had executive privilege and refused to appear. He was indicted by the U.S. Justice Department for Contempt of Congress, found guilty, and on January 25, 2024, he was sentenced to four months in jail and fined.
- Rob Porter (R) White House staff secretary, resigned from the position on February 7, 2018, following public allegations of spousal abuse from his two ex-wives. The allegations were supported by photographs of a black eye and a restraining order.
- David Sorensen (R) White House speechwriter, resigned after his ex-wife Jessica Corbett came forward with abuse allegations. (2018)
- George Papadopoulos (R) Foreign Policy advisor, pleaded guilty to making false statements to FBI agents relating to contacts he had with agents of the Russian government while working for the Trump campaign. He was sentenced to 14 days in prison, 12 months' probation, and 200 hours' community service. (2017)
- Michael Flynn (D) National Security Advisor, was forced to resign on February 13, 2017, over conversations he had with Russian envoys about sanctions during the transition. On December 1, 2017, Flynn pleaded guilty to charges of lying to the FBI as a plea bargain. (2017)
- Steve Bannon (R) Chief White House Strategist and Counselor to President Donald Trump was subpoenaed to appear before the United States House Select Committee on the January 6 Attack and answer questions. He refused to appear or cooperate. He was then cited for Contempt of Congress and was found guilty of refusing to appear. On July 22, 2022, the jury found Bannon guilty on both charges and was sentenced to four months in prison with a $6,500 fine. (2022)
- Steve Bannon (R) Senior Counselor to the President pled guilty in NY to fraud, money laundering, and conspiracy for using $250,000 from the We Build the Wall organization for his own use. He was sentenced to three years.
- B. J. Pak (R) U.S. Attorney for the Northern District of Georgia appointed by President Trump. On January 3, 2021, in a recorded call, Trump called top Georgia officials and pressured them to help him "find" more votes. During the call Trump referenced to Georgia's Atlanta and Fulton counties and a "never-Trumper U.S. attorney there". Pak resigned the next day citing "unforeseen circumstances". (2021)

=== Legislative branch ===
- Katie Hill (D-CA) U.S. Representative, resigned following the start of a House Ethics Committee investigation involving Hill's alleged improper relationship with a male subordinate. She also admitted to an inappropriate relationship with a female campaign staffer and resigned. See 2017–18 United States political sexual scandals (2019)
- Oliver Schwab (R) Chief of Staff for US Representative David Schweikert (R-AZ), received over $200,000 in illegal campaign contributions. When an investigation was called, he resigned. (2018)
- Duncan Hunter (R-CA) 52 District, was indicted in federal court on 59 charges, including wire fraud and using campaign funds for personal use. (2018) He pleaded guilty on December 3, 2019 and was sentenced to 11 years. Pardoned by President Donald Trump (R) in December 2020.
1. Margaret Jankowski Hunter (R) Campaign Manager and wife to US Representative Duncan D. Hunter (R) was indicted for misuse of $200,000 in campaign donations. She pled guilty to one count of conspiracy and was sentenced to 8 months of house arrest and probation. Pardoned by Donald Trump.
- Tom Garrett (R-VA) US Representative from Virginia's 5th District, was accused by four of his staff of using them for personal chores such as walking his dog and driving his kids. An investigation was begun, after which Garrett suddenly announced he was an alcoholic and would not seek re-election. (2018)
- Chris Collins (R-NY) U.S. Representative, was arrested by the FBI and charged with wire fraud, conspiracy to commit securities fraud, seven counts of securities fraud, and lying to the FBI, for tipping off his son and his daughter-in-law's father with insider trading information. (2018) On October 1, 2019, he announced that he would resign his seat, just prior to an expected change of plea to guilty. He pled guilty to securities fraud and was sentenced to 26 months in prison.
- Al Franken (D-MN) US Senator, resigned on January 2, 2018, after accusations of sexual misconduct. See 2017–18 United States political sexual scandals
- Clint Reed (R) CoS for US Senator Marco Rubio (R-FL) was fired for allegations of "improper conduct" and threats to withhold employment benefits from an unnamed subordinate. (2018)
- Steve Stockman (R-TX) orchestrated a scheme to steal money from charitable foundations and the individuals who ran them. The funds were used to finance Stockman's re-election campaigns as well as for personal expenses. He was convicted on 23 felony counts of perjury, fraud and money laundering and sentenced to 10 years. (2018)
1. Jason T. Posey (R) Director of Special Projects and Campaign Treasurer for Stephen E. Stockman at the personal direction and supervision of Stockman, Posey took almost one million dollars from various sources and illegally funneled it into Stockman's 2014 Senate campaign. He pled guilty to mail fraud, wire fraud, money laundering and conduit contributions. (2013)
2. Thomas Dodd (R) Special Assistant to Steve Stockman pled guilty to two conspiracy charges and agreed to cooperate with prosecutors. (2013)
- Blake Farenthold (R-TX) US Representative, resigned in the wake of reports he used public funds to settle a sexual harassment lawsuit and had created an intensely hostile work environment for women in his congressional office. See 2017–18 United States political sexual scandals
- Pat Meehan (R-PA) US Representative, resigned following the revelation that he used taxpayers' money to settle a sexual harassment claim brought by a female staff member. See 2017–18 United States political sexual scandals
- Dana Rohrabacher (R-CA) US Representative, was charged with improper use of campaign contributions for his role in providing money to his Campaign Manager Rhonda Carmony's scheme to promote a decoy Democratic candidate in the state assembly election of Republican Scott Baugh. Rohrabacher was found guilty and fined $50,000. (2012)
- Jack Wenpo Wu (R) Treasurer for the Re-election Campaign of US Representative Dana Rohrabacher (R-CA), embezzled over $300,000. He was repaying the money when he was found guilty and sentenced to one year in prison plus five years' probation. (2012)
- Trent Franks (R-AZ) US Representative from the 8th District abruptly resigned when confronted about discussing surrogacy with female staffers. (2017).
- Anthony Barry (R) Deputy Campaign Manager to US Senator Martha McSally (R-AZ) was accused of embezzling over $100,000 from McSally's campaign. He pled guilty to unlawful conversion of campaign funds and awaits sentencing. (2018)
- David Schweikert (R-AZ) US Representative, after a two-year probe by the bipartisan House Ethics Committee Schweikert was unanimously found guilty of campaign finance violations including urging federal staff members to fundraise for his campaign, misusing his Allowance for unofficial purposes, and demonstrating a "lack of candor and due diligence" as well as giving "untruthful testimony". He was fined $50,000. (2020)
- Timothy F. Murphy (R-PA) US Representative, the married, anti-abortion congressman resigned just before an investigation could begin concerning his allegedly urging his mistress to seek an abortion. (2017)
- Greg Gianforte (R-MT) US Representative, body slammed reporter Ben Jacobs. Gianforte was then found guilty of assault and sentenced to 40 hours of community service, 20 hours of anger management, a 180-day deferred sentence, a $385 fine and court fee. As part of his settlement with Jacobs, Gianforte donated $50,000 to the Committee to Protect Journalists. (2017)
- John Conyers (D-MI) US Representative, resigned on December 5, 2017, after sources revealed he had paid a $27,000 settlement to one of his staffers who had accused him of sexual assault. Conyers resigned after congressional investigations were initiated against him. see 2017–18 United States political sexual scandals
- Fred W. Pagan (R) Staff to US Senator Thad Cochran (R-MS) pled guilty to possession of methamphetamine and GBL with intent to distribute and was sentenced to 30 months in prison. (2016)
- Joe Barton (R-TX) US Representative from the 6th District and member of the conservative Freedom Caucus, was found to have sent videos to several women on the internet of himself masturbating. A week later, Tea Party organizer Kelly Canon corroborated the stories. Barton announced he would not seek re-election. (2017)
- McCrae Dowless (R) Consultant for US Republican Candidate Mark Harris for NC's 9th US Congressional District. Dowless was arrested and charged with multiple counts of illegal ballot handling and conspiracy in both the 2016 and 2018 elections. He was convicted of defrauding the government and sentenced to 6 months in prison and fined. (2018)

=== Judicial branch ===
- Alex Kozinski (R) US Judge in the Ninth Circuit Court of Appeals appointed by Republican Ronald Reagan, retired following allegations of sexual misconduct from several women, including former clerks. see 2017–18 United States political sexual scandals(2018)
- Patricia Head Minaldi (R) Senior Judge of the US District Court for the Western District of Louisiana appointed by President George W. Bush. After DUI arrest and several incidents in her courtroom, Minaldi took medical leave for severe alcoholism and then resigned. (2017)
- Jeffrey Siegmeister (R) States Attorney for the Third Judicial Circuit of Florida, was accused of conspiracy, extortion and bribery. He pled guilty to four counts and was sentenced to 40 months in prison. (2019)

== Joe Biden (D) administration (2021–2025) ==
=== Executive branch ===
- Sam Brinton (D) the Deputy Assistant Secretary for Spent Fuel and Waste Disposition in the Office of Nuclear Energy of the United States Department of Energy, was accused of stealing luggage from airports. They were fired. (2022)
- Eric Lander (D) Director of the Office of Science and Technology Policy (a cabinet level position), had multiple accusations by staff of insulting and embarrassing behavior. On February 7, 2022, he resigned.
- Tyler Joseph "TJ" Ducklo (D) Deputy Press Secretary, threatened to "destroy" a reporter if she published a story about his affair. He apologized and resigned.
- Alejandro Mayorkas (D) Secretary of Homeland Security was impeached in a 214–213 Republican led vote by the U.S. House of Representatives for refusing to comply with federal immigration laws. The Articles of Impeachment was sent to the U.S. Senate where it was accepted for consideration, but decided that neither charge was an example of high crimes and misdemeanors and dismissed them, leaving Mayorkas in office. See Impeachment of Alejandro Mayorkas.
- Kimberly Cheatle (D) Director of the United States Secret Service accepted ultimate responsibility for events during the attempted assassination of Donald Trump and resigned. (2024)

=== Legislative branch ===
- Jeff Fortenberry (R-NE) US Representative from Lincoln in the 1st District, was indicted for making false statements to the FBI about the source of $189,000 in campaign contributions from a Nigerian billionaire. He was found guilty, and resigned. (2021)
- Van Taylor (R-TX) US Representative, was accused of having a nine-month affair with Tania Joya the (Isis Bride) who had been married to a Commander of the Islamic State. Taylor allegedly bribed Joya $5,000 to keep quiet. When that was leaked, Taylor withdraw from his reelection campaign. (2022)
- Madison Cawthorn (R-NC) U.S. House of Representatives was accused by several women of sexually aggressive behavior, insider trading, appearing nude in women's lingerie, attending orgies and other behavior "not becoming of a congressman." He lost the next Republican nomination. (2022)
- Tom Reed (R-NY) US Representative, was accused of sexual harassment by a lobbyist for an incident at a bar. He apologized and announced his immediate resignation.
- George Santos (R-NY) U.S. Representative was expelled from the House on December 1, 2023 and then found guilty of wire fraud and identity theft, and sentenced to 87 months in prison. Pardoned by Donald Trump
- Nancy Marks (R) Campaign Treasurer for George Santos (R-NY) pled guilty to identity theft, wire fraud, false statements, and obstruction of the FEC. She was sentenced to 7 years. (2022)
- Jamaal Bowman (D-NY) U.S. Representative was accused of falsely pulling a fire alarm in a congressional building. Bowman plead guilty to a misdemeanor charge and was fined $1000 and censured. (2024)
- Bob Menendez (D-NJ) U.S. Senator, was convicted of 16 counts of bribery, fraud, and acting as a foreign agent and sentenced to 11 years. (2023)
- Steve Buyer (R-IN) was found guilty of insider trading involving a billion dollar merger between T-Mobile and Sprint, and illegal trades with Navigant. Buyer was sentenced to 22 months in prison and was ordered to forfeit more than $350,000 and fined. He was pardoned by Donald Trump.
- TJ Cox (D-CA) from the 21st district, pled guilty to fraud concerning re-election campaign funds and was sentenced to one year in prison with 3.5 million restitution.
- Matt Gaetz (R-FL) US Representative, withdrew his nomination for United States Attorney General and resigned the next day, before the United States House Committee on Ethics released a report that he had violated Florida State laws for drug use, prostitution, and rape, thus placing himself out of Ethics Committee jurisdiction.(2024)

=== Judicial branch ===
- Jeffrey Siegmeister (R) U.S. Attorney for the Third Judicial Circuit of Florida, was accused of conspiracy, extortion and bribery. He pled guilty to four counts. (2019)
- Joshua Kindred (R) Judge of U.S. District Court of Alaska, resigned after the Judicial Council of District Nine concluded he had engaged in misconduct by creating a hostile work environment, having an inappropriately sexualized relationship, and then lying about it. (2024)

== Donald Trump (R) Second administration (2025–Present) ==
=== Executive branch ===
- Donald Trump (R) President, Birthright citizenship in the United States. Four U.S. District Judges representing 22 states, have ruled Trump’s executive order stating that children of noncitizens are not “subject to the jurisdiction” of the United States and therefore not entitled to citizenship. The judges ruled it was “blatantly unconstitutional” and violated the Fourteenth Amendment.*John Bolton (R) U.S. National Security Advisor pled guilty to mishandling classified documents. (2026)
- Mike Waltz (R) U.S. National Security Advisor was removed from his post for having a group chat on a non secure device to discuss classified information, such as upcoming US strikes on Houthi militia units thus also revealing private data, passwords and journalists, such as the editor-in-chief of The Atlantic. Waltz resigned and was made Ambassador to the UN. (2025)
- Kimberly Guilfoyle (R) United States ambassador to Greece was asked to resign due to several allegations of ethical misconduct. (2026)
- Lori Chavez-DeRemer (R) U.S. Secretary of Labor was being investigated for misuse of travel, drinking on the job, an alleged affair with a security guard, frequent absences, three separate female civil rights complaints and creating a toxic workplace, when she resigned. (2026)
- Kristi Noem (R) U.S. Secretary of Homeland Security was fired by President Trump for her handling of U.S. Immigration and Customs Enforcement policies in Minnesota, secret contracts for an ad campaign, allegations of infidelity, mismanagement of staff, and feuding with other agencies, such as CBP and ICE.
- Corey Lewandowski (R) Senior Advisor to DHS Secretary Kristi Noem was ousted by Donald Trump in March 2026 following reports of an affair with Noem, his grabbing of a female reporter, workplace tensions and internal power struggles.
- Mike Banks head of the U.S. Border Patrol, resigned amid allegations of traveling to foreign countries for sex and bragging about it. Two previous investigations were shut down by former Homeland Security Secretary Kristi Noem. (2026)

=== Legislative branch ===
- Eric Swalwell (D-CA) resigned his seat in congress and dropped his bid for governor of California after several allegations of sexual misconduct were made, which he denies. (2026)
- Tony Gonzales (R-TX) confessed to an affair with a staffer who later killed herself. Under party pressure he resigned. (2026)
- Sheila Cherfilus-McCormick (D-FL) resigned her seat following the House Ethics Committee finding her guilty of 25 violations related to stolen FEMA relief funds. She has pleaded not guilty. (2026)

== See also ==
- List of American federal politicians convicted of crimes
- List of federal political sex scandals in the United States
- List of United States representatives expelled, censured, or reprimanded
- List of United States senators expelled or censured
- List of United States unincorporated territory officials convicted of federal corruption offenses
- List of American state and local politicians convicted of crimes
- List of 2000s American state and local politicians convicted of crimes
- List of 2010s American state and local politicians convicted of crimes
- List of 2020s American state and local politicians convicted of crimes

== Bibliography ==
- Grossman, Mark (2003). Political corruption in America: an encyclopedia of scandals, power, and greed. ABC-CLIO. ISBN 978-1-57607-060-4.
- C. Vann Woodward, ed. (1974). Responses of the Presidents to Charges of Misconduct: essays by historians on each administration from George Washington to Lyndon Johnson.
