= Sue Ellen Wooldridge =

American lawyer

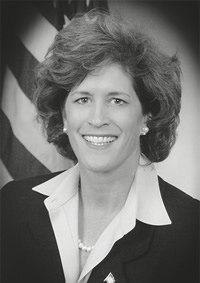

Assistant United States Attorney General for the Environment and Natural Resources
- In office November 2005 – January 8, 2007
- President: George W. Bush
- Preceded by: Tom Sansonetti
- Succeeded by: Ronald J. Tenpas

Personal details
- Born: Sue Ellen Wooldridge; February 15, 1961 (age 65) Carpinteria, California, U.S.
- Party: Republican
- Spouse: J. Steven Griles (m. 2007)
- Education: University of California, Davis (BA); Harvard University (JD)
- Profession: Lawyer

Sue Ellen Wooldridge (born February 15, 1961) is an American attorney and former government official. She was the United States Assistant Attorney General in charge of environment and natural resources, a division of the United States Department of Justice, from 2005 until her resignation in 2007. As such, she was the top environmental prosecutor in the country.

== Personal ==
Wooldridge grew up on a farm in Artois, California. She holds a bachelor's degree in political science and history from the University of California, Davis (1983). She graduated with a J.D. degree from Harvard Law School in 1987. She is admitted to practice law in the United States Supreme Court and in the state and federal courts of California.

She lived with J. Steven Griles, whom she began dating while he was one of her supervisors at the United States Department of the Interior, and they were married in March, 2007, "three days after Griles pleaded guilty to lying to Congress about his relationship with Jack Abramoff and a previous romantic partner."

== Career ==
Prior to her service with the Department of Justice, Wooldridge served as Solicitor for the United States Department of the Interior, that agency's highest ranking lawyer, after being appointed by President George W. Bush in a recess appointment. Prior to her employment in that capacity, she served as Counselor to J. Steven Griles, Deputy Secretary of the United States Department of the Interior; she also served as Deputy Chief of Staff and Counselor for Secretary of the Interior Gale Norton, serving in that position beginning on January 31, 2001.

Prior to her position with the Department of the Interior, Wooldridge worked as a lawyer in private practice in Sacramento, California, from 1987 to 1994; and again from 1999 to 2001; served as general counsel to the non-partisan California Fair Political Practices Commission in 2000; and served as a special assistant attorney general in the California Department of Justice.

== Controversies ==
In February 2007, a newspaper claimed in March 2006 that before Wooldridge resigned as assistant attorney general for Environment and Natural Resources Division (ENRD), she had purchased a $980,000 vacation home on Kiawah Island, South Carolina, with two other individuals: J. Steven Griles, a former deputy secretary of the U.S. Department of the Interior, her boyfriend at the time; and Don R. Duncan, vice president for federal and international affairs and a lobbyist for ConocoPhillips, a Houston based oil corporation.

Griles himself became an oil and gas lobbyist and subsequently pled guilty to obstruction of justice in the Jack Abramoff affair. The allegation was that Wooldridge acted improperly by approving several consent decrees in litigation between the government and ConocoPhillips, supposedly giving the company preferential treatment. Nine months after buying the home with Duncan and Griles, and just before stepping down, Wooldridge had approved the consent decrees, giving ConocoPhillips three more years to pay millions of dollars in fines for a Superfund toxic waste cleanup and the installation of pollution controls, which had been estimated to cost US$525 million, at nine of ConocoPhillips' refineries.

The claims received wide circulation in the media and in Congress.
