= Elizabeth Saewyc =

- Born: 20th century
- Education: University of Washington, University of Washington, University of Minnesota
- Scientific career
- Workplaces: University of British Columbia (2004–); University of Minnesota (1999–2004)
- Website: macisaacnursing.ubc.ca/our-people/elizabeth-saewyc

Elizabeth Saewyc is an American and Canadian academic who studies trauma, stigma and discrimination as they relate to health, focusing especially on queer youth. She is a professor and director of the MacIsaac School of Nursing at the University of British Columbia in Vancouver, Canada. She is the executive director of the Stigma and Resilience Among Vulnerable Youth Centre (SARAVYC) at UBC and research director of the McCreary Centre Society.

== Academic career ==
Saewyc was born in Minneapolis, Minnesota. She obtained a Bachelor of Science in Nursing from the University of Minnesota in 1996. She then completed a Master of Nursing at the University of Washington in 1998 and a PhD in Nursing Science at UW in 1999. After finishing at UW, she worked as an assistant professor in the School of Nursing at the University of Minnesota, until she joined the School of Nursing at the University of British Columbia as an associate professor in 2004. In the same year, she became the research director of the McCreary Centre Society, a title she still holds. In 2006, Saewyc became executive director of the Stigma and Resilience Among Vulnerable Youth Centre (SARAVYC) at UBC. She is a fellow in the Society for Adolescent Health and Medicine (2011), the Canadian Academy of Health Sciences (2013), the American Academy of Nursing (2016) as well as the Canadian Academy of Nursing (2020).

Her research has focused on public health and health equity for marginalized youth, especially queer youth, and the impacts of trauma and discrimination. She was appointed director of the UBC School of Nursing in July 2017. Through SARAVYC, she has made public comments based on the organization's research, such as speaking in support of British Columbia's SOGI (sexual orientation and gender identity) educational resource policies. She was reappointed for a second five-year term as the director of UBC's School of Nursing in July 2022.

== Selected works ==
- A meta-analysis of disparities in childhood sexual abuse, parental physical abuse, and peer victimization among sexual minority and sexual nonminority individuals. M. S. Friedman, M. P. Marshal, T. E. Guadamuz, C. Wei, C. F. Wong, E. M. Saewyc, et al. American journal of public health, 2011 101 (8), 1481–1494.
- Research on adolescent sexual orientation: Development, health disparities, stigma, and resilience. E. M. Saewyc, Journal of research on adolescence, 2011 21 (1), 256–272.
- Mental health disparities among Canadian transgender youth. J.F. Veale, R.J. Watson, T. Peter, E.M. Saewyc, Journal of Adolescent Health, 2017 60 (1), 44–49.
- Depression and suicide ideation among students accessing campus health care. S. Mackenzie, J.R. Wiegel, M. Mundt, D. Brown, E. Saewyc, E. Heiligenstein, et al. American journal of orthopsychiatry. 2011 81 (1), 101.
- Measuring sexual orientation in adolescent health surveys: Evaluation of eight school-based surveys. E.M. Saewyc, G.R. Bauer, C.L. Skay, L.H. Bearinger, M.D. Resnick, E. Reis, et al. Journal of Adolescent Health 2004 35 (4), 345.
- Hazards of stigma: The sexual and physical abuse of gay, lesbian, and bisexual adolescents in the United States and Canada. E.M. Saewyc, C.L. Skay, S.L. Pettingell. Child welfare. 2006, 195–213.
- Safe schools policy for LGBTQ students and commentaries. S. T. Russell, S. Horn, J. Kosciw, E. Saewyc. Social policy report 2010 24 (4), 1–25.

== Awards ==
- Robert H. Durant Award for Statistical Rigor and Innovation in Adolescent Health Research (2019)
- International Nursing Research Hall of Fame, Sigma Theta Tau International Honour Society (2019)
- Distinguished Alumni Humanitarian Award, University of Minnesota (2021)
- Distinguished University Scholar, University of British Columbia (2021)
