= Timothy Goeglein =

Former Deputy Director of the White House Office of Public Liaison (born 1964)

Deputy Director of the White House Office of the Public Liaison
- In office December 1, 2001 – February 28, 2008
- President: George W. Bush

Special Assistant to the President
- In office December 1, 2001 – September 15, 2008
- President: George W. Bush

Personal details
- Born: Timothy Geoglein; January 6, 1964 (age 62) Fort Wayne, Indiana U.S.
- Party: Republican
- Education: Indiana University Bloomington (BA)

Timothy Goeglein (pronounced Ghegline) (born January 6, 1964) was special assistant to U.S. President George W. Bush and Deputy Director of the White House Office of Public Liaison from 2001 to 2008. In January 2009, Goeglein became the Vice President of External and Government Relations for the Christian Organization Focus on the Family.

== Early years and education ==
Goeglein was born and grew up in Fort Wayne, Indiana. His family had few strong political commitments, and attended a liberal Lutheran church. His father was a painting contractor and his mother was a housewife. His maternal grandfather came as an immigrant from Macedonia to Ellis Island in 1916, when he was sixteen years old. At the age of 12, Geoglein became a host of WANE-TV’s "News for Little People"; as a sophomore at Paul Harding High School in Fort Wayne, he became a producer of WOWO radio’s "Mikeside," a Sunday-evening mix of student-produced newscasts and interviews.

Goeglein attended Indiana University Bloomington, majoring in journalism and political science. Goeglein was the Richard Gray scholar in his senior year, graduating from Indiana University's Ernie Pyle School of Journalism in 1986.

== Post-college work ==
Goeglein's first year after college was spent in broadcast media. He was the executive news producer at WKJG-NBC TV, Fort Wayne. In 1985, he interned for Indiana Republican Senator and then-future Vice President Dan Quayle. In 1986, Goeglein interned for Rep. Dan Coats. When Quayle became vice president, Coats was appointed to Quayle's U.S. Senate seat. Goeglein was named Coats' deputy press secretary, and later became press secretary and communications manager.

Goeglein became a spokesman for presidential candidate Gary Bauer, a conservative Republican, in early 1999. After Bauer dropped out of the race in February 2000, Goeglein was recruited for the George W. Bush presidential campaign; he and his wife and their two young sons moved to Austin, Texas in 2000 for that purpose.

== White House years ==
Beginning in 2001, Goeglein was named a special assistant to President George W. Bush at the White House, and was the deputy director of the White House Office of Public Liaison from 2001 to 2008. Public Liaison was a department under Deputy Chief of Staff Karl Rove. In December 2004, the Washington Post summarized Goeglein's job as "to make sure conservatives are happy, in the loop and getting their best ideas before the president and turned into laws." Writing in the New York Times, reporter David D. Kirkpatrick described him as "Mr. Rove's legman on the right". Edwin Feulner, president of The Heritage Foundation, said in June 2004 that he and Goeglein saw each other two or three times a week, and "If I have a message I want to get to Rove or the administration, I will scribble out a note to Tim, and within 24 hours I will get a response back. For lots of things, he is sort of one-stop shopping for a point of access to the administration."

During his seven years as Public Liaison, Goeglein helped establish the White House Office of Faith-Based and Community Initiatives, and the President's Emergency Plan for AIDS Relief. A White House statement said that he also "played an important role in the confirmation of Supreme Court Justices Samuel Alito and John G. Roberts." Goeglein represented the Bush administration at the funeral services for Reverend Jerry Falwell in May 2007, stating that Falwell was a "great friend of this administration" and "a force of nature."

=== Resignation ===
Goeglein wrote unpaid guest columns that appeared on the editorial page of the Fort Wayne News-Sentinel. In late February 2008, journalist Nancy Nall Derringer noticed a 2008 column by Goeglein that included the name "Eugene Rosenstock-Hussey". Because "this name was so goofy, just for the hell of it, I Googled it". She found the piece to be almost word-for-word identical to a 1998 piece by Jeffrey Hart in the Dartmouth Review.

On February 28, 2008, Derringer notified an editor of the News-Sentinel, and wrote about Goeglein's plagiarism the next morning on her website. Readers of the website and staffers at the News-Sentinel found that at least 20 of the 38 pieces written by Goeglein between 2000 and 2008 had instances of plagiarism. By mid-afternoon of February 29, 2008, CNN reported the story. The White House issued a press release later that afternoon stating that President Bush had accepted Goeglein's resignation, that he had long appreciated Goeglein's service, and that Goeglein was a "good person who is committed to his country."

Goeglein admitted that portions of the 2008 column were used from another source without attribution. He apologized to the editors of The News-Sentinel and also said there might be other columns that contained plagiarized material. As of March 3, the paper had found a total of 27 columns with plagiarism, the earliest in 1995.

=== Further interactions with President Bush ===
In a book published in 2011, Man in the Middle: An Inside Account of Faith and Politics in the George W. Bush Era, Goeglein said that he met with President Bush several days after his resignation, a meeting where Bush said he forgave Goeglein, and the two prayed together. Goeglein's book says that Bush invited him back to the White House numerous times after his resignation, including a meeting with Goeglein's family the week after the act of forgiveness. "The thing that leaders of the free world don't often do, probably, is ask aides who have just embarrassed them and brought shame upon the White House, they don't typically invite them to the Oval Office," he said in a 2011 interview with CNN. Goeglein attended Bush's farewell at Andrews Air Force Base in January 2009.

== Post-White House ==
In January 2009, Goeglein became the Vice President of External and Government Relations for Focus on the Family. The Colorado-based organization said Goeglein will be its "eyes and ears in Washington" as it defends issues such as rejecting same-sex marriage and banning abortion.

On June 10, 2009, Goeglein said this about his former boss: "George W. Bush was the instrument in God’s hand" who, upon being told of the September 11 attacks, "immediately...knew that this was war and that we were being attacked existentially by radical Islam." Goeglein went on to say that George W. Bush "is a great thinker" and that "with the benefit of time and space. . . historians will look back at those remarkable, incredibly eventful eight years, and say, you know, he made the right decisions".

In July 2019, Goeglein wrote a second book American Restoration: How Faith, Family, and Personal Sacrifice Can Heal Our Nation. The book's narrative focuses on 15 cultural areas that he argues would restore United States to its Judeo-Christian foundation and constitutional principles.
