= J. Steven Griles =

American lobbyist (born 1947)

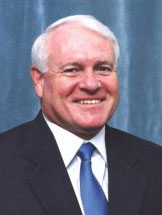
- Official portrait, 2001

3rd United States Deputy Secretary of the Interior
- In office July 12, 2001 – December 7, 2004
- President: George W. Bush
- Preceded by: David J. Hayes
- Succeeded by: Lynn Scarlett

Personal details
- Born: December 13, 1947 (age 78) Clover, Virginia, U.S.
- Education: University of Richmond (BA)

James Steven Griles (born December 13, 1947) is an American former government official and lobbyist who served as the 3rd United States Deputy Secretary of the Interior from July 12, 2001 until his resignation on December 7, 2004. Griles held the second-ranking position at the United States Department of the Interior, ranking below only the Secretary of the Interior, at the time Gale Norton.

Griles served as a Department of the Interior representative on Vice President Dick Cheney's energy task force. In 2007, he pleaded guilty to felony obstruction of justice in the Senate investigation of the Abramoff scandal, the highest-ranking Bush administration official to do so. He was sentenced to a fine and ten months' imprisonment.

== Early life and education ==
Born in Clover, Virginia, Griles earned his bachelor's degree from the University of Richmond in 1970.

== Career ==
Griles was formerly a principal with National Environmental Strategies, Inc. (NES), a public affairs firm that provided advice and lobbying services to companies, trade associations and others regarding policy, regulatory, environmental and energy issues at the Federal and State government level. Prior to joining NES, he was Senior Vice President for Public, Environmental and Marketing Activities for the United Company. Located in Bristol, Virginia, the United Company was a diversified natural resources company with select diversification in non-energy areas, with operations in coal, oil and gas, cogeneration, gold mining, manufacturing, real estate, hotels, and golf operations with both domestic and foreign interests.

Griles worked in the Reagan administration as deputy director of the Office of Surface Mining, Department of the Interior from 1981 to 1983, and as assistant secretary and deputy assistant secretary of the Interior for Lands and Minerals Management (1983–1989).

=== Department of Interior ===
Griles was confirmed as Deputy to Interior Secretary Gale Norton. Second in rank only to Norton, Griles effectively was Interior's chief operating officer and its top representative on Vice President Dick Cheney's energy task force.

Upon taking the job of Deputy Secretary, Griles was allowed to receive payments totaling more than $1 million from 2001 to 2005 as part of a buyout by NES while collecting his $150,000 annual federal salary. This was allowed only under conditions approved by the Office of Government Ethics and the Senate, and Griles signed a written agreement stating he would recuse himself from "any particular matter involving specific parties in which any of [his] former clients is or represents a party."

However, a Freedom of Information Act request in September 2002 turned up evidence that Griles had met with former clients in the fossil fuel industries, despite the agreement. Griles resigned after an 18-month investigation by the Department's Inspector General concluded that Griles indeed had contact with former NES clients in violation of the agreement, although the report did not accuse Griles of violating any laws or federal ethics rules.

David Hirsch, a director for Friends of the Earth, said of Griles: "he spent four years working for his former clients at the Department of Interior. It didn't seem to matter how many problems came out, he just kept going. He's the Energizer Bunny of conflict of interest."

==== Abramoff scandal ====
Griles was also asked to testify before the Senate Indian Affairs Committee in the 2005 investigation of the Abramoff scandal. Jack Abramoff's private emails indicated that Griles had pledged to use his authority to block a casino which Abramoff was lobbying against. Abramoff also indicated that he was interested in hiring Griles.

Furthermore, Griles was involved with donations made to the Council of Republicans for Environmental Advocacy, run by his then-girlfriend, Italia Federici. Donations were made to CREA by both Abramoff's tribal clients and by energy-sector companies with connections to Griles.

Upon leaving office, Griles joined with two other political veterans, former White House national energy policy director Andrew Lundquist and former House member George Nethercutt, to form the political lobbying firm of Lundquist, Nethercutt & Griles, LLC. In his first two years with the firm, it made $1.3 million in lobbying fees. The following year, it was $1.6 million. Griles remarked, "If you’re honest and represent people fairly, you can succeed."

On January 10, 2007, the United States Department of Justice notified Griles that charges would be brought against him for making false statements in his 2005 testimony. On that date Griles resigned from Lundquist, Nethercutt & Griles. He pleaded guilty to obstruction of justice charges on March 23, 2007. On June 8, 2007, Federici pleaded guilty to tax evasion and obstruction of justice. Griles was sentenced to a $30,000 fine and ten months' imprisonment, with some harsh words from Judge Ellen Huvelle, who doubled his prison sentence, telling the former second-ranking Interior Department official: "Even now, you continue to minimize and try to excuse your conduct."

== See also ==
- Wise Use Movement
- Sue Ellen Wooldridge
