= Council of Republicans for Environmental Advocacy =

Republican environmental organization

Council of Republicans for Environmental Advocacy (CREA) was a Republican environmental organization founded in 1998 by Gale Norton, who in 2001 became George W. Bush's U.S. Secretary of the Interior. CREA "evolved from a group" Italia Federici and Norton founded in 1997 "with tax activist Grover Norquist to push for Republican environmental goals." The organization's steering committee included lobbyists for the petroleum, mining, and auto manufacturing industries. The organization's president, Italia Federici, pleaded guilty in 2007 to obstructing the U.S. Senate investigation into the Jack Abramoff Indian lobbying scandal and for siphoning CREA funds for personal use. Abramoff donated more than $400,000 to her charity, after which time she began using her connections with J. Steven Griles, to influence him to make decisions beneficial to Abramoff's tribal benefactors. Later in 2007, CREA's vice president, Jared Carpenter, pleaded guilty of tax evasion for also diverting CREA funds for personal use.

== History ==
In a profile of Norton, the Natural Resources Defense Council wrote of CREA that "true pro-environment Republicans, the Republicans for Environmental Protection, have called her group a 'green scam'."

In August 2004, a coalition of environmental groups released a report based on documents obtained under the Freedom of Information Act revealing "that a Bush administration policy directive has eliminated federal Clean Water Act protections for streams, wetlands, lakes and rivers across the nation."

At the heart of the report were 15 case studies documenting "how the administration's January 2003 policy directive has prompted federal regulators to avoid protecting ponds, lakes, rivers, and entire watersheds from toxic pollution."

CREA fired off a media release denouncing the report that the groups "will" release before it had even read the report. (Presumably CREA was responding to the details contained in a media advisory). CREA president Italia Federici claimed that if the groups were detailing 15 case studies, by implication "these organizations agreed with approximately 99,985 wetlands decisions made by the Corps -- a whopping 99.99%."

As of December 2010 the CREA website had been taken down, and there is no longer evidence that the organization continues to exist.

== Funding ==
In a profile of Norton, the Natural Resource Defense Council referred to CREA as being "a group sponsored by mining, chemical and chlorine industries."

Beginning early in 2001, Indian tribes gave more than $250,000 to CREA. The donations were made at the recommendation of lobbyist Jack Abramoff; the tribes were his clients. The suggestion for donations had come from staffers of Representative Tom DeLay, who were advising Abramoff on how to gain influence with Norton. On September 24, 2001, at a private fundraising dinner arranged by CREA, Coushatta tribal chairman Lovelin Poncho and Abramoff sat at Norton's table, while tribal attorney Kathy Van Hoof sat at another table with Norton's top deputy, Steven Griles. The Gun Lake tribe of Pottawatomi, one of the rivals of Abramoff's tribal clients, has said that it believed Abramoff's lobbying stalled Interior's approval of its casino by at least 14 months.

== Personnel ==
- Italia Federici President
- Jared Carpenter, Vice President

=== Honorary Board ===
The honorary board of CREA consisted of Gaylon Layfield and Jimmy Wheat of The Chesapeake Bay Foundation, Doug Wheeler of Hogan and Hartson LLP and former secretary of the California Resources Agency, Linda Porter of the Land Trust of Virginia, Gary Baise of Kilpatrick Stockton LLP and an early director of the EPA's Office of Legislation, and biotech advisor George Xixis of Nutter McClennen & Fish.

== Contact information ==
2117 L Street, NW • Number 303
Washington, DC 20037
Phone: 202.625.7110

(A late July 2004 media release listed the organization's address as 2100 M Street, NW • Number 303 Washington, DC 20037).
