= Italia Federici =

Italia Federici (born August 12, 1969), the former president of the Council of Republicans for Environmental Advocacy (CREA), a greenscam organization. Federici was also a political aide to Secretary of the Interior and CREA co-founder Gale Norton. Federici pleaded guilty in June 2007 to tax evasion and obstructing the United States Senate investigation into the Jack Abramoff Indian lobbying scandal and was sentenced to four years probation.

== Council of Republicans for Environmental Advocacy ==
Federici founded CREA with Norton and Americans for Tax Reform president Grover Norquist, a college friend of Abramoff, in 1997 with money Federici inherited; The organization was also funded by, and supported the goals of, mining and other industries.

== Abramoff involvement ==
Federici introduced Jack Abramoff to Deputy Secretary of the Interior J. Steven Griles in March 2001, just before Griles started at the Department of the Interior. Abramoff donated more than $400,000 to CREA, after which time she allegedly began using her connections with Griles to influence him to make decisions beneficial to Abramoff's tribal benefactors.

In emails, Abramoff claimed that "she is critical" to his work with the Department of Interior, especially with regards to preventing the Jena Band of Choctaws Indian Tribe from creating a casino, that would take money away from one of Abramoff's "core tribes". A February 18, 2003, email from Abramoff to Federici said "...This will be a PR disaster as you can imagine, especially if for some reason Interior agrees to approve this deal. McCrery and Vitter (the other R's in the delegation) are furious beyond belief. This is going to get really ugly. Please let Steve know about this. Thanks so much Italia!". The email referred to Griles, who is reported to have been romantically connected to Federici.

Federici also pleaded guilty to failure to file tax returns from 2001 - 2003; Furthermore, she did not pay income tax from 2001 through 2003.

In December 2007, Federici was sentenced to four years probation, and $77,243 in restitution of back taxes.
