= Lists of American state and local politicians convicted of crimes =

This is a list of lists of American politicians at the state and local levels who have been convicted of felony crimes committed while in office. The lists are broken by decades.

- List of 1850s American state and local politicians convicted of crimes
- List of 1870s American state and local politicians convicted of crimes
- List of 1880s American state and local politicians convicted of crimes
- List of 1890s American state and local politicians convicted of crimes
- List of 1900s American state and local politicians convicted of crimes
- List of 1910s American state and local politicians convicted of crimes
- List of 1920s American state and local politicians convicted of crimes
- List of 1930s American state and local politicians convicted of crimes
- List of 1940s American state and local politicians convicted of crimes
- List of 1950s American state and local politicians convicted of crimes
- List of 1960s American state and local politicians convicted of crimes
- List of 1970s American state and local politicians convicted of crimes
- List of 1980s American state and local politicians convicted of crimes
- List of 1990s American state and local politicians convicted of crimes
- List of 2000s American state and local politicians convicted of crimes
- List of 2010s American state and local politicians convicted of crimes
- List of 2020s American state and local politicians convicted of crimes

== See also ==
- List of United States state officials convicted of federal corruption offenses
