= List of 1850s American state and local politicians convicted of crimes =

This list includes American politicians at the state and local levels who have been convicted of felony crimes committed while in office by decade; this list encompasses the 1850s.

At the bottom of the article are links to related articles which deal with politicians who are involved in federal scandals (political and sexual), as well as differentiating among federal, state and local convictions. Also excluded are crimes which occur outside the politician's tenure in office unless they specifically stem from acts during his time of service.

Entries are arranged by date, from most current to less recent, and by state.

== Illinois ==
- Governor of Illinois Joel Aldrich Matteson (D), was found to have redeemed Michigan and Illinois Canal scrip, which had already been redeemed. He was found guilty and forced to repay $238K. (1859)

== See also ==
- List of American state and local politicians convicted of crimes
- List of federal political scandals in the United States
- List of federal political sex scandals in the United States

Federal politicians:

- List of American federal politicians convicted of crimes
- List of United States representatives expelled, censured, or reprimanded
- List of United States senators expelled or censured
