= List of 1910s American state and local politicians convicted of crimes =

This list includes American politicians at the state and local levels who have been convicted of felony crimes committed while in office by decade; this list encompasses the 1910s.

At the bottom of the article are links to related articles which deal with politicians who are involved in federal scandals (political and sexual), as well as differentiating among federal, state and local convictions. Also excluded are crimes which occur outside the politician's tenure in office unless they specifically stem from acts during his time of service.

Entries are arranged by date, from most current to less recent, and by state.

== Arkansas ==
- State Senator Samuel C. Sims (D) was paid a bribe of $900 about legislation to regulate trading stamps and coupons. He was arrested, charged with bribery and convicted, and then expelled from the Senate. (1917)
- State Senator Ivison C. Burgess (R) introduced legislation to regulate trading stamps and coupons and then accepted a bribe of $2,000 from trading-stamp interests. Guilty of bribery, then expelled from the Senate. (1917)

== California ==
- State Senator Marshall Black, (R) was convicted for embezzlement of funds (1918)

== Illinois ==
=== Local ===
- Mayor of Rock Island, Harry M. Schriver (R) was convicted of vice protection and conspiracy. (1923)

== Indiana ==
- Mayor of Muncie, Indiana Rollin H. Bunch (D) convicted of mail fraud. (1917)

== Massachusetts ==
- Lawrence, Massachusetts Mayor William P. White (R) was found guilty of bribery. (1910)
- State Representative Harry C. Foster (R) was found guilty of conduct unbecoming a representative for collecting money for pending legislation (1916)

== New Hampshire ==
- State Representative Clifford L. Snow (R) found guilty of selling his votes to other legislators(1913)

== Oklahoma ==
- State Insurance Commissioner Perry A. Ballard (D) was found guilty of moral turpitude and corruption. (1913)
- State Printer Giles W. Farris (D) was impeached and removed from office by the Oklahoma Legislature. (1913)

=== Local ===
- Mayor of Haskell, Oklahoma J. D. Weaver, convicted of selling whisky (1910)
- Mayor of Tulsa Frank M. Wooden (D), was impeached and convicted of not enforcing the law.(1916)

== Pennsylvania ==
- Auditor General of Pennsylvania William Preston Snyder (R) was convicted of conspiracy to defraud and was given a sentence of two years in jail. (1909)
- State Superintendent of Public Grounds and Buildings James M. Shumaker (R) was convicted of conspiracy to defraud. Sentenced to two years in prison. (1908)

== Vermont ==
- Horace F. Graham (R) State Auditor, had just been elected governor, when he was accused of having embezzled $25,000. At trial, he was found guilty and sentenced to prison. A new governor was elected, Republican Percival W. Clement. Though Graham still denied the crime, he repaid the missing funds. He was then pardoned by Governor Clement. (1917)

== Wisconsin ==
- State Assemblyman Edmund J. Labuwi (R) was convicted of obtaining money under false pretenses. (1916)

== See also ==
- List of federal political scandals in the United States
- List of federal political sex scandals in the United States

Federal politicians:

- List of American federal politicians convicted of crimes
- List of United States representatives expelled, censured, or reprimanded
- List of United States senators expelled or censured
