= List of 1870s American state and local politicians convicted of crimes =

This list includes American politicians at the state and local levels who have been convicted of felony crimes committed while in office by decade; this list encompasses the 1870s.

At the bottom of the article are links to related articles which deal with politicians who are involved in federal scandals (political and sexual), as well as differentiating among federal, state and local convictions. Also excluded are crimes which occur outside the politician's tenure in office unless they specifically stem from acts during his time of service.

Entries are arranged by date, from most current to less recent, and by state.

== Mississippi ==
- Lieutenant Governor Alexander K. Davis (R) was found guilty of accepting a bribe for aid in obtaining a pardon. (1876)

== Nebraska ==
- Governor David C. Butler (R) was found guilty of using $16,000 from the sale of public lands for his own private use. He was then impeached and removed from office. (1871)

== North Carolina ==
- Governor William Woods Holden (R) was convicted of "unlawful" arrests and recruitment of troops to quell the activities of the Ku Klux Klan in what became known as the Kirk-Holden war. Impeached, found guilty and removed from office. (1870)

== South Carolina ==
- State Treasurer Francis Lewis Cardozo (R) was convicted of fraud, and spent seven months in prison. (1876)

== See also ==
- List of federal political scandals in the United States
- List of federal political sex scandals in the United States

Federal politicians:

- List of American federal politicians convicted of crimes
- List of United States representatives expelled, censured, or reprimanded
- List of United States senators expelled or censured
