= List of 1940s American state and local politicians convicted of crimes =

This list includes American politicians at the state and local levels who have been convicted of felony crimes committed while in office by decade; this list encompasses the 1940s.

At the bottom of the article are links to related articles which deal with politicians who are involved in federal scandals (political and sexual), as well as differentiating among federal, state and local convictions. Also excluded are crimes which occur outside the politician's tenure in office unless they specifically stem from acts during his time of service.

Entries are arranged by date, from most current to less recent, and by state.

== Massachusetts ==
=== Local ===
- Mayor of Lowell George T. Ashe (D) was convicted by a jury on charges of conspiracy involving city purchases. (1942) He was sentenced to a year in prison.
- Sheriff of Suffolk County John F. Dowd (D) pleaded guilty to charges of conspiracy and soliciting and accepting gratuities. He was sentenced to two concurrent sentences of six to eight years in prison. (1941)
- Marlborough, Massachusetts city solicitor John J. Ginnetti pled guilty to bribery for selling two jobs in the Marlborough Fire Department. Mayor Louis Ingalls, who was indicted alongside Ginnetti, committed suicide before the trial began. Ginnetti was sentenced to six months in jail and resigned from the bar. (1940)

== Michigan ==
- State Representative Carl F. DeLano (R) was convicted of accepting bribes from naturopathic physicians, sentenced to three to five years in prison (1945)
- State Senator William C. Birk (R) was convicted of accepting a bribe and sentenced to four years in prison. (1945)
- State Senator Jerry T. Logie (R) was tried, convicted, and sentenced to 3–5 years in prison for bribery. (1944)
- State Representative William Green (R) indicted on bribery charges, tried in 1945 and convicted; sentenced to three to five years in prison (1945)
- State Representative Warren Green Hooper (R) pleaded guilty to taking bribes and was given immunity from prosecution in return for turning state's evidence. Four days later he was shot and killed. (1945)

== New Jersey ==
=== Local ===
- Atlantic County Treasurer Enoch L. Johnson "Nucky" (R) was involved in racketeering, gambling, prostitution and bootlegging. He was arrested for failure to file income taxes. He was found guilty and sentenced to 10 years. (1941)

== New York ==
- Assemblyman Lawrence J. Murray, Jr. (D) was charged with embezzling over some time a total amount of $49,102 from the accounts of a mentally incompetent client which he subsequently lost betting on horses. On April 4, 1940, he was convicted of theft, and the next day sentenced to 5 to 10 years in prison.
- Former State Senator Ellwood M. Rabenold (D) convicted of misappropriation of bank funds, forgery, and conspiracy (1940)

== See also ==
- List of federal political scandals in the United States
- List of federal political sex scandals in the United States

Federal politicians:

- List of American federal politicians convicted of crimes
- List of United States representatives expelled, censured, or reprimanded
- List of United States senators expelled or censured
