= List of 1950s American state and local politicians convicted of crimes =

This list includes American politicians at the state and local levels who have been convicted of felony crimes committed while in office by decade; this list encompasses the 1950s.

At the bottom of the article are links to related articles which deal with politicians who are involved in federal scandals (political and sexual), as well as differentiating among federal, state and local convictions. Also excluded are crimes which occur outside the politician's tenure in office unless they specifically stem from acts during his time of service.

Entries are arranged by date, from most current to less recent, and by state.

== Connecticut ==
- State Representative Anna Mae Pallanck (R) was convicted of aggravated assault. She was given a suspended sentence of 10 days in jail and ordered to pay a fine of $300. (1957)

== Illinois ==
- State Auditor Orville Hodge (R) embezzled more than $6 million and was indicted on 54 counts including conspiracy, forgery and embezzling. He was sentenced to 12 to 15 years in prison. (1956)

== Maine ==
- State Senator Earle Albee (R), was found guilty of accepting money under false pretenses for working to have a drunk driving charge dismissed. He was sentenced to prison and an appeal was dismissed. (1957)

== Oklahoma ==
=== Local ===
- Muskogee county Sheriff Eddie J Brigs (?) , convicted of liquor conspiracy. (1950)

== Texas ==
- Texas Land Commissioner Bascom Giles (D) convicted of fraud and bribery and served three years of a six-year prison term.

== See also ==
- List of federal political scandals in the United States
- List of federal political sex scandals in the United States

Federal politicians:

- List of American federal politicians convicted of crimes
- List of United States representatives expelled, censured, or reprimanded
- List of United States senators expelled or censured
