= List of 1970s American state and local politicians convicted of crimes =

This list includes American politicians at the state and local levels who have been convicted of felony crimes committed while in office by decade; this list encompasses the 1970s.

At the bottom of the article are links to related articles which deal with politicians who are involved in federal scandals (political and sexual), as well as differentiating among federal, state and local convictions. Also excluded are crimes which occur outside the politician's tenure in office unless they specifically stem from acts during his time of service.

Entries are arranged by date, from most current to less recent, and by state.

== Alabama ==
- State Treasurer Melba Till Allen (D) was convicted of using her office to obtain bank loans to build a theme park and of failing to make full disclosure of her personal finances. She was sentenced to six years in jail and three-and-a-half years of probation. (1978)

== Arkansas ==
- State Senator Guy H. Jones (D) convicted of tax evasion in 1973, he was expelled from the senate in 1974.

== Illinois ==
- State Representative Walter C. McAvoy (R) convicted of taking a bribe. (1978)
- The Illinois concrete industry was investigated for bribery and six politicians were found guilty. (1976)
  1. State Rep. Pete Pappas (R), the chief conspirator who turned government informant and pleaded guilty; got probation.
  2. State Rep. Louis F, Capuzi (R) – (Chicago) guilty
  3. State Rep, Robert Craig (D), guilty, 3-year sentence, $5,000 fine.
  4. State Sen. Kenneth W. Course (D), guilty, 3-year sentence, $5,000 fine.
  5. State Rep. Frank P. (Pat) North (R), guilty, 3-year sentence, $5,000 fine.
  6. State Sen. Jack E. Walker (R), guilty, 3-year sentence, $5,000 fine.
  7. State Sen. Donald D. Carpentier (R), guilty, 3-year sentence, $5,000 fine.
- State Representative John Wall (R) was convicted of conspiracy to extort money from employees of Crown Personnel, Inc., connected with the labor department's program to find jobs for Vietnam veterans through private employment agencies. (1971)
- Governor Otto Kerner, Jr. (D) After serving two terms, Kerner was appointed to the Seventh District Court. While a judge, he was charged with bribery, conspiracy, perjury and related charges for actions as Governor. He was convicted on 17 counts, 13 of which were overturned on appeal. He resigned as a judge after being sentenced to three years in federal prison and a $50,000 fine. (1973)
- Secretary of State Edward Barrett (D) was convicted of bribery, mail fraud, and income tax evasion. (1973)

=== Local ===
- Alderman of Chicago Edward Scholl (D) convicted of bribery. (1975)
- Alderman of Chicago Donald Swinarski (D) convicted of bribery. (1975)
- Alderman of Chicago Paul Wigoda (D) convicted of bribery. (1974)
- Alderman of Chicago Thomas Keane (D) convicted of fraud. (1974)
- Alderman of Chicago Frank Kuta (D) convicted of bribery. (1974)
- Alderman of Chicago Joseph Potempa (D) convicted of bribery. (1973)
- Alderman of Chicago Casimir Staszcuk (D) convicted of bribery. (1973)
- Alderman of Chicago Joseph Jambrone (D) convicted of bribery. (1973)
- Alderman of Chicago Fred Hubbard (D) convicted of embezzlement. (1972)

== Louisiana ==
- Attorney General Jack P. F. Gremillion (D) was sentenced to three years in prison for perjury for covering up his dealings with a failed savings and loan. (1972)

== Maryland ==
- State Representative George Santoni (D) was convicted of extortion and served 43 months in prison. (1977)
- Governor Marvin Mandel (D) was convicted of mail fraud and racketeering. (1977) He served nineteen months of his sentence in a federal prison before being pardoned by President Ronald Reagan. On November 12, 1987, Judge Frederic N. Smalkin overturned Mandel's conviction.
- Anne Arundel County Executive Joseph Alton Jr. (R) pleaded guilty to charges of conspiracy to commit extortion. He served seven months of an eighteen-month sentence in Allenwood Federal Correctional Complex. (1974)

== Massachusetts ==
- State Senator George Rogers (D) was convicted of conspiracy to steal and bribe. He was sentenced to two years in prison and fined $5,000. (1978)
- State Senators Joseph DiCarlo (D) and Ronald MacKenzie (R) were convicted of violating the Hobbs Act, which forbids extortion by public officials, and the Travel Act, which forbids crossing state lines for the purpose of extortion. They were sentenced to one year in prison and fined $5,000. (1977)
- State Representative David J. O'Connor (D) was convicted of willful failure to file Federal income tax returns. He was sentenced five months in jail and fined $10,000. (1970)

== Michigan ==
- State Representative Monte Geralds (D) was expelled from the State House of Representatives, after he was convicted of embezzling $24,000 from a client. (1978)

== New Jersey ==
- State Assemblyman Arnold D'Ambrosa (D) sentenced to nine months in jail after admitting to charges of embezzlement, bribery, perjury and official misconduct. (1976)
- State Senator Jerome Epstein (R) was convicted of stealing $4 million worth of oil between 1969 and 1975 while he was in office. He was sentenced to nine years in prison (1975)
- Secretary of the Treasury Joseph H. McCrane Jr. (R) was convicted of four counts of preparing false and fraudulent tax returns to hide political donations (1974)
- State Senator James Turner (R) was convicted on charges of planting drugs in the home of his Democratic opponent, Assemblyman Kenneth Gewertz in an attempt to frame and ruin him. Senator Turner got five years in prison. (1974)
- Secretary of State Robert J. Burkhardt (D) convicted of accepting $30,000 in bribes to 'fix' a bridge construction contract in 1964. He was given a suspended sentence and three years' probation. (1972)
- Secretary of State Paul J. Sherwin (D) was convicted of trying to fix a $600,000 state highway contract for a contractor who then kicked back $10,000 to Republican fund-raisers (1971)
- State Assemblyman Peter Moraites (R) pleaded guilty to two misdemeanor counts of fraud and was given a 16-month sentence. (1970)

=== Local ===
- Mayor of Jersey City, Thomas J. Whelan (D) was indicted as a member of the "Hudson County Eight", and convicted of conspiracy and extortion concerning kickbacks for city and county contracts. (1971)
- Mayor of Jersey City, John V. Kenny (D) In 1971, he was prosecuted by the U.S. Attorney's Office for the District of New Jersey and convicted, along with the then-mayor Whelan and former City Council president Thomas Flaherty, in federal court of conspiracy and extortion in a multimillion-dollar political kickback scheme on city and county contracts.

== New York ==
- State Assemblyman Martin S. Auer (R) was convicted of a kickback scheme with insurance agencies (1979)
- State Senator Lloyd H. Paterson (R) convicted of 20 counts of grand larceny and five counts of falsifying business records, having embezzled more than $68,000 from private estates. He was forced to give up his seat, sentenced to five years' probation and fined $18,500 (1978)

=== Local ===
- New York City Councilman Matthew Troy (D) pleaded guilty to a federal charge of filing a 1972 income tax return that failed to include $37,000 stolen from clients of his law practice (1976)

== Oklahoma ==
- Governor David Hall (D), was convicted of extortion and conspiracy and served 19 months of a three-year sentence. (1975)

== Pennsylvania ==
- State Senator William E. Duffield (D) was sentenced to six months in prison for 11 counts of mail fraud. (1975)
- State Senator Henry Cianfrani (D) convicted on federal charges of racketeering and mail fraud, Cianfrani was sentenced to five years in federal prison. After serving for twenty-seven months, he was released in 1980.

=== Local ===
- Mayor of Chester, Pennsylvania John H. Nacrelli convicted of federal bribery and racketeering. (1979)

== Wisconsin ==
- State Representative James Lewis (R) attempted to persuade scientist Myron Muckerheide to create a laser gun "designed to blind people", and to sell it to Guatemalan Colonel Federico Fuentes. Lewis pleaded guilty to perjury for lying to a federal grand jury investigating the scheme and was removed from office. (1979)
- State Senator James Devitt (R) was found guilty of giving felony false testimony by attempting to conceal a campaign contribution. He was also removed from office. (1974)

== West Virginia ==
- Governor of West Virginia Wally Barron (D) was convicted of jury tampering. (1971)

== See also ==
- List of federal political scandals in the United States
- List of federal political sex scandals in the United States

Federal politicians:

- List of American federal politicians convicted of crimes
- List of United States representatives expelled, censured, or reprimanded
- List of United States senators expelled or censured
