= List of 1930s American state and local politicians convicted of crimes =

This list includes American politicians at the state and local levels who have been convicted of felony crimes committed while in office by decade; this list encompasses the 1930s.

At the bottom of the article are links to related articles which deal with politicians who are involved in federal scandals (political and sexual), as well as differentiating among federal, state and local convictions. Also excluded are crimes which occur outside the politician's tenure in office unless they specifically stem from acts during his time of service.

Entries are arranged by date, from most current to less recent, and by state.

== California ==
=== Local ===
- Mayor of San Diego Rutherford B. Irones (R), convicted of a hit and run (1935)

== Connecticut ==
- Mayor of Waterbury Frank Heyes (D) convicted of corruption
- State Senator Nathan Spiro (R), pleaded guilty to accepting a bribe and was fined $1,500 (1938)

== Louisiana ==
- Governor Richard W. Leche (D) sentenced to 10 years in prison for fraud. (1939)

== Maine ==
- Sheriff of Sagadahoc county Albert H Henderson (?), convicted of three counts of liquor conspiracy. (1935)

== Michigan ==
- State Representative Miles M. Callaghan (R) resigned his seat after pleading guilty to charges of legislative graft and conspiracy. (1939)

== Missouri ==
=== Local ===
- Mayor of Springfield Thomas H Gideon (R) Convicted of conspiracy to break prohibition laws. (1930)

== Oklahoma ==
=== Local ===
- Creek county Sheriff Lew Wilder (?) Convicted of liquor conspiricy (1938)

== Pennsylvania ==
- State Senator John J. McClure (R) was convicted of vice and rum running but was overturned on appeal.

== See also ==
- List of federal political scandals in the United States
- List of federal political sex scandals in the United States

Federal politicians:

- List of American federal politicians convicted of crimes
- List of United States representatives expelled, censured, or reprimanded
- List of United States senators expelled or censured
