= List of 1890s American state and local politicians convicted of crimes =

This list includes American politicians at the state and local levels who have been convicted of felony crimes committed while in office by decade; this list encompasses the 1890s.

At the bottom of the article are links to related articles which deal with politicians who are involved in federal scandals (political and sexual), as well as differentiating among federal, state and local convictions. Also excluded are crimes which occur outside the politician's tenure in office unless they specifically stem from acts during his time of service.

Entries are arranged by date, from most current to less recent, and by state.

== Kansas ==
=== Local ===
- Sheriff of Mitchell County, Kansas Jospeth M Meyers (populist) convicted of adultery. (1897)

== Maryland ==
- State Treasurer Stevenson Archer (D) was found guilty of embezzling $132,000 and sentenced to five years. (1890)

== Missouri ==
- State Treasurer Edward T. Noland (D), following reports of his drunkenness and gambling, an investigation found a shortage in state funds of about $32,000. He was suspended from office and resigned. He was then arrested, charged with embezzlement, tried, convicted and sentenced to two years in prison. (1890)

== See also ==
- List of federal political scandals in the United States
- List of federal political sex scandals in the United States

Federal politicians:

- List of American federal politicians convicted of crimes
- List of United States representatives expelled, censured, or reprimanded
- List of United States senators expelled or censured
