= List of 1920s American state and local politicians convicted of crimes =

This list includes American politicians at the state and local levels who have been convicted of felony crimes committed while in office by decade; this list encompasses the 1920s.

At the bottom of the article are links to related articles which deal with politicians who are involved in federal scandals (political and sexual), as well as differentiating among federal, state and local convictions. Also excluded are crimes which occur outside the politician's tenure in office unless they specifically stem from acts during his time of service.

Entries are arranged by date, from most current to less recent, and by state.

== Indiana ==
- Governor of Indiana Warren McCray (R) convicted of mail fraud and served three years. (1924)

=== Local ===
- Mayor of Indianapolis John Duvall (R) was convicted of bribery and jailed. (1927)

== Massachusetts ==
- State Representative C. F. Nelson Pratt (R) was found guilty of simple assault after being charged with attempted felonious assault. He was fined $100. (1928)

== Oklahoma ==
=== Local ===
- Okmulgee sheriff Lon Kuhn (?) convicted of failing to enforce liquor laws. (1921)

== Vermont ==
=== Local ===
- Sheriff of Windsor Wallis I Fairbanks (?) Convicted of Adulatory (1926)

== Wisconsin ==
- State Assemblyman Clark M. Perry (R) pleaded guilty to a charge of liquor conspiracy and was sentenced to three years in prison. (1926)

== See also ==
- List of federal political scandals in the United States
- List of federal political sex scandals in the United States

Federal politicians:

- List of American federal politicians convicted of crimes
- List of United States representatives expelled, censured, or reprimanded
- List of United States senators expelled or censured
