= List of 1980s American state and local politicians convicted of crimes =

This list includes American politicians at the state and local levels who have been convicted of felony crimes committed while in office by decade; this list encompasses the 1980s.

At the bottom of the article are links to related articles which deal with politicians who are involved in federal scandals (political and sexual), as well as differentiating among federal, state and local convictions. Also excluded are crimes which occur outside the politician's tenure in office unless they specifically stem from acts during his or her time of service.

Entries are arranged by date, from most current to less recent, and by state.

== Alabama ==
- State Representative Thomas Reed (D) convicted of bribery (1988)

=== Local ===
- Party Leader of the National States' Rights Party J. B. Stoner (D) convicted of 1958 bombing of the Bethel Baptist Church in Birmingham, Alabama.

== Alaska ==
- State Senator Paul Fischer (R), pled guilty to misuse of state funds and taking illegal campaign contributions from an oil-field construction company. (1989)
- State Senator George Hohman (D) State Senator, bribed to obtain a water-bomber aircraft for the state. Sentenced to 3 years and fined $30,000. (1982)

== Arizona ==
- Governor of Arizona Evan Mecham (R) was found guilty of obstruction of justice and misuse of government funds. (1988)

== Arkansas ==
- State Representative Preston Bynum (R) convicted of bribery. (1980)

== California ==
- Several officials were caught up in the BRISPEC sting operation. The officials include:
  - Board of Equalization Member Paul B. Carpenter (D)
  - State Senator Joseph B. Montoya (D)
  - State Senator Alan Robbins (D)
  - State Senator Frank C. Hill (R)
  - Assemblymember Pat Nolan (R)

=== Local ===
- Chief Administrative Officer of San Francisco Roger Boas (D) convicted of rape. (1988)

== Florida ==
- State Representative Don Gaffney (D) convicted of extortion. (1989)

== Hawaii ==
- State Representative Clifford Uwaine (D) convicted of conspiracy. (1982)

== Illinois ==
- Governor of Illinois Dan Walker (D) was convicted of improprieties stemming from loans from a Savings and Loan. He served 18 months in prison. (1987)
- State Senator Edward Nedza (D) convicted of fraud. (1987)
- Attorney General of Illinois William J. Scott (R) was convicted of tax fraud and sentenced to a year in prison. (1980)

=== Local ===
- Alderman of Chicago Marian Humes (D) convicted of bribery. (1989)
- Alderman of Chicago Perry Hutchinson (D) convicted of bribery. (1988)
- Alderman of Chicago Chester Kuta (D) convicted of bribery. (1987)
- Alderman of Chicago Wallace David Jr (D) convicted of bribery. (1987)
- Alderman of Chicago Clifford Kelley (D) convicted of corruption. (1987)
- Alderman of Chicago Louis Farina (D) convicted of extortion. (1983)
- Alderman of Chicago Tyrone Kenner (D) convicted of bribery. (1983)
- Alderman of Chicago William Carothers (D) convicted of extortion. (1983)
- Alderman of Chicago Stanley Zydlo (D) convicted of extortion. (1980)

== Louisiana ==
- President of the Louisiana State Senate Michael Hanley O'Keefe, Sr. (D) jailed for mail fraud. (1983) In February 1983, he was convicted of mail fraud and two counts of obstruction of justice.
- State Agriculture Commissioner Gil Dozier (D) was convicted of extortion and racketeering and jury tampering. (1982)
- State Senator Gaston Gerald (D) convicted of bribery. (1981)

== Maine ==
- State Representative Donald F. Sproul (R) was sentenced to 10 days in prison for ballot tampering.

== Massachusetts ==
- Transportation Secretary Barry Locke (D) was convicted of conspiring to take payoffs as part of a kickback scheme at the MBTA. (1982)

== Michigan ==
- State Senator Jerry C. Diggs (D) accepting bribes to kill taxes on race track revenue; He was tried, convicted, and sentenced (1983)

== Nebraska ==
- Attorney General Paul L. Douglas (R) was convicted of perjury and resigned. (1984)
- State Senator James Pappas (R-D) from North Platte was charged with circulating a petition in a county in which he was not qualified and lying about it. He was found guilty, fined and placed on probation for two years. (1986)

== New Hampshire ==
- State Representative Vincent Palumbo (R) pled guilty to bank fraud and tax evasion. He was sentenced to more than a year (1989)

== New Jersey ==
=== Local ===
- Mayor of Newark Kenneth A. Gibson (D) was convicted of bribery and for stealing funds from a school construction. (1986)

== New York ==
- State Senator Richard E. Schermerhorn (R) was convicted of income-tax evasion, obstruction of justice and filing a false statement. Sentenced to 18 months in prison. (1989)
- State Senator William C. Brennan (D) convicted of bribery. (1984)
- State Senator Joseph R. Pisani (R) was convicted of multiple counts of fraud and tax evasion, most of which were overturned on appeal. The Appeals Court upheld one conviction for taking money from an escrow account from his client. (1983) In 1986, Pisani pleaded guilty to other charges of tax evasion, and was sentenced to one year in prison.

== Oregon ==
- State Senator Bill Olson (R) pleaded guilty to second-degree sex abuse with a 13-year-old female. (1988)

== Pennsylvania ==
- Pennsylvania Auditor General Al Benedict (D) convicted of racketeering. (1988)
- State Treasurer R. Budd Dwyer (R) was convicted of bribery. (1987)

=== Local ===
- President of the Philadelphia City Council George X. Schwartz (D) was convicted of taking bribes. (1985)
- Member of the Philadelphia City Council Harry Jannotti (D) was convicted of taking bribes. (1985)
- Member of the Philadelphia City Council Louis Johanson (D) was convicted of taking bribes. (1985)

== Tennessee ==
- FBI investigation Operation Rocky Top concerned the illegal sale of charity bingo licenses which resulted in over 50 convictions. Two targets of the investigation committed suicide: Tennessee Secretary of State Gentry Crowell (D) (in December 1989, just before he was scheduled to testify for a third time before a federal grand jury) and long-time State Representative Ted Ray Miller (D) (after being charged with bribery). (1986)
- Governor of Tennessee Ray Blanton (D) convicted of wire fraud and sentenced to 22 months. (1982)
- State Representative Emmitt Ford (D) was convicted of fraud. (1981)
- State Representative Tommy Burnett (D) jailed for 10 months for tax evasion. (1983)
- State Representative Robert J. Fisher (R), was convicted of soliciting a $1,000 bribe from Carter County Sheriff George Papantoniou to kill a state bill the sheriff opposed. Fisher was given a $500 fine and a 30-day suspended sentence and was expelled from the State Senate by a vote of 92–1 (1980)

== Texas ==
- State Representative Mike Martin (R) from Longview, hired his cousin to shoot him as a publicity stunt. He pleaded guilty to perjury and paid a $2,000 fine on the condition that he also resign. (1982)

== Vermont ==
=== Local ===
- Assistant Judge Jane Wheel of Chittenden County was convicted of three counts of falsifying court records so she could claim pay for days she had not actually worked. She was sentenced to one to three years in prison on each count, with all but 45 days suspended, plus 1,500 hours of community service. (1987) Wheel's investigation was part of a larger investigation into possible corruption among members of the Vermont Supreme Court. (1988) (See also Vermont vs Hunt (1982).)

== Washington ==
- State Senator Gordon Walgren (D) convicted of violating the Travel Act during the investigation called GAMSCAM. (1980)
- State Representative John A. Bagnariol (D) was convicted of racketeering charges during the investigation called GAMSCAM. (1980

== Wisconsin ==
- State Senator Richard Shoemaker (D) convicted of receiving illegal money. (1988)
- State Assemblyman Walter L. Ward, Jr. (D) convicted of sexual assault. (1980)

== West Virginia ==
- State Senator Dan R. Tonkovich (D) pleaded guilty to extorting $5,000 from gambling interests. He was sentenced to five years in prison. (1989)
- State Senate Larry Tucker (D) extorted $10,000 from a lobbyist, resigned and pleaded guilty. (1989)

== See also ==
- List of federal political scandals in the United States
- List of federal political sex scandals in the United States

Federal politicians:

- List of American federal politicians convicted of crimes
- List of United States representatives expelled, censured, or reprimanded
- List of United States senators expelled or censured
