= List of 1900s American state and local politicians convicted of crimes =

This list includes American politicians at the state and local levels who have been convicted of felony crimes committed while in office by decade; this list encompasses the 1900s.

At the bottom of the article are links to related articles which deal with politicians who are involved in federal scandals (political and sexual), as well as differentiating among federal, state and local convictions. Also excluded are crimes which occur outside the politician's tenure in office unless they specifically stem from acts during his time of service.

Entries are arranged by date, from most current to less recent, and by state.

== Kentucky ==
- State Auditor Henry Eckert Youtsey (R) State Auditor, was found guilty of conspiracy in the assassination of Governor William J. Goebel (D) and was sentenced to life in prison (1900)
- Secretary of State Caleb Powers (R) was convicted as an accessory to the assassination of Democratic Governor William J. Goebel. Powers served eight years in jail. (1900) He was pardoned in 1908.

== Massachusetts ==
=== Local ===
- Boston Alderman George H. Battis (R) was convicted of larceny for overcharging the city of Boston $334.25 for trophies he purchased for the East Boston's Fourth of July celebrations in 1906 and 1907. He received a three-year sentence, but was pardoned by Governor Eben Sumner Draper and the Massachusetts Governor's Council after a year-and-a-half. (1909)

== Michigan ==
- State Representative D. Judson Hammond (R) from Oakland County, convicted of soliciting a bribe of $500 to defeat a bill opposed by wholesale grocers; sentenced to two years in prison. (1903)
- State Treasurer Frank Porter Glazier (R) convicted of embezzlement; served two years in prison (1908)

== Missouri ==
- State Senator William P. Sullivan (R) convicted of accepting a bribe concerning his vote on the "pure food law" and fined $100. (1905)

== New York ==
- State Assemblyman Max Eckmann (R) found guilty of conspiracy to manufacture false voting petitions, fined $500 (1906)

== Oklahoma ==
=== Local ===
- Sheriff of Oklahoma County Harvey D Garrison (?) convicted of liquor related bribery. (1909)

== Pennsylvania ==
- Treasurer of Pennsylvania, William L. Mathues (R) Mathues was convicted in connection to the Pennsylvania State Capitol graft scandal and sentenced to two years in prison. He died before incarceration. (1908)

== See also ==
- List of federal political scandals in the United States
- List of federal political sex scandals in the United States

Federal politicians:

- List of American federal politicians convicted of crimes
- List of United States representatives expelled, censured, or reprimanded
- List of United States senators expelled or censured
