= 1983 congressional page sex scandal =

US House political scandal

The 1983 congressional page sex scandal was a political scandal involving members of the United States House of Representatives.

== Reprimand recommendation ==
On July 14, 1983, the House Ethics Committee recommended that Rep. Dan Crane (R-IL) and Rep. Gerry Studds (D-MA) be reprimanded for having engaged in sexual relationships with minors, specifically 17-year-old congressional pages. Though at least some of the sexual contact was not criminal (the age of consent in the District of Columbia being 16 years), the committee felt "any sexual relationship between a member of the House of Representatives and a congressional page, or any sexual advance by a member to a page, represents a serious breach of duty." The Congressional Report found that in 1980, a year after entering office, Crane had sex four or five times at his suburban apartment with a female page and in 1973, the year he entered office, Studds invited a male page, who testified he felt no ill will towards Studds, to his Georgetown apartment and later on a two-week trip to Portugal. Both representatives admitted to the charges.

== Motion to censure ==
On July 20, 1983, the House voted by a supermajority to revise the reprimand recommendation to censure, a more extreme measure. Censure had never previously been used in a case of sexual misconduct. The motion to censure the two House members was introduced by Rep. Robert H. Michel (R-IL), the Republican House Minority Leader. Aides later said that Michel proposed this bill to head off a move by Republicans to expel the two legislators. Rep. Newt Gingrich (R-GA) was one of the leaders of the calls for the expulsion of Crane and Studds.

At the beginning of the debate, Crane said, "I want the members to know I am sorry and that I apologize to one and all." When he was called to be censured, Crane stood facing the House. According to The New York Times, after the censure was read, Crane, escorted by a friend, quickly left the chamber. However, an Associated Press article says that Crane walked back to his seat in the rear of the House and slumped in it. Crane would go on to lose the 1984 election.

Studds gave up his right to a public hearing reluctantly, saying that he objected to the conclusions of the Ethics Committee but wanted to protect the privacy of the pages involved and that the affair was a "mutually voluntary, private relationship between adults." At the same time, Studds did admit to "a very serious error in judgment," saying that he should not have had sex with a congressional subordinate, regardless of the individual's age or sex. As his censure was read, Studds faced the Speaker who was reading the motion, with his back to the other House members. Studds continued to be re-elected until his retirement in 1997; he died in 2006.

== Impact ==
Shortly after this scandal, the House Page Board was established for the purpose of protecting pages.

== See also ==
- Chandra Levy, a congressional intern whose relationship with a House member created a scandal
- Mark Foley scandal, a 2006 scandal involving a House member's sexually explicit contact with minor pages
- Franklin Coverup Hoax, a 1989 scandal involving allegations of child sexual abuse by prominent U.S. politicians.
- Clinton–Lewinsky scandal, a scandal involving President Bill Clinton's affair with intern Monica Lewinsky
- Katie Hill, first female House member to resign due to allegations of affairs with congressional and campaign staff
- List of federal political sex scandals in the United States
