= Jamaal Bowman =

American politician and educator (born 1976)

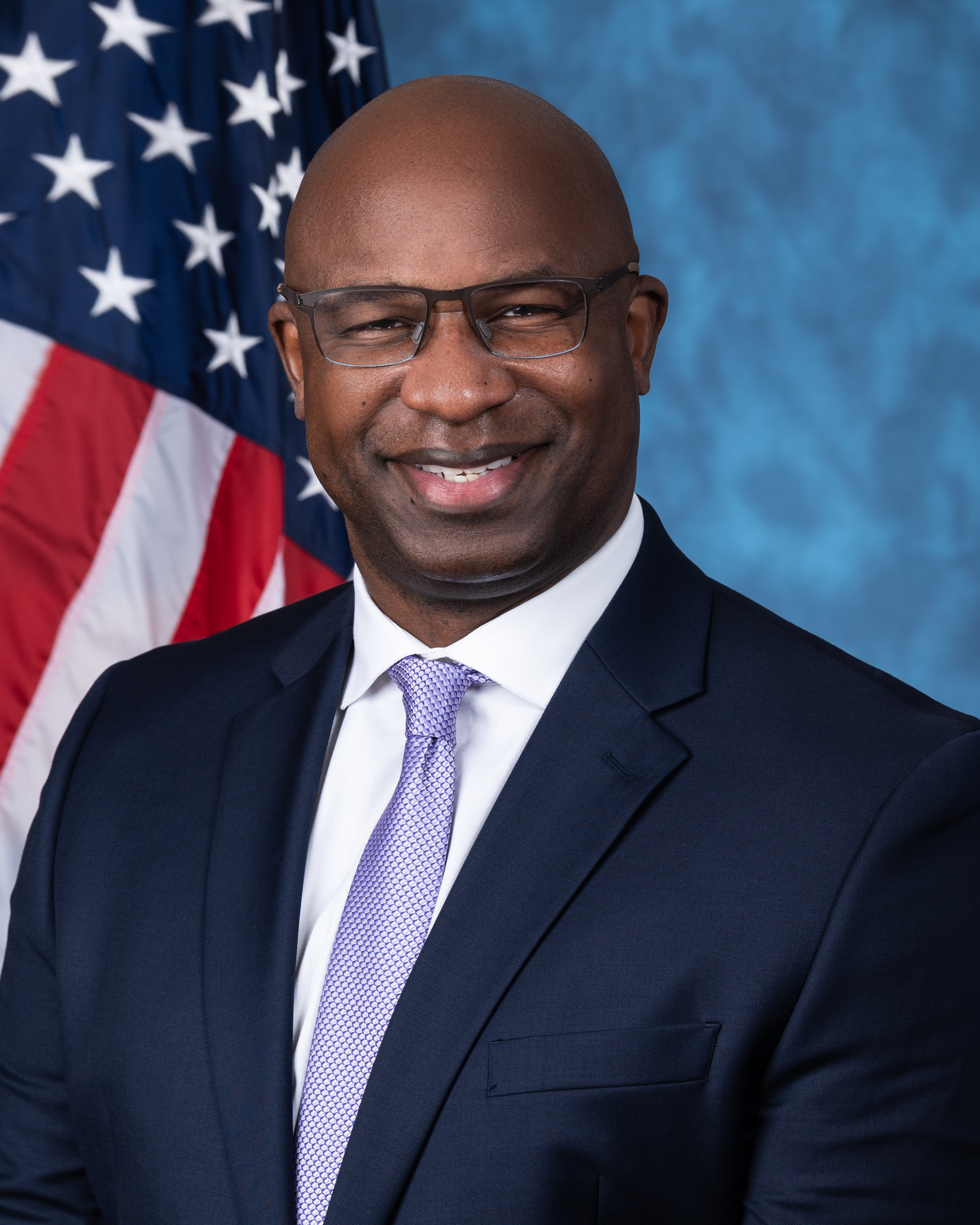
- Official portrait, 2020

Member of the U.S. House of Representatives from New York's 16th district
- In office January 3, 2021 – January 3, 2025
- Preceded by: Eliot Engel
- Succeeded by: George Latimer

Personal details
- Born: Jamaal Anthony Bowman; April 1, 1976 (age 50) New York City, New York, U.S.
- Party: Democratic
- Other political affiliations: Democratic Socialists of America (until 2022; 2024–present)
- Spouse: Melissa Oppenheimer
- Children: 3
- Education: Potomac State College; University of New Haven (BA); Mercy College (MA); Manhattanville College (EdD)
- Website: Campaign website
- Bowman's voice Bowman honoring Caribbean-American Heritage Month. Recorded June 22, 2022

Jamaal Anthony Bowman (born April 1, 1976) is an American politician and former educator who served from 2021 to 2025 as the United States representative for New York's 16th congressional district.

Bowman is the founder and former principal of the Cornerstone Academy for Social Action, a public middle school in Eastchester, Bronx. He defeated 16-term incumbent Eliot Engel in the 2020 Democratic primary and was first elected to Congress that November. He was a member of the Squad, an informal group of leftist members of the House Democratic Caucus. On October 26, 2023, Bowman pleaded guilty to a misdemeanor for willfully setting off a false fire alarm in the Cannon House Office Building. Bowman paid a $1,000 fine and the charge was later dropped. On December 7, the House of Representatives voted 214–191 to censure him for the fire alarm incident.

A critic of U.S. support for Israel during the Gaza war, Bowman sought re-election in 2024, but lost renomination in the Democratic primary to Westchester County Executive George Latimer. Bowman lost renomination 41.4%–58.6% in what was the most expensive primary race for a House seat in U.S. history (until Thomas Massie's primary in 2026).

== Early life and education ==
Jamaal Anthony Bowman was born on April 1, 1976, in Manhattan, a borough of New York City. He lived with his grandmother in the East River Houses in East Harlem during the week, and on weekends with his mother and sisters in Yorkville on the Upper East Side. His grandmother died when he was eight years old, after which he lived full time on the Upper East Side. At age 16, he moved with his family to Sayreville, New Jersey. He graduated from Sayreville War Memorial High School, where he played on the football team.

Bowman briefly attended Potomac State Junior College in West Virginia before earning a Bachelor of Arts in sports management from the University of New Haven in 1999. At the University of New Haven, he played college football as a linebacker for the New Haven Chargers. Bowman earned a Master of Arts in counseling from Mercy College in 2006 and a Doctor of Education in educational leadership from Manhattanville College in 2019.

== Teaching career ==
After earning his undergraduate degree, Bowman decided not to pursue a career in sports management. Upon the suggestion of a family friend who worked for the New York City Department of Education, Bowman began working as an educator. His first job was as a crisis management teacher in a South Bronx elementary school. In 2009, he founded Cornerstone Academy for Social Action, a public middle school in the Bronx.

As principal of Cornerstone Academy for Social Action, Bowman curated a "wall of honor" featuring likenesses of prominent Black, Latino, and Asian individuals. Its honorees included Martin Luther King Jr., Sonia Sotomayor, Cynthia McKinney, Mutulu Shakur, and Assata Shakur. HuffPost political reporter Daniel Marans criticized Bowman for including "a notorious antisemite and two Black militants convicted of murder and armed robbery"; Bowman's campaign spokesperson responded that it is "a rhetorical tool of the far right to insinuate educating students on major figures of Black American history is serving to promote hateful or divisive rhetoric or actions." Bowman later denounced McKinney's statements as antisemitic.

Bowman became a leading advocate against standardized testing, calling it "slavery". His blog on the role of standardized testing received national attention. He wrote that high-stakes testing had a role in perpetuating inequalities, including turnover, tumult, and a vicious cycle it creates in students' and educators' lives, saying performance assessments damage a school's ability to teach.

Bowman also advocated for children to receive arts, history, and science education in addition to the basics of literacy and numeracy. Bowman's school policy used a restorative justice model to address the school-to-prison pipeline. After 10 years as principal, he left the job to focus on his congressional campaign.

== U.S. House of Representatives ==
=== Elections ===
==== 2020 ====
2020 Democratic primary results by precinct: Bowman: 30–40%; 40–50%; 50–60%; 60–70%; 70–80%; 80–90%; 90–100%; Engel: 40–50%; 50–60%; 60–70%; 70–80%; 80–90%; 90–100%; Tie: 40–50% Tie; 50% Tie; No votes Interactive map version

The progressive Justice Democrats recruited Bowman to run for the United States House of Representatives in New York's 16th congressional district, which was represented by 16-term incumbent Eliot Engel. The district included parts of the Bronx and Westchester County, respectively. Engel had served as a member of the House since 1989 and as chair of the United States House Committee on Foreign Affairs since the first session of the 116th United States Congress. Bowman was inspired to run by the insurgent 2018 campaign of Alexandria Ocasio-Cortez. He described his platform as "anti-poverty and anti-racist", with support for housing, criminal justice reform, education, Medicare for All, and a Green New Deal.

Bowman's campaign criticized Engel's record on foreign policy and response to the COVID-19 pandemic. Bowman's endorsements from the Sunrise Movement and the New York Working Families Party helped his campaign to raise funds, although Engel enjoyed a significant fundraising advantage. Bowman was also endorsed by Ocasio-Cortez, Bernie Sanders, Elizabeth Warren, and the editorial board of The New York Times.

Bowman won the primary on July 17, 2020, with 55% of the vote. In the general election, he defeated Conservative nominee Patrick McManus with 84% of the vote.

==== 2022 ====
2022 Democratic primary results by precinct Bowman: 30–40%; 40–50%; 50–60%; 60–70%; 70–80%; 80–90%; 90–100%; Gashi: 30–40%; 40–50%; 50–60%; 60–70%; 70–80%; 80–90%; 90–100%; Parker: 40–50%; 60–70%; Tie: 30–40%; 40–50%; 50%; No votes Interactive map version

Bowman was challenged in the Democratic primary by Westchester County legislator Vedat Gashi, who was endorsed by Bowman's predecessor and 2020 primary opponent, Eliot Engel. Redistricting affected the demographics of the district, which continued to include southern Westchester County and a portion of the northern Bronx. Bowman won the Democratic primary and proceeded to win the general election with 64% of the vote.

==== 2024 ====
2024 Democratic primary results by precinct: Latimer: 50–60%; 60–70%; 70–80%; 80–90%; 90–100%; Bowman: 50–60%; 60–70%; 70–80%; 80–90%; 90–100%; 50% Tie No votes Interactive map version

A frequent critic of U.S. support for Israel during the Gaza war, Bowman was challenged by pro-Israel Westchester County Executive George Latimer in the Democratic primary. The New York Times described the contest as "a marquee showcase of the party's divisions over the Israel-Hamas war".

The primary was the most expensive House primary in U.S. history, with $15 million in outside spending coming from the American Israel Public Affairs Committee (AIPAC) benefiting Latimer's campaign. Much of the outside spending came from groups affiliated with the pro-Israel AIPAC.

Latimer defeated Bowman, 58.59% to 41.41%. Bowman was the first of two Democratic congressional incumbents to lose a primary in the 2024 election cycle, with the other being Cori Bush. He also was the first member of the Squad to lose a primary.

=== Tenure ===
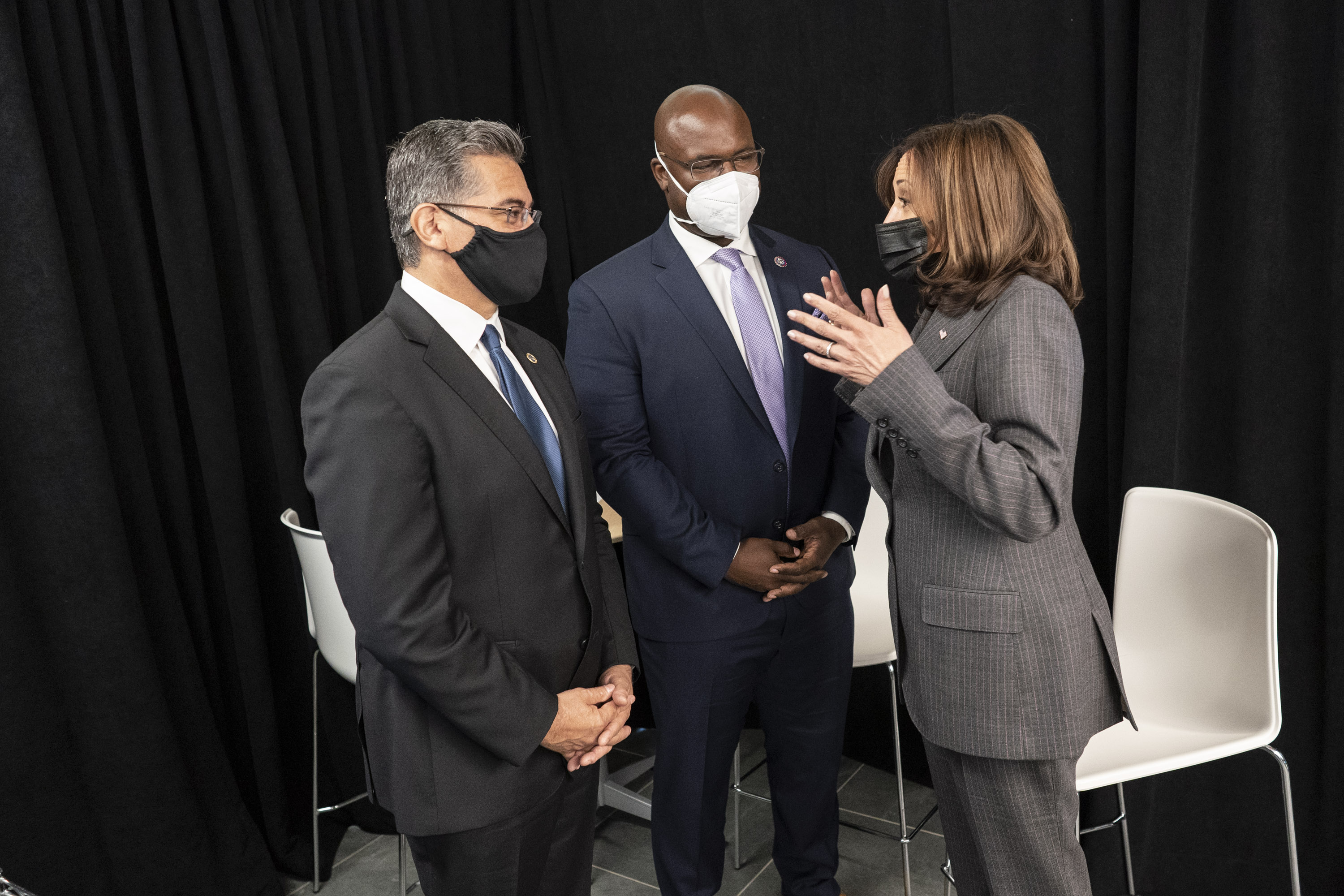
Bowman with Vice President Kamala Harris and Secretary Xavier Becerra

Upon his swearing-in, Bowman joined The Squad, a group of progressive Democratic lawmakers.

In January 2021, following the storming of the United States Capitol, Bowman introduced the Congressional Oversight of Unjust Policing Act (COUP Act) to establish a commission to investigate how United States Capitol Police handled the storming of the Capitol and to look at potential ties of some of its members to white nationalism. Bowman said that introducing the bill was "critical when you look at the disparity in terms of how the Capitol Police responded to the insurrection on Wednesday, versus how they responded to—not just [Black Lives Matter] protestors this summer, but other people of color, and people who are disabled, historically". The legislation came after Nancy Pelosi and Chuck Schumer called for the Capitol Police chief's resignation.

On November 5, 2021, Bowman was one of six House Democrats to break with their party and vote against the Infrastructure Investment and Jobs Act because it did not include the Build Back Better Act.

In 2023, Bowman reintroduced H.R. 4108, the Healthy Future Students and Earth Pilot Program Act, which he had cosponsored in 2021 with Nydia Velázquez. The bill aimed to establish a pilot grant program introducing plant-based food and beverage options in school lunches. Bowman did not cosponsor the bill in the 2023-2024 session, though he publicly voiced support for it.

Bowman was among the 46 House Democrats who voted against final passage of the Fiscal Responsibility Act of 2023.

==== Fire alarm incident and House censure ====
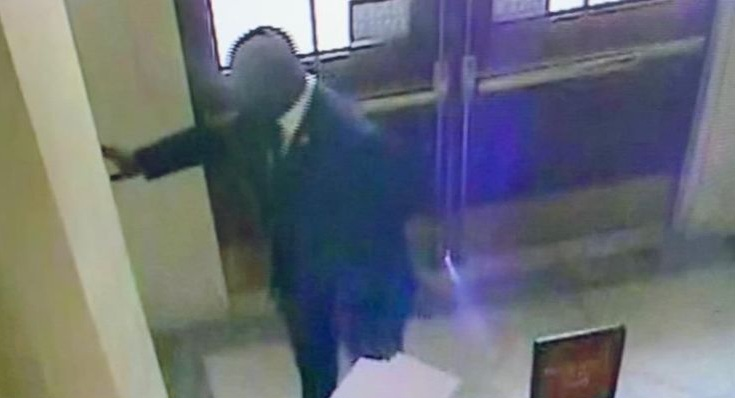
Bowman pulling the alarm

On September 30, 2023, while House Democrats were attempting to delay a vote on a bill that would avoid a government shutdown, Bowman pulled a fire alarm in the Cannon House Office Building. Bowman's action caused the building to be evacuated for an hour and a half. Bowman initially claimed that he had set off the alarm by accident, telling reporters, "I thought the alarm would open the door". His office circulated a memo with "suggested talking points" about the incident among Democratic colleagues, which was subsequently obtained by the media. One such talking point read "I believe Congressman Bowman when he says this was an accident. Republicans need to instead focus their energy on the Nazi members of their party before anything else." Bowman later apologized and stated that he had not approved the use of the term "Nazi". Then-House Speaker Kevin McCarthy (R-CA-20) alleged that Bowman activated the fire alarm as a delay tactic and promised that Bowman would be punished. Other House Republicans suggested disciplinary measures ranging from censure to expulsion.

After a Capitol Police investigation, Bowman accepted a deal in which he pleaded guilty to the misdemeanor crime of falsely pulling a fire alarm, paid the maximum fine of $1,000, and wrote a letter of apology to police; in exchange, prosecutors agreed to drop the charges against him after three months. Bowman paid the required fine. In January 2024, the charges against Bowman were dismissed and his guilty plea was withdrawn.

On December 7, 2023, the House censured Bowman for his conduct in the fire alarm incident. The vote was 214 to 191, with five members voting "present", and three Democrats; Jahana Hayes (CT-05), Chris Pappas (NH-01), and Marie Gluesenkamp Pérez (WA-03); joining House Republicans in voting to censure Bowman. Afterwards, the House Ethics Committee dropped its review of Bowman's actions as moot.

==== Foreign and defense policy ====
In September 2021, Bowman voted in favor of providing Israel with an additional $1 billion in aid to fund its Iron Dome missile defense system. His vote was controversial among members of the Democratic Socialists of America (DSA), and sparked debate within the DSA about whether it should require that its members support Boycott, Divestment, and Sanctions against Israel. A spokesman confirmed in October 2023 that Bowman had let his DSA membership expire in 2022 following DSA's response to his vote. But in May 2024, Bowman rejoined the organization and was endorsed by its New York City chapter. This came as he faced a strong primary challenge from George Latimer, who was endorsed by many pro-Israel lobby groups.

Bowman was among 51 House Democrats who voted against the final passage of the 2022 National Defense Authorization Act. Explaining his vote, he said, "it is astounding how quickly Congress moves weapons but we can't ensure housing, care, and justice for our veterans, nor invest in robust jobs programs for districts like mine."

On July 18, 2023, Bowman and eight other progressive Democrats voted against a congressional non-binding resolution proposed by August Pfluger that "the State of Israel is not a racist or apartheid state", that Congress rejects "all forms of antisemitism and xenophobia", and that "the United States will always be a staunch partner and supporter of Israel".

On October 25, Bowman and eight other progressive Democrats, along with Republican Thomas Massie, voted against a resolution supporting Israel following the October 7 attacks.

On November 17, Bowman called reports of Israeli women being raped during the 2023 Hamas attack "propaganda" and a "lie". After Politico reached out to his office about his statements in March 2024, Bowman retracted his previous remarks. Bowman apologized in June 2024, saying, "Immediately when the U.N. provided additional evidence, I voted to condemn the sexual violence." The liberal Zionist pro-Israel lobbying group J Street withdrew its endorsement of Bowman on January 29, 2024, citing the "framing and approach" of his response to the Hamas attack, with J Street President Jeremy Ben-Ami saying that Bowman had "gone too far".

=== Committee assignments ===
- Committee on Education and the Workforce
  - Subcommittee on Early Childhood, Elementary, and Secondary Education
- Committee on Science, Space, and Technology
  - Subcommittee on Energy (Ranking Member)
  - Subcommittee on Space and Aeronautics

=== Caucus memberships ===
- Congressional Black Caucus
- Congressional Progressive Caucus
- Congressional Ukraine Caucus

== Post-congressional career ==
In February 2025, Bowman started his own Super PAC, Built to Win PAC, to support progressive candidates in competitive elections by mobilizing nonwhite voters disillusioned with the Democratic Party. He did not name any specific candidates that his PAC would support, but said that it would target races against any congressional candidates that support Israeli Prime Minister Benjamin Netanyahu, as well as those receiving support from cryptocurrency PACs or real estate lobbyists.

In November 2026, Bowman and commentator Nomiki Konst launched "Run Ro", a draft effort to encourage California Congressman Ro Khanna to seek the Democratic nomination for President in 2028.

== Electoral history ==
=== 2020 ===
2020 Democratic primary results in New York's 16th congressional district
Party	Candidate	Votes	%	±%
Democratic	Jamaal Bowman	49,367	55.4	
Democratic	Eliot Engel (incumbent)	36,149	40.6	
Democratic	Chris Fink	1,625	1.8	
Democratic	Sammy Ravelo	1,139	1.3	
Democratic	Andom Ghebreghiorgis (withdrawn)	761	0.9	
Total votes		89,041	100.0	

2020 general election results in New York's 16th congressional district
Party	Candidate	Votes	%
Democratic	Jamaal Bowman	218,471	84.2
Conservative	Patrick McManus	41,085	15.8
Total votes		259,556	100.0
Democratic hold			

=== 2022 ===
2022 Democratic primary results in New York's 16th congressional district
Party	Candidate	Votes	%
Democratic	Jamaal Bowman (incumbent)	21,643	54.2
Democratic	Vedat Gashi	10,009	25.0
Democratic	Catherine Parker	7,503	18.8
Democratic	Mark Jaffee	608	1.5
Total votes		39,961	100.0

2022 general election results in New York's 16th congressional district
Party	Candidate	Votes	%
Democratic	Jamaal Bowman (incumbent)	133,567	64.2
Republican	Miriam Flisser	74,156	35.7
Total votes		207,723	100.0

=== 2024 ===
2024 Democratic primary results in New York's 16th congressional district
Party	Candidate	Votes	%
Democratic	George Latimer	45,909	58.59%
Democratic	Jamaal Bowman (incumbent)	32,440	41.41%
Total votes		78,349	100.00%

== Personal life ==
Bowman lives with his wife, Melissa Oppenheimer, and their three children in Yonkers, New York. Bowman is a fan of New York hip-hop group Wu-Tang Clan. He described hip-hop as a "culture that is created by teenagers who were forgotten about, and because they were forgotten about, they were forced to come together and create something beautiful". Bowman drew inspiration from the Wu-Tang Clan during his underdog 2020 campaign. He was frequently seen in a Wu-Tang Clan-emblazoned face covering during the COVID-19 pandemic, which GQ noted allowed Bowman to send voters a message.

From 2011 to 2014, Bowman maintained a blog on which he promoted 9/11 conspiracy theories. After the blog was reported on by The Daily Beast, Bowman said he regretted his posts. In May 2024, The Daily Beast revealed that Bowman's personal YouTube account was subscribed to dozens of fringe conspiracy channels, at least several of which he had subscribed to since being elected to Congress. In response, Bowman denied knowledge of any of the channels or their content.

== See also ==
- List of African-American United States representatives
- Progressivism in the United States § In the 21st century
- List of United States representatives expelled, censured, or reprimanded

U.S. House of Representatives
Preceded by Eliot Engel	Member of the U.S. House of Representatives from New York's 16th congressional district 2021–2025	Succeeded by George Latimer
U.S. order of precedence (ceremonial)
Preceded by Dan Donovan as Former U.S. Representative	Order of precedence of the United States as Former U.S. Representative	Succeeded by Larry Kissell as Former U.S. Representative
