= Caribbean-American Heritage Month =

National heritage month

Caribbean-American Heritage and Culture Month
- Observed by: United States
- Type: National, heritage, cultural, ethnic
- Significance: Celebration of Caribbean Americans contributions
- Date: Month of June
- Frequency: annual

Caribbean-American Heritage Month is celebrated by proclamation of the President and Congress in the United States in June to honor the achievements and contributions of Caribbean immigrants and their descendants living in the United States, particularly in government, sports, entertainment, and the arts. Events are held throughout the month celebrating and educating the public about Caribbean-American history and culture.

The heritage month was first officially observed in 2006, after being unanimously adopted by the House of Representatives on June 27, 2005 in H. Con. Res. 71, sponsored by Congresswoman Barbara Lee, recognizing the significance of Caribbean people and their descendants in the history and culture of the United States. The Senate adopted the resolution on February 14, 2006, which was introduced by Senator Chuck Schumer of New York. On June 5, 2006, George W. Bush issued a presidential proclamation declaring that June be annually recognized as National Caribbean American Heritage Month to celebrate the contributions of Caribbean Americans (both naturalized and US citizens by birth) in the United States. Since the declaration, the White House has issued an annual proclamation recognizing June as National Caribbean-American Heritage Month.

== George W. Bush Caribbean-American Heritage Month Proclamations ==
Proclamation 8028 – Caribbean-American Heritage Month, 2006

Proclamation 8153 – Caribbean-American Heritage Month, 2007

Proclamation 8262 – Caribbean-American Heritage Month, 2008

== Barack Obama Caribbean-American Heritage Month Proclamations ==
Proclamation 8390 – Caribbean-American Heritage Month, 2009

Proclamation 8530 – Caribbean-American Heritage Month, 2010

Proclamation 8686 – Caribbean-American Heritage Month, 2011

Proclamation 8835 – Caribbean-American Heritage Month, 2012

Proclamation 8990 – Caribbean-American Heritage Month, 2013

Proclamation 9137 – Caribbean-American Heritage Month, 2014

Proclamation 9291 – Caribbean-American Heritage Month, 2015

Proclamation 9458 – Caribbean-American Heritage Month, 2016

== Donald Trump Caribbean-American Heritage Month Proclamations ==
Proclamation 9620 – Caribbean-American Heritage Month, 2017

Proclamation 9760 – Caribbean-American Heritage Month, 2018

Proclamation 9899 – Caribbean-American Heritage Month, 2019

Proclamation 10046 – Caribbean-American Heritage Month, 2020

== See also ==
- Notable Caribbean Americans and Americans of Caribbean descent
