= Expulsion from the United States Congress =

Most serious disciplinary action that can be taken against a Member

Expulsion is the most serious form of disciplinary action that can be taken against a member of Congress. The United States Constitution (Article I, Section 5, Clause 2) provides that "Each House [of Congress] may determine the Rules of its proceedings, punish its members for disorderly behavior, and with the concurrence of two-thirds, expel a member." The process for expulsion from the House of Representatives differs somewhat from the process for expulsion from the Senate.

Censure, a less severe form of disciplinary action, is an official sanction of a member. Similarly, the House may also issue a reprimand against a member, which is itself regarded as less severe than a censure. Neither actions remove a member from office.

== Process leading to expulsion ==
Presently, the disciplinary process begins when a resolution to expel or censure a member is referred to the appropriate committee. In the House, this is the Committee on Ethics (House Ethics Committee); in the Senate, this is the Select Committee on Ethics (Senate Ethics Committee).

The committee may then ask other Representatives or Senators to come forward with complaints about the member under consideration or may initiate an investigation into the member's actions. Sometimes, members may refer a resolution calling for an investigation into a particular member or matter that may lead to the recommendation of expulsion or censure.

Rule XI (Procedures of committees and unfinished business) of the Rules of the House of Representatives states that the Committee on Standards of Official Conduct can investigate allegations that a member violated "any law, rule, regulation, or other standard of conduct applicable to the conduct of such Member ... in the performance of his duties or the discharge of his responsibilities". The Senate Select Committee on Ethics has the equivalent jurisdiction. The committee may then report back to their whole chamber as to its findings and recommendations for further actions.

When an investigation is launched by either committee, an investigatory subcommittee will be formed. Once the investigatory subcommittee has collected evidence, talked to witnesses, and held an adjudicatory hearing, it will vote on whether the member is found to have committed the specific actions and then will vote on recommendations. If expulsion is the recommendation then the subcommittee's report will be referred to the full House of Representatives or Senate where members may vote to accept, reject, or alter the report's recommendation. Voting to expel requires the concurrence of two-thirds of the members. This is set out in Article 1, Section 5, Clause 2 of the United States Constitution.

== Expulsions from Congress ==
In the entire history of the United States Congress, 21 members have been expelled: 15 from the Senate and six from the House of Representatives. Of these 21 members, 17 were expelled for supporting the Confederate States in 1861 and 1862; this was also the last time any Senator was expelled. One member's expulsion, Senator William K. Sebastian of Arkansas, was posthumously reversed. The U.S. Constitution requires that vacancies in the House of Representatives be filled with a special election. Censure has been a much more common form of disciplinary action in Congress over the years, as it requires a much lower threshold of votes to impose.

Table key
N.V.	No recorded vote
†	Posthumously reversed

Expelled members of Congress
Portrait	Name	Year	Chamber	Party	State	Reason	Vote	Ref.
	William Blount	1797	Senate	Democratic-Republican	Tennessee	Treason and conspiracy to incite a rebellion of Creek and Cherokee to aid the British in conquering the Spanish territory of West Florida.	25–1	
	James M. Mason	1861	Senate	Democratic	Virginia	Supporting the Confederate rebellion.	32–10	
	Robert M. T. Hunter	1861	Senate	Democratic	Virginia	Supporting the Confederate rebellion.	32–10	
	Thomas L. Clingman	1861	Senate	Democratic	North Carolina	Supporting the Confederate rebellion.	32–10	
	Thomas Bragg	1861	Senate	Democratic	North Carolina	Supporting the Confederate rebellion.	32–10	
	James Chesnut Jr.	1861	Senate	Democratic	South Carolina	Supporting the Confederate rebellion.	32–10	
	Alfred O. P. Nicholson	1861	Senate	Democratic	Tennessee	Supporting the Confederate rebellion.	32–10	
	William K. Sebastian †	1861	Senate	Democratic	Arkansas	Supporting the Confederate rebellion.	32–10	
	Charles B. Mitchel	1861	Senate	Democratic	Arkansas	Supporting the Confederate rebellion.	32–10	
	John Hemphill	1861	Senate	Democratic	Texas	Supporting the Confederate rebellion.	32–10	
	Louis Wigfall	1861	Senate	Democratic	Texas	Supporting the Confederate rebellion.	32–10	
	John C. Breckinridge	1861	Senate	Democratic	Kentucky	Supporting the Confederate rebellion.	36–0	
	Trusten Polk	1862	Senate	Democratic	Missouri	Supporting the Confederate rebellion.	36–0	
	Waldo P. Johnson	1862	Senate	Democratic	Missouri	Supporting the Confederate rebellion.	35–0	
	Jesse D. Bright	1862	Senate	Democratic	Indiana	Supporting the Confederate rebellion.	32–14	
	John Bullock Clark	1862	House	Democratic	Missouri	Supporting the Confederate rebellion.	94–45	
	John William Reid	1862	House	Democratic	Missouri	Supporting the Confederate rebellion.	N.V.	
	Henry Cornelius Burnett	1862	House	Democratic	Kentucky	Supporting the Confederate rebellion.	N.V.	
	Michael Myers	1980	House	Democratic	Pennsylvania	Conviction for bribery in connection with the Abscam scandal.	376–30	
	James Traficant	2002	House	Democratic	Ohio	Conviction for bribery, racketeering, and tax evasion.	420–1	
	George Santos	2023	House	Republican	New York	Findings of fraud and misuse of campaign funds by the House Ethics Committee.	311–114	

== Other initiations of actions to expel ==
There have been numerous other attempts to expel members of Congress. In many of those instances members under serious threat of expulsion resigned, including:

- 1862: Senator James F. Simmons, Republican of Rhode Island. On July 14, 1862, the Judiciary Committee reported that the charges of corruption against Simmons were "essentially correct"; The Senate adjourned three days later, and Simmons resigned on August 15 before the Senate could take action.
- 1906: Senator Joseph R. Burton, Republican of Kansas. Resigned after the Supreme Court upheld his conviction on charges of receiving compensation for intervening with a federal agency.
- 1922: Senator Truman H. Newberry, Republican of Michigan. On March 20, 1920, Newberry was convicted on charges of violating campaign finance laws by spending $3,750 to secure his Senate election. The Supreme Court overturned this decision on May 2, 1921, on the grounds that the Senate exceeded its powers in attempting to regulate primary elections. On January 12, 1922, the Senate voted 46–41 that Newberry was duly elected in 1918. However, after certain members resumed their efforts to unseat him, Newberry resigned on November 18, 1922, two days before the start of the third session of the 67th Congress.
- 1981: Representative Raymond F. Lederer, Democrat of Pennsylvania, was the only member of the Abscam scandal to win re-election. However he resigned due to "personal legal problems" a week after the House Ethics Committee recommended his expulsion for accepting a $50,000 bribe.
- 1982: Senator Harrison A. Williams, Democrat of New Jersey, resigned after the Committee on Ethics recommended his expulsion due to his "ethically repugnant" actions in the Abscam scandal.
- 1995: Senator Bob Packwood, Republican of Oregon, resigned after the Committee on Ethics recommended his expulsion due to his gross sexual misconduct and his attempts to enrich himself through his official position.
- 2006: Representative Bob Ney, Republican of Ohio, resigned after being convicted in connection with the Jack Abramoff scandals.
- 2024: Senator Bob Menendez, Democrat of New Jersey. On August 20, 2024, Menendez resigned his Senate seat. He was found guilty on 16 counts of bribery and could face lengthy prison time. He received a Mercedes-Benz car, 13 gold bars, and $486,461 in cash. The gold bars and cash were found stuffed into bags, boxes, boots, and jackets when the FBI raided his home on June 16, 2022.
- 2026: Representatives Eric Swalwell, Democrat of California, and Tony Gonzales, Republican of Texas, both facing allegations of sexual misconduct, resigned amid threats of expulsion; Swalwell was accused of sexual assault and rape, while Gonzales admitted to an affair with a woman who later committed self-immolation, both cases involving staffers. Representative Sheila Cherfilus-McCormick, Democrat of Florida, was found guilty by the House Ethics Committee for financial fraud and was later indicted by a grand jury; she resigned amid threats of expulsion.

There were other instances in which investigations were brought, but the defendants were exonerated, expulsion was rejected, insufficient evidence was found, or the member's term expired:

- 1808: Senator John Smith, Democratic-Republican of Ohio, was implicated in the Aaron Burr-led conspiracy to invade Mexico and create a new country in the west. Senator John Quincy Adams of Massachusetts led the attempt to expel Smith from the Senate while Francis Scott Key defended Smith before the Senate. Expulsion failed 19 to 10, less than the two-thirds majority needed. At request of the Ohio Legislature, Smith resigned two weeks after the vote.
- 1856: Congressman Preston Brooks, Democrat of South Carolina, beat Senator Charles Sumner with a cane. For this incident, he avoided expulsion but resigned; he was then re-elected by the legislature of South Carolina, who considered him a hero.
- 1862: The expulsion of Senator Lazarus W. Powell, Democrat of Kentucky, was sought for support for Confederate rebellion. Unlike the three Senators expelled for that reason the same year and the eleven Senators the previous year, Powell was not expelled.
- 1873: Senator James W. Patterson, Republican of New Hampshire, was accused of corruption, and a Senate select committee recommended expulsion on February 27. On March 1, a Republican caucus decided that there was insufficient time remaining in the session to deliberate the matter. Patterson's term expired March 3, and no further action was taken.
- 1893: Senator William N. Roach, Democrat of North Dakota, was accused of embezzlement that had allegedly occurred 13 years earlier. After extensive deliberation, the Senate took no action, assuming that it lacked jurisdiction over members' behavior before their election to the Senate.
- 1905: Senator John H. Mitchell, Republican of Oregon, was indicted on corruption charges on January 1, 1905, and was convicted on July 5 of that year, during a Senate recess. He died on December 8, while his case was still on appeal and before the Senate, which had convened on December 4, could take any action against him.
- 1907: Senator Reed Smoot, Republican of Utah, a leader in the LDS Church, was the subject of a two-year investigation by the Committee on Privileges and Elections, which found that Smoot was not due his seat in the Senate because he was "a leader in a religion that advocated polygamy which is contrary to the U.S. Constitution". Smoot's expulsion failed by a vote of 27–43 after the Senate decided that he fit the constitutional requirements to be a Senator.
- 1919: Senator Robert M. La Follette Sr., Republican of Wisconsin, was accused of disloyalty after a 1917 speech he gave in opposition to U.S. entry into World War I. The Committee on Privileges and Elections recommended that La Follette not be expelled and the Senate concurred in a 50–21 vote.
- 1924: Senator Burton K. Wheeler, Democrat of Montana, was indicted for conflict of interest, specifically acting as a lawyer, while a senator, in cases in which the U.S. was a party. A Senate committee, however, found that his dealings related to litigation before state courts and that he received no compensation for any service before federal departments. The Senate exonerated him by a vote of 56–5.
- 1934: The Committee on Privileges and Elections, jointly considering the case of Senators John H. Overton and Huey P. Long, both Democrats of Louisiana, determined that the evidence to support charges of election fraud were insufficient to warrant further consideration.
- 1942: Senator William Langer of North Dakota who was seated conditionally pending the result of an investigation by the Committee on Privileges and Elections over his history of alleged political corruption. The Committee found that though Langer met the qualifications for election, and had not committed any acts that would justify his expulsion, his "moral turpitude" was not conducive to allowing him to remain in the body. The committee recommended his expulsion, but the full Senate voted against the recommendation.
- 2023: Representative Jamaal Bowman, Democrat of New York, had a motion of expulsion brought against him by 13 House Republicans after pulling a fire alarm during a vote over an impending government shutdown. Bowman was accused of pulling the alarm, which was in a building other than the Capitol, to delay the bill. Bowman stated that he thought that pulling the alarm would open a locked door and that it was not an attempt to delay the vote. Bowman was caught on camera pulling the fire alarm. He pleaded guilty in October 2023 and agreed to pay a $1,000 fine. He was subsequently censured in a 214–191 vote on December 7, 2023, with three Democrats joining House Republicans in voting for the censure. Afterwards, the House Ethics Committee dropped its review of Bowman's actions as moot. Several months later, Bowman lost his primary reelection bid in the most expensive primary race in the history of the United States.
- 2023: Representative George Santos, Republican of New York, faced a motion of expulsion on November 1 following several criminal fraud charges. The motion failed by a vote of 179–213, with 19 voting present, insufficient to meet the two-thirds threshold. Support was mostly from Democrats, joined by 24 Republicans, while 31 Democrats joined Republicans in opposing. Following the report of an ethics probe, a second motion resulted in his expulsion on December 1, with a vote of 311–114.

== See also ==
- Federal impeachment in the United States
- List of federal political scandals in the United States
- List of United States senators expelled or censured
- List of United States representatives expelled, censured, or reprimanded
- Resignation from the United States Senate
