= List of United States representatives expelled, censured, or reprimanded =

The United States Constitution (Article 1, Section 5) gives the House of Representatives the power to expel any member by a two-thirds vote. Expulsion of a representative is rare: only six members of the House have been expelled in its history. Three of those six were expelled in 1861 for joining the Confederate States of America.

There are also less severe measures with which the House is authorized to discipline members. Censure and reprimand are procedures in which the House may vote to express formal disapproval of a member's conduct. Only a simple majority vote is required. Members who are censured must stand in the well of the House chamber to receive a reading of the censure resolution. A reprimand was once considered synonymous with censure, but in 1976 the House defined a reprimand as a less severe punishment. Members who are reprimanded are not required to stand in the well of the House and have the resolution read to them.

Representatives can also be censured by their state legislatures and state party.

== Expelled representatives ==
Year	Representative	Party	State	Vote count	Reason
1861	John B. Clark	Democratic	Missouri	94–45	Supporting Confederate rebellion.
1861	John W. Reid	Democratic	Missouri		Supporting Confederate rebellion.
1861	Henry C. Burnett	Democratic	Kentucky		Supporting Confederate rebellion.
1980	Michael Myers	Democratic	Pennsylvania	376–30	Convicted of bribery in the Abscam scandal.
2002	James Traficant	Democratic	Ohio	420–1 (with 9 "present")	Convicted on ten counts including bribery, conspiracy to defraud the United States, corruption, obstruction of justice, tax evasion, and racketeering.
2023	George Santos	Republican	New York	311–114 (with 2 "present") (Note: Santos survived two previous expulsion votes prior to getting expelled on December 1, 2023. The two previous votes were held prior to the release of the report by the Ethics Committee.)	Findings of fraud and misuse of campaign funds by the House Ethics Committee.

== Censured representatives ==
Year	Representative	Party	State	Vote count	Reason
1832	William Stanbery	National Republican	Ohio	93–44	Insulting the Speaker of the House.
1842	Joshua Giddings	Whig	Ohio	125–69	Introducing an anti-slavery resolution deemed to be incendiary, and violation of the gag rule prohibiting discussion of slavery.
1856	Laurence M. Keitt	Democratic	South Carolina	106–96	Assisting in the caning of Charles Sumner.
1864	Benjamin G. Harris	Democratic	Maryland	98–20	Making statements in support of the Confederate rebellion.
1864	Alexander Long	Democratic	Ohio	80–70	Making statements in support of the Confederate rebellion.
1866	John W. Chanler	Democratic	New York	72–30	Insulting the House with a resolution containing unparliamentary language.
1866	Lovell Rousseau	Unconditional Unionist	Kentucky	89–30	Assaulting Rep. Josiah Grinnell on the floor of the House.
1867	John W. Hunter	Democratic	New York	77–33	Using unparliamentary language.
1868	Fernando Wood	Democratic	New York	114–39	Using unparliamentary language.
1869	Edward D. Holbrook	Democratic	Idaho Territory		Using unparliamentary language.
1870	Benjamin Whittemore	Republican	South Carolina	187–0	Selling military academy appointments.
1870	John T. Deweese	Republican	North Carolina	170–0	Selling military academy appointments.
1870	Roderick Butler	Republican	Tennessee	158–0	Selling military academy appointments.
1873	Oakes Ames	Republican	Massachusetts	182–36	Involvement in the Crédit Mobilier of America scandal.
1873	James Brooks	Democratic	New York	174–32	Involvement in the Crédit Mobilier of America scandal.
1875	John Y. Brown	Democratic	Kentucky	161–79	Using unparliamentary language.
1890	William D. Bynum	Democratic	Indiana	126–104	Using unparliamentary language.
1921	Thomas L. Blanton	Democratic	Texas	293–0	Using unparliamentary language.
1979	Charles Diggs	Democratic	Michigan	414–0	Payroll fraud and mail fraud.
1979	Daniel Flood	Democratic	Pennsylvania		Bribery
1980	Charles H. Wilson	Democratic	California	voice vote	Improper use of campaign funds.
1983	Daniel B. Crane	Republican	Illinois	420–3	Engaging in sexual conduct with a House page.
1983	Gerry Studds	Democratic	Massachusetts	421–3	Engaging in sexual conduct with a House page.
2010	Charles Rangel	Democratic	New York	333–79	Improper solicitation of funds, making inaccurate financial disclosure statements, and failure to pay taxes.
2021	Paul Gosar	Republican	Arizona	223–207 (with 1 "present")	Posted an anime video on social media depicting himself committing violence against Representative Alexandria Ocasio-Cortez and President Joe Biden.
2023	Adam Schiff	Democratic	California	213–209 (with 6 "present")	Making allegations regarding Russian collusion in the 2016 U.S. presidential election and the first impeachment of Donald Trump.
2023	Rashida Tlaib	Democratic	Michigan	234–188 (with 4 "present")	Comments related to the Gaza war.
2023	Jamaal Bowman	Democratic	New York	214–191 (with 5 "present")	Pulling the fire alarm in one of the Capitol office buildings under non-emergency circumstances.
2025	Al Green	Democratic	Texas	224–198 (with 2 "present")	Disrupting Donald Trump's joint session address.
2026	Chuck Edwards	Republican	North Carolina	413–2	Inappropriate conduct and behavior with female staffers.

== Reprimanded representatives ==
Year	Representative	Party	State	Vote count	Reason
1976	Robert L. F. Sikes	Democratic	Florida	381–3 (with 5 "present")	Use of office for personal gain.
1978	Charles H. Wilson	Democratic	California	328–41 (with 29 "present")	Role in South Korean influence-buying scandal.
1978	John J. McFall	Democratic	California	Voice vote	Role in South Korean influence-buying scandal.
1978	Edward Roybal	Democratic	California	Voice vote	Role in South Korean influence-buying scandal.
1984	George V. Hansen	Republican	Idaho	354–52 (with 6 "present")	False statements on a financial disclosure form.
1987	Austin Murphy	Democratic	Pennsylvania	324–68 (with 20 "present")	Allowed another person to cast his vote, and misused House funds.
1990	Barney Frank	Democratic	Massachusetts	408–18	Used office to fix 33 parking tickets on behalf of a friend and wrote a misleading memorandum on behalf of the friend to shorten his probation for criminal convictions.
1995	Bob Dornan	Republican	California	Voice vote	Criticism of President Bill Clinton as having "[given] aid and comfort to the enemy" during the Vietnam war in a floor speech. Dornan's remarks were stricken from the official record and he was banned from speaking on the House floor for 24 hours.
1997	Newt Gingrich	Republican	Georgia	395–28	Use of a tax-exempt organization for political purposes, and providing false information to the House Ethics Committee.
2009	Joe Wilson	Republican	South Carolina	240–179 (with 5 "present")	Making an outburst towards President Barack Obama during a speech to a joint session of Congress.
2012	Laura Richardson	Democratic	California	Voice vote	Compelling her congressional office staff to work for her 2010 election campaign and perform personal errands; also fined $10,000.
2020	David Schweikert	Republican	Arizona	Voice vote	Permitting his office to misuse taxpayer funds and various violations of campaign finance reporting requirements, federal law and House rules.
2025	Chuy Garcia	Democratic	Illinois	236–186 (with 4 "present")	Withdrawing from reelection several hours prior to the filing deadline, effectively handing the Democratic nomination to his chief of staff.

== Excluded representatives-elect ==
Year	Representative-elect	Party	State	Details
1899	Brigham Henry Roberts	Democratic	Utah	Denied seat for his practice of polygamy.
1919	Victor L. Berger	Socialist	Wisconsin	Denied seat on basis of opposition to World War I and conviction under the Espionage Act; the Supreme Court later overturned the conviction.
1920	Victor L. Berger	Socialist	Wisconsin	After being denied a seat the first time, Wisconsin's 5th congressional district reelected Berger in a special election, though Congress again refused to seat Berger, leaving the seat open until 1921.
1967	Adam Clayton Powell Jr.	Democratic	New York	Mismanaging his committee's budget in previous Congress, excessive absenteeism, misuse of public funds. Powell was reelected to the seat for one more term. This exclusion led to a Supreme Court case which held that the exclusion was unconstitutional and that Congress can only exclude members who do not meet the minimum constitutional qualifications for membership.

== See also ==
- Censure in the United States
- List of federal political scandals in the United States
- List of federal political sex scandals in the United States

Federal politicians:

- List of American federal politicians convicted of crimes
- List of United States senators expelled or censured

State and local politics:

- List of American state and local politicians convicted of crimes
