= List of American federal politicians convicted of crimes =

This list consists of American politicians convicted of crimes either committed or prosecuted while holding office in the federal government. It includes politicians who were convicted or pleaded guilty in a court of law. It applies to federal officeholders, whether elected or appointed.

It does not include politicians involved in unprosecuted scandals (which may or may not have been illegal in nature), or politicians who have only been arrested or indicted.

The list also does not include crimes that occur outside the politician's tenure unless they specifically stem from acts while they were in office. It does not include convictions which were vacated (e.g. Ted Stevens (R)), but does include convictions that were pardoned.

Although the convicted politicians are arranged by presidential terms in chronological order, many of the crimes have little or no connection to who is president. Since the passage of 20th Amendment on January 23, 1933, presidential terms have begun on January 20 of the year following the presidential election; prior to that, they began on March 4.

== 1776–1897 ==
- Matthew Lyon (DR-VT). First congressman to be recommended for censure after spitting on Roger Griswold (Federalist-Connecticut). The censure failed to pass. Separately, found guilty of violating Alien and Sedition Acts and sentenced to four months in jail, during which time he was re-elected (1798).
- Charles F. Mitchell (R-NY) U.S. Representative from New York's 33rd District was convicted of forgery, sentenced to one year in prison and fined, though he was paroled early due to poor health (1841).
- Robert Smalls (R-SC) U.S. Representative from South Carolina was charged with accepting a $5,000 (equivalent to $151,172 in 2025) bribe in 1877 in relation to a government printing contract and was found guilty. Smalls was pardoned in 1879 by South Carolina Governor William Simpson.

== 1901–1909 (Theodore Roosevelt presidency) ==
=== Legislative branch ===
- Joseph R. Burton Senator (R-KS) was convicted of accepting a $2,500 (equivalent to $89,583 in 2025) bribe (1904).
- John H. Mitchell Senator (R-OR) was involved with the Oregon land fraud scandal, for which he was indicted and convicted while a sitting U.S. Senator (1905).
- Henry B. Cassel (R-PA) was convicted of fraud related to the construction of the Pennsylvania State Capitol (1909).

== 1909–1913 (William Howard Taft presidency) ==
=== Legislative branch ===
- William Lorimer Senator (R-IL), The 'blond boss of Chicago' was found guilty of accepting bribes in 1912.

=== Judicial branch ===
- Robert W. Archbald (R) Judge of the United States Court of Appeals for the Third Circuit, was convicted of corruption in 1912.

== 1921–1923 (Warren G. Harding presidency) ==
=== Executive branch ===
- Albert Fall (R) Secretary of the Interior who was bribed by Harry F. Sinclair for control of the Teapot Dome federal oil reserves in Wyoming. He was the first U.S. cabinet member to ever be convicted; he served two years in prison (1922).

== 1923–1929 (Calvin Coolidge presidency) ==
=== Executive branch ===
- William P. MacCracken Jr. (R) Assistant Secretary of Commerce for Aeronautics convicted of contempt of congress for the Air Mail scandal (1934).

=== Legislative branch ===
- John W. Langley (R-KY) convicted of violating the Volstead Act (Prohibition). He had also been caught trying to bribe a Prohibition officer. He was sentenced to two years, after which his wife Katherine G. Langley ran for Congress in his place and won two full terms (1926).

== 1929–1933 (Herbert Hoover presidency) ==
=== Legislative branch ===
- Harry E. Rowbottom (R-IN) was convicted in Federal court of accepting bribes from persons who sought post office appointments. He served one year in Leavenworth (1931).

== 1933–1945 (Franklin D. Roosevelt presidency) ==
=== Legislative branch ===
- Michael J. Hogan (R-NY) was convicted of bribery and sentenced to a year and a day in a Federal Penitentiary (1935).
- George Ernest Foulkes (D-MI) was convicted of bribery (1935).
- Donald F. Snow (R-ME) was convicted of bribery (1935).
- John H. Hoeppel (D-CA) convicted of selling an appointment to the West Point Military Academy. He was fined $1,000 (equivalent to $23,201 in 2025) and sentenced to 4–12 months in jail (1936).

== 1945–1953 (Harry S. Truman presidency) ==
=== Legislative branch ===
- James M. Curley (D-MA) fined $1,000 (equivalent to $14,419 in 2025) and served six months for fraud before Harry S. Truman commuted the rest of his sentence (1947).
- Andrew J. May (D-KY) convicted of accepting bribes from a war munitions manufacturer. Was sentenced to nine months in prison, after which he was pardoned by Truman (1947).
- J. Parnell Thomas (R-NJ) was convicted of salary fraud and given an 18-month sentence and a fine. He was imprisoned in Danbury Prison. After serving his 18 months he was pardoned by Truman (1950).
- Walter E. Brehm (R-OH) convicted of accepting contributions illegally from one of his employees. Received a 15-month suspended sentence and a $5,000 (equivalent to $62,019 in 2025) fine (1951).

== 1953–1961 (Dwight D. Eisenhower presidency) ==
=== Legislative branch ===
- Orland K. Armstrong (R-MO) was convicted of fraud (1953).
- Ernest K. Bramblett (R-CA) received a suspended sentence and a $5,000 (equivalent to $59,944 in 2025) fine for making false statements in connection with payroll padding and kickbacks from congressional employees (1954).
- Thomas J. Lane (D-MA) convicted for evading taxes on his congressional income. Served 4 months in prison, but was re-elected three more times (1956).

== 1961–1963 (John F. Kennedy presidency) ==
=== Legislative branch ===
- Thomas F. Johnson (D-MD) was convicted of conspiracy and conflict of interest regarding the receipt of illegal gratuities (1962).

== 1963–1969 (Lyndon B. Johnson presidency) ==
=== Legislative branch ===
- Frank W. Boykin (D-AL) was convicted of conspiracy and conflict of interest (1963).
- Daniel Brewster (D-MD) pleaded no contest to accepting "an unlawful gratuity without corrupt intent" (1969).

== 1969–1974 (Richard M. Nixon presidency) ==
=== Executive branch ===
- Watergate (1972–1973) Republican 'bugging' of the Democratic Party National Headquarters at the Watergate Hotel led to a burglary which was discovered. The cover up of the affair by President Richard Nixon (R) and his staff resulted in 69 government officials being charged and 48 pleading guilty, including seven for actual burglary. Eventually, Nixon resigned his position.
  1. John N. Mitchell (R) former United States Attorney General, convicted of perjury.
  2. Richard Kleindienst (R) United States Attorney General, convicted of obstruction, given one month in jail.
  3. H. R. Haldeman (R) White House Chief of Staff, convicted of conspiracy, obstruction of justice, and perjury. Served 18 months in prison.
  4. John Ehrlichman (R) former White House Counsel, convicted of conspiracy, obstruction of justice, and perjury. Served 18 months in prison.
  5. Egil Krogh (R) United States Undersecretary of Transportation, sentenced to six months.
  6. John Dean (R) White House Counsel, convicted of obstruction of justice, later reduced to felony offenses and served 4 months.
  7. Dwight Chapin (R) Secretary to the President of the United States, convicted of perjury.
  8. Charles Colson (R) Special Counsel to the President for Public Liaison, convicted of obstruction of justice. Served 7 months.
- Spiro Agnew (R) Vice President of the United States, pleaded nolo contendere (no contest) to income-tax evasion (1973).
- Maurice Stans (R) United States Secretary of Commerce, pleaded guilty to three counts of violating the reporting sections of the Federal Election Campaign Act and two counts of accepting illegal campaign contributions and was fined $5,000 (1975).

=== Legislative branch ===
- Ted Kennedy (D-MA) drove his car into the channel between Chappaquiddick Island and Martha's Vineyard, killing passenger Mary Jo Kopechne. Kennedy pleaded guilty to leaving the scene of an accident and received a suspended sentence of two months (1969).
- Martin B. McKneally (R-NY) placed on one year's probation and fined $5,000 (equivalent to $39,749 in 2025) for failing to file income tax return. He had not paid taxes for many years prior (1971).
- Cornelius Gallagher (D-NJ) pleaded guilty to tax evasion, and served two years in prison (1972).
- J. Irving Whalley (R-PA) received suspended three-year sentence and fined $11,000 (equivalent to $79,779 in 2025) in 1973 for using mails to deposit staff salary kickbacks and threatening an employee to prevent her from giving information to the FBI (1973).
- Edwin Reinecke (R-CA) convicted of perjury and sentenced to 18 months in prison as part of the Watergate investigation (1973).

== 1974–1977 (Gerald R. Ford presidency) ==
=== Executive branch ===
- Earl Butz (R) United States Secretary of Agriculture. He was charged with failing to report more than $148,000 of income in 1978. Butz pleaded guilty to the tax evasion charge and was sentenced to 30 days in jail and five years of probation and was ordered to make restitution. He served 25 days behind bars before his release.

=== Legislative branch ===
- John V. Dowdy (D-TX) convicted of perjury and served six months in prison (1973).
- Richard T. Hanna (D-CA) convicted in an influence-buying scandal (1974).
- Frank Brasco (D-NY) sentenced to five years in jail and fined $10,000 (equivalent to $65,283 in 2025) for conspiracy to accept bribes from a reputed Mafia figure who sought truck leasing contracts from the Post Office and loans to buy trucks (1974).
- Bertram Podell (D-NY) pleaded guilty to conspiracy and conflict of interest. He was fined $5,000 (equivalent to $32,642 in 2025) and served four months in prison (1974).
- James F. Hastings (R-NY) convicted of kickbacks and mail fraud, he also took money from his employees for personal use. Served 14 months at Allenwood penitentiary (1976).

== 1977–1981 (Jimmy Carter presidency) ==
=== Legislative branch ===
- Andrew J. Hinshaw (R-CA) U.S. Representative was convicted of accepting bribes; he served one year in prison (1977).
- Richard Tonry (D-LA) pleaded guilty to receiving illegal campaign contributions (1977).
- Charles Diggs (D-MI), convicted on 29 charges of mail fraud and filing false payroll forms, which formed a kickback scheme with his staff. Sentenced to three years (1978).
- J. Herbert Burke (R-FL) pleaded guilty to disorderly intoxication, resisting arrest, and nolo contendere to an additional charge of witness tampering; he was sentenced to three months plus fines (1978).
- Frank M. Clark (D-PA) pleaded guilty to mail fraud and tax evasion and was sentenced to two years in prison (1979).

== 1981–1989 (Ronald Reagan presidency) ==
=== Executive branch ===
- Iran–Contra affair (1985–1986); A secret sale of arms to Iran, to secure the release of hostages and allow U.S. intelligence agencies to fund the Nicaraguan Contras, in violation of the Boland Amendment.
  1. Elliott Abrams (R) Assistant Secretary of State for Inter-American Affairs, convicted of withholding evidence. Given two years' probation. Later pardoned by President George H. W. Bush.
- Michael Deaver (R) White House Deputy Chief of Staff to Ronald Reagan, pleaded guilty to perjury related to lobbying activities and was sentenced to 3 years' probation and fined $100,000 (equivalent to $283,392 in 2025) (1987).
- Operation Ill Wind was a three-year investigation launched in 1986 by the FBI into corruption by U.S. government and military officials, and private defense contractors.
  1. Melvyn Paisley (R) Assistant Secretary of the Navy, was found to have accepted hundreds of thousands of dollars in bribes. He pleaded guilty to bribery and served four years in prison.
  2. Victor D. Cohen, Deputy Assistant Secretary of the Air Force, was the 50th conviction obtained under the Ill Wind probe when he pleaded guilty to accepting bribes and conspiring to defraud the government. He was sentenced to 33 months in prison.
  3. James E. Gaines, Deputy Assistant Secretary of the Navy, took over when Paisley resigned his office. Gaines was convicted of accepting an illegal gratuity and theft and conversion of government property. He was sentenced to six months in prison.
- Deborah Gore Dean (R) Assistant Secretary of Housing and Urban Development, convicted of fraud (1988).
- Housing and Urban Development Scandal was a controversy concerning bribery by selected contractors for low income housing projects.
  1. James G. Watt (R) United States Secretary of the Interior, was charged with 25 counts of perjury and obstruction of justice. Sentenced to five years' probation, fined $5,000 (equivalent to $10,565 in 2025) and 500 hours of community service (1995).

=== Legislative branch ===
- Abscam FBI sting involving fake 'Arabs' trying to bribe 31 congressmen (1980). The following Congressmen were convicted:
  1. Harrison A. Williams Senator (D-NJ) Convicted on 9 counts of bribery and conspiracy. Sentenced to 3 years in prison.
  2. John Jenrette (D-SC) sentenced to two years in prison for bribery and conspiracy.
  3. Richard Kelly (R-FL) Accepted $25K and then claimed he was conducting his own investigation into corruption. Served 13 months.
  4. Raymond Lederer (D-PA) "I can give you me" he said after accepting $50K. Sentenced to 3 years.
  5. Michael Myers (D-PA) Accepted $50K saying, "...money talks and bullshit walks." Sentenced to 3 years and was expelled from the House.
  6. Frank Thompson (D-NJ) Sentenced to 3 years.
  7. John M. Murphy (D-NY) Served 20 months of a 3-year sentence.
- Jon Hinson (R-MS) was arrested for having homosexual oral sex in the House of Representatives' bathroom with a government staffer. Hinson, who was married, later received a 30-day jail sentence, and a year's probation, on condition that he get counseling and treatment (1981).
- Joshua Eilberg (D-PA) pleaded guilty to conflict-of-interest charges (1981).
- Dan Flood (D-PA) censured for bribery. After a trial ended in a deadlocked jury, pleaded guilty and was sentenced to a year's probation (1981).
- Frederick W. Richmond (D-NY), Convicted of tax fraud and possession of marijuana. Served 9 months in prison (1982).
- George V. Hansen (R-ID) censured for failing to fill in disclosure forms. Spent 15 months in prison (1984).
- Wedtech scandal Wedtech Corporation was convicted of bribery in connection with Defense Department contracts.
  - Mario Biaggi (D-NY) Convicted of obstruction of justice and accepting illegal gratuities he was sentenced to 2½ years in prison and fined $500K (equivalent to $1,416,960 in 2025) (1987).
  - Robert Garcia (D-NY) was convicted of extorting payoffs from Wedtech. He and his wife, Jane Lee Garcia, were both sentenced to three years in prison (1990).
- Pat Swindall (R-GA) convicted of 6 counts of perjury (1989).

=== Judicial branch ===
- Harry E. Claiborne (D) Chief Judge of the United States District Court for the District of Nevada, was convicted of tax evasion (1984).
- Walter Nixon (D) Chief Judge of the United States District Court for the Southern District of Mississippi, was convicted of perjury and sentenced to five years in prison (1986). He was subsequently impeached by the House and convicted by the Senate (1989).

== 1989–1993 (George H. W. Bush presidency) ==
=== Executive branch ===
- Catalina Vasquez Villalpando, (R) Treasurer of the United States, pleaded guilty to obstruction of justice and tax evasion (1992).

=== Legislative branch ===
- David Durenberger Senator (R-MN) denounced by Senate for unethical financial transactions and then disbarred (1990). He pleaded guilty to misuse of public funds and given one year's probation (1995)
- Jay Kim (R-CA) accepted $250,000 (equivalent to $573,571 in 2025) in illegal 1992 campaign contributions and was sentenced to two months' house arrest (1992).
- Nicholas Mavroules (D-MA) was convicted of extortion, accepting illegal gifts and failing to report them on congressional disclosure and income tax forms. Mavroules pleaded guilty to fifteen counts in April 1993 and was sentenced to a fifteen-month prison term (1993).
- Albert Bustamante (D-TX) was convicted of accepting bribes and sentenced to three-and-one-half years in prison (1993).

=== Judicial branch ===
- Alcee Hastings (D), Judge of the United States District Court for the Southern District of Florida, was impeached by the House and convicted by the Senate of soliciting a bribe (1989). Subsequently, elected to the U.S. House of Representatives (1992).
- Robert Frederick Collins (D), Judge of the United States District Court for the Eastern District of Louisiana, was convicted of bribery and sentenced to six years, ten months (1991).

== 1993–2001 (Bill Clinton presidency) ==
=== Executive branch ===
- Darleen Druyun Principal Deputy United States Under Secretary of the Air Force. She pleaded guilty to inflating the price of contracts to favor her future employer, Boeing. In October 2004, she was sentenced to nine months in jail for corruption, fined $5,000 (equivalent to $8,242 in 2025), given three years of supervised release and 150 hours of community service (2005). CBS News called it "the biggest Pentagon scandal in 20 years" and said that she pleaded guilty to a felony.
- Wade Sanders (D) Deputy Assistant United States Secretary of the Navy, for Reserve Affairs, was sentenced to 37 months in prison on one charge of possession of child pornography (2009).
- Webster Hubbell (D) United States Associate Attorney General convicted of fraud and jailed for 21 months. (1996)

=== Legislative branch ===
- House banking scandal The House of Representatives Bank found that 450 members had overdrawn their checking accounts, but not been penalized. Six were convicted of charges, most only tangentially related to the House Bank itself. Twenty-two more of the most prolific over-drafters were singled out by the House Ethics Committee (1992).
  1. Carroll Hubbard (D-KY) was convicted of illegally funneling money to his wife's 1992 campaign to succeed him in Congress.
  2. Carl C. Perkins (D-KY) pleaded guilty to a check kiting scheme involving several financial institutions (including the House Bank).
  3. Walter Fauntroy (D-DC) was convicted of filing false disclosure forms to hide unauthorized income.
  4. Buz Lukens (R-OH) convicted of bribery and conspiracy.
  5. Mary Rose Oakar (D-OH) pleaded guilty to a misdemeanor campaign finance charge not related to the House Bank.
- Congressional Post Office scandal (1991–1995) was a conspiracy to embezzle House Post Office money through stamps and postal vouchers to congressmen.
  1. Dan Rostenkowski (D-IL) was convicted and sentenced to 18 months in prison, in 1995.
  2. Joe Kolter (D-PA) pleaded guilty to one count of conspiracy and sentenced to 6 months in prison (1996).
- Wes Cooley (R-OR) was convicted of having lied on the 1994 voter information pamphlet about his service in the Army. He was fined and sentenced to two years' probation (1997) He was later convicted of income tax fraud connected to an investment scheme. He was sentenced to one year in prison and to pay restitution of $3.5 million to investors and $138,000 to the IRS.
- Austin Murphy (D-PA) was convicted of one count of voter fraud for filling out absentee ballots for members of a nursing home (1999).
- Mel Reynolds (D-IL) was convicted on 12 counts of sexual assault, obstruction of justice and solicitation of child pornography (1997). He was later convicted of 12 counts of bank fraud (1999).

== 2001–2009 (George W. Bush presidency) ==
=== Executive branch ===
- John Korsmo (R) Chairman of the Federal Housing Finance Board, pleaded guilty to lying to congress (2005).
- Claude Allen (R) Director of the Domestic Policy Council, was arrested for a series of felony thefts in retail stores. He was convicted on one count (2006).
- Lester Crawford (R) Commissioner of the Food and Drug Administration, pleaded guilty to conflict of interest and received 3 years suspended sentence and fined $90,000 (equivalent to $143,736 in 2025) (2006).
- Scooter Libby (R) Chief of Staff to Vice President Dick Cheney (R), convicted of perjury and obstruction of justice in the Plame Affair on March 6, 2007, and was sentenced to 30 months in prison and fined $250,000 (equivalent to $388,180 in 2025). His sentence was commuted by George W. Bush (R) on July 1, 2007 (2007). Libby was pardoned by President Donald Trump on April 13, 2018.
- David Safavian (R) Administrator for the Office of Management and Budget After an overturned conviction and a retrial, he was found guilty of perjury, and sentenced to 12 months (2008).
- Robert E. Coughlin (R) Deputy Chief of Staff for the Criminal Division of the Department of Justice, pleaded guilty to accepting bribes relating to the Jack Abramoff Indian lobbying scandal (2009).
- Felipe Sixto (R) Special Assistant for Intergovernmental Affairs, convicted of misusing money. Sentenced to 30 months (2009).
- Scott Bloch (R) United States Special Counsel, pleaded guilty to criminal contempt of Congress for "willfully and unlawfully withholding pertinent information from a House Committee investigating his decision to have several government computers wiped...." Bloch was sentenced to one day in jail and two years' probation, and also ordered him to pay a $5,000 (equivalent to $6,911 in 2025) fine and perform 200 hours of community service (2013).

=== Legislative branch ===
- Jim Traficant (D-OH) was found guilty on ten felony counts of financial corruption, sentenced to eight years in prison and expelled from the House of Representatives (2002).
- Bill Janklow (R-SD) was convicted of second-degree manslaughter for running a stop sign and killing a motorcyclist. Resigned from the House and given 100 days in the county jail and three years' probation (2003).
- Frank Ballance (D-NC) admitted to federal charges of money laundering and mail fraud in October 2005 and was sentenced to four years in prison (2005).
- Duke Cunningham (R-CA) pleaded guilty November 28, 2005, to charges of conspiracy to commit bribery, mail fraud, wire fraud and tax evasion in what came to be called the Cunningham scandal and was sentenced to over eight years in prison (2005).
- Bob Ney (R-OH) pleaded guilty to conspiracy and making false statements as a result of his receiving trips from Jack Abramoff in exchange for legislative favors in the Jack Abramoff Indian lobbying scandal. Ney received 30 months in prison (2007).
- Larry Craig (R-ID) was arrested for lewd conduct in a men's restroom at the Minneapolis-St. Paul International Airport on June 11, 2007, and entered a guilty plea to a lesser charge of disorderly conduct on August 8, 2007.
- Dennis Hastert (R-IL) Speaker of the United States House of Representatives pleaded guilty for illegally structuring bank transactions related to payment of $3.5 million to quash allegations of sexual misconduct with a student when he was a high school teacher and coach decades earlier (2016).
- William J. Jefferson (D-LA) was charged in August 2005 after the FBI seized $90,000 in cash from his home freezer. He was re-elected to the House in 2006, but lost in 2008. He was convicted November 13, 2009, of 11 counts of bribery and sentenced to 13 years in prison (2009). Jefferson's Chief of Staff Brett Pfeffer, was sentenced to 84 months for bribery (2006).

== 2009–2017 (Barack Obama presidency) ==
=== Executive branch ===
- General David Petraeus (I) Director of the Central Intelligence Agency. On April 23, 2015, a federal judge sentenced Petraeus to two years' probation plus a fine of $100,000 (equivalent to $135,828 in 2025) for providing classified information to Lieutenant Colonel Paula Broadwell (2015).

=== Legislative branch ===
- Dana Rohrabacher (R-CA) was charged with improper use of campaign contributions in a scheme to promote a decoy Democratic candidate in a state assembly election. Rohrabacher was found guilty and fined $50,000 (2012).
- Jesse Jackson Jr. (D-IL) pleaded guilty February 20, 2013, to one count of wire and mail fraud in connection with his misuse of $750,000 in campaign funds. Jackson was sentenced to two-and-one-half years' imprisonment (2013).
- Rick Renzi (R-AZ) was found guilty on 17 of 32 counts against him June 12, 2013, including wire fraud, conspiracy, extortion, racketeering, money laundering and making false statements to insurance regulators (2013).
- Trey Radel (R-FL) was convicted of possession of cocaine in November 2013. As a first-time offender, he was sentenced to one year probation and fined $250. Radel announced he would take a leave of absence, but did not resign. Later, under pressure from a number of Republican leaders, he announced through a spokesperson that he would resign (2013).
- Michael Grimm (R-NY) pleaded guilty to felony tax evasion, the fourth count in a 20-count indictment brought against him for improper use of campaign funds. The guilty plea had a maximum sentence of three years; he was sentenced to eight months in prison (2015).
- Chaka Fattah (D-PA) was convicted on 23 counts of racketeering, fraud, and other corruption charges (2016).
- Corrine Brown (D-FL) was convicted on 18 felony counts of wire and tax fraud, conspiracy, lying to federal investigators, and other corruption charges (2017).
- Anthony Weiner (D-NY) was convicted of sending sexually explicit photos of himself to a 15-year-old girl and was mandated to register as a sex offender. He also was sentenced to 21 months in prison, a sentence that was later reduced to 18 months. He reported to prison in November 2017 and was released in May 2019 (2017).
- Steve Stockman (R-TX) was convicted of fraud (2018).

=== Judicial branch ===
- Samuel B. Kent (R), Judge of the United States District Court for the Southern District of Texas, was sentenced May 11, 2009, to 33 months in prison for having lied about sexually harassing two female employees (2009).
- Jack Camp (R), Senior Judge of the United States District Court for the Northern District of Georgia was arrested in an undercover drug bust while trying to purchase cocaine from an FBI agent and resigned his position after pleading guilty to three criminal charges. He was sentenced to 30 days in jail, fined an undisclosed amount, and ordered to undergo 400 hours of community service (2010).
- Thomas Porteous (D), Judge of the United States District Court for the Eastern District of Louisiana was impeached, convicted and removed from office December 8, 2010, on charges of bribery and lying to Congress (2010).
- Mark E. Fuller (R) Chief Judge of the United States District Court for the Middle District of Alabama, was found guilty of domestic violence and sentenced to 24 weeks of family and domestic training and forced to resign his position (2015).

== 2017–2021 (First Donald Trump presidency) ==
=== Executive branch ===
- Lieutenant General Michael Flynn (D), National Security Advisor, pleaded guilty to lying to the FBI (2017). Flynn was pardoned by Trump in 2020.

=== Legislative branch ===
- Chris Collins (R-NY), pleaded guilty to insider trading (2019).
- Duncan D. Hunter (R-CA), pleaded guilty to misuse of campaign funds (2019).

== 2021–2025 (Joe Biden presidency) ==
=== Executive branch ===
- Donald Trump (R), 45th President of the United States, convicted in state court of 34 counts of first-degree falsifying business records regarding payments to adult film star Stormy Daniels (2024).

=== Legislative branch ===
- TJ Cox (D-CA) convicted of wire fraud. (2025)
- Bob Menendez (D-NJ) was convicted on 16 counts for his role in a bribery scheme, including being an illegal foreign agent (2024).
- George Santos (R-NY) pleaded guilty to felony charges of identity theft and wire fraud, after being expelled from Congress following a report by the House Ethics Committee (2024).
- Jamaal Bowman (D-NY) pleaded guilty to the misdemeanor of falsely pulling a fire alarm (2023).
- Madison Cawthorn (R-NC) pleaded guilty to possession of a dangerous weapon at a TSA checkpoint (2023).

== 2025-2029 (Second Donald Trump presidency) ==
=== Executive branch ===
- Former National Security Advisor John Bolton (R) pleaded guilty to mishandling classified documents. (2026)

== See also ==
- List of federal political scandals in the United States
- List of federal political sex scandals in the United States
- 2017–18 United States political sexual scandals
- List of United States representatives expelled, censured, or reprimanded
- List of United States senators expelled or censured

State and local politics

- List of American state and local politicians convicted of crimes
