= List of federal political sex scandals in the United States =

This list contains notable sex scandals in American history involving incumbent U.S. federal elected politicians and persons appointed with the consent of the United States Senate. This list does not include politicians' sex crimes.

This list is ordered chronologically, with emphasis on modern scandals. Before the 1970s, American media did not cover political sex scandals extensively. Additionally, outing politicians has increased since 1989.

For all listed people, the scandal (or scandalous behavior) occurred while they were occupying a federal office, even if coverage was posthumous.

== Definitions ==
This list does not cover instances or accusations of sexism, homophobia, or exhibitionism that do not include or seek sexual activity.

A scandal is "loss of or damage to reputation caused by actual, accused, or apparent violation of morality or propriety". Scandal is not the same as controversy or unpopularity. Misunderstandings, breaches of ethics, and cover-ups may result in scandals, depending on the amount of publicity generated and the seriousness of the alleged behavior.

== 1796–1899 ==
- Secretary of the Treasury Alexander Hamilton (Federalist) had an affair with Maria Reynolds while both were married to other people (see Hamilton-Reynolds sex scandal). Reynolds's husband blackmailed Hamilton, who paid to maintain secrecy. In 1797, after Hamilton was no longer Treasury Secretary, journalist James Callender publicized the affair. Hamilton made a public apology, stating, "This confession is not made without a blush.... I can never cease to condemn myself for the pang which it may inflict in a bosom eminently entitled to all my gratitude, fidelity, and love." (1796)
- President Thomas Jefferson (Democratic-Republican) was publicly accused, by journalist James Callender in the Jefferson–Hemings controversy, of fathering the children of a woman he enslaved named Sally Hemings. Hemings was the half-sister of Jefferson's late wife Martha. Based partly upon DNA, there is now a scholarly consensus that either Jefferson or a close relative fathered several of Hemings's children. In January 2000, a Thomas Jefferson Foundation research committee concluded that Thomas Jefferson was probably the father of Eston Hemings and likely the father of all six of Hemings's children. A Thomas Jefferson Heritage Society committee, after reviewing essentially the same material, reached different conclusions, namely that Sally Hemings was only a minor figure in Thomas Jefferson's life and that it is very unlikely he fathered any of her children. This committee, in its April 2001 report that was revised in 2011, supported the conclusion that Jefferson's younger brother Randolph (1755-1815) was more than likely the father of at least some of Sally Hemings's children. (1802)
- President Andrew Jackson (Democrat) married divorcée Rachel Donelson Robards in 1794. They had been living as a married couple for several years, having allegedly believed that she was legally divorced from her allegedly abusive first husband, Lewis Robards. During the 1828 presidential campaign, opponents resurfaced the Robards–Donelson–Jackson relationship controversy. Rachel died after Jackson was elected president, shortly before his inauguration. Jackson, bereft at the loss of his wife, blamed her death on the bigamy accusations. (1828)
- Senator (Sen.) Richard Mentor Johnson of Kentucky (Democrat) did not attempt to hide his relationship with an enslaved woman named Julia Chinn, which caused his party to distance itself from him and contributed to his failed Senate re-election bid in 1828. Though they were prohibited from marrying, Johnson treated her as his common-law wife, and they had two children. She died in 1833, before he became vice-president under Martin Van Buren. (1828)
- Secretary of War John Henry Eaton (Democrat) allegedly had an affair with Margaret O'Neill Timberlake (the wife of John B. Timberlake), which reportedly drove Timberlake to suicide (see Petticoat affair). Eaton then married the widow, which led to social and political difficulties during the administration of President Andrew Jackson.
- Sen. James Henry Hammond of South Carolina (Nullifier Party) engaged in a homosexual relationship with a college friend, pursued what he called "a little dalliance" with his teenage nieces, and raped a young woman and a twelve year old girl he held in slavery. The sexual abuse of his nieces became public in 1843 and forced Hammond to withdraw from his Senate bid in 1846, but he became a Senator again in 1857. (1843)
- Sen. Daniel Webster of Massachusetts (Whig) was the subject of accusations by a reporter, Jane Grey Swisshelm, in May 1850, that "his mistresses are generally, if not always, colored women—some of them big black wenches as ugly and vulgar as himself." The national press widely copied charges of infidelity, which are at least partly corroborated by other sources. (1850)
- President James Buchanan (Democrat) and William Rufus King (Democrat), who served as vice-president under Franklin Pierce, were the subject of gossip alleging their having a years-long homosexual affair in Washington, D.C.. Andrew Jackson referred to King as “Miss Nancy.” (1850s)
- Philip Barton Key II, the United States Attorney for the District of Columbia and son of Francis Scott Key, had a public affair with Teresa Bagioli Sickles, the wife of Congressman (and later Civil War Major General) Daniel Sickles, who gunned Key down in broad daylight in Lafayette Square in 1859. Sickles was acquitted of murder after the first successful temporary insanity defense in the United States, put forward by his attorneys James T. Brady, John Graham, and Edwin Stanton (later Lincoln's Secretary of War).
- President Grover Cleveland (Democrat) was the subject of controversy during the 1884 presidential race when news broke that he had paid child support to the widowed Maria Bertha Halpin for her son, Oscar Folsom Cleveland (b. 1874). Halpin accused Cleveland of raping and impregnating her; she also accused him of institutionalizing her against her will to gain control of their child. Cleveland's acknowledgment of Oscar's paternity ameliorated the political situation. Still, the controversy prompted Cleveland's opponents to adopt the chant, "Ma, ma, where's my pa?" After Cleveland won the election, the chant was answered with "Gone to the White House, ha, ha, ha!" (1884)
- In 1872, an anonymous letter-writer sent James W. Harold a message accusing Andrew Johnson, former U.S. president and candidate for the House of Representatives, of an affair with Harold's wife, Emily Wright Harold. Emily Harold committed suicide within days. A libel trial charged and acquitted one "R.C. Horn" of having sent the letter.
- Representative (Rep.) William Campbell Preston Breckinridge of Kentucky (Democrat) was sued by his former mistress, Madeleine Pollard, for breach of promise after Breckinridge's wife died and he failed to marry Pollard. Breckinridge was not reelected. (1894)
- George Q. Cannon, Utah's territorial congressional delegate (Democrat), was refused his seat in Congress due to his arrest for unlawful cohabitation (polygamy). He served nearly six months in prison. (1888)

== 1900–1969 ==
- Sen. Arthur Brown of Utah (Republican), founder of the Utah State Republican Party, was shot dead by his longtime mistress, Anne Maddison Bradley, for having a second mistress. Bradley, who had two children by Brown, was tried but acquitted on a defense of temporary insanity. (1906)
- President Woodrow Wilson (Democrat) allegedly had an affair with Mary Allen Hulbert, whom he met in 1907 when he was president of Princeton University.
- President Warren G. Harding (Republican) reportedly had affairs with Carrie Phillips and Nan Britton during the 1910s and early 1920s before he died in 1923. Britton claimed in her best-selling 1927 book, The President's Daughter, that Harding had fathered her daughter Elizabeth while he was a Senator. In August 2015, genetic tests confirmed Harding as the father of Elizabeth.
- Sen. David I. Walsh of Massachusetts (Democrat) was accused of visiting a male brothel in Brooklyn frequented by Nazi spies in 1942.
- President Franklin D. Roosevelt (Democrat) had multiple extramarital affairs from 1914 until his death in 1945.
- During the Lavender Scare of the 1950s, Sen. Styles Bridges of New Hampshire (Republican) threatened to expose the son of Wyoming Sen. Lester Hunt (Democrat) unless Hunt resigned from the Senate, which would give the Republicans a Senate majority. Hunt refused but did not seek re-election and later shot himself. (1954)
- President John F. Kennedy (Democrat) has been linked to many extramarital affairs, including allegations of involvement with Marilyn Monroe and Judith Campbell Exner. He engaged in an affair with intern Mimi Alford in 1962 and 1963.
- President Lyndon B. Johnson (Democrat) had extramarital affairs with multiple women, in particular with Alice Marsh (née Glass), who assisted him politically. His affair with Madeleine Duncan Brown allegedly resulted in a son.
- U.S. Supreme Court Justice William O. Douglas (Democrat) allegedly pursued other women while married to his third wife. He reportedly tried to molest a flight attendant in his judicial chambers. Attempted impeachment, based on his moral character, failed when the House Judiciary Committee found insufficient grounds. (1960s)

== 1970–1979 ==
- Rep. Wilbur Mills of Arkansas (Democrat) was found intoxicated with stripper Fanne Foxe. He was re-elected but resigned from his position as Chairman of the United States House Committee on Ways and Means in 1974 after giving an intoxicated press conference from Foxe's burlesque house dressing room.
- Rep. Allan Howe of Utah (Democrat) was arrested in 1976 for soliciting two police officers posing as prostitutes.
- Rep. Wayne Hays of Ohio (Democrat) ruined his career in a 1976 sex scandal. The Washington Post reported that Elizabeth Ray had been on the payroll of a committee run by Hays for two years as a clerk-secretary, when in fact her job was providing sexual favors to Hays. Ray admitted, "I can't type, I can't file, I can't even answer the phone."
- Rep. Fred Richmond of New York (Democrat) was charged in 1978 with soliciting sex from a 16-year-old boy. Charges were dropped after Richmond submitted to counseling.
- Rep. Robert L. Leggett of California (Democrat) acknowledged that he fathered two illegitimate children with a congressional secretary, whom he supported financially. He also had an affair with a female aide to Speaker Carl Albert. (1976)
- Rep. Joseph P. Wyatt Jr. of Texas (Democrat) was arrested on charges of homosexual offenses in 1979.
- Rep. John Andrew Young of Texas (Democrat) allegedly forced a female staffer to have sex with him to keep her job. Young referred to the charge as "poppycock". His wife committed suicide the following year, and Young lost his next primary election. (1976)

== 1980–1989 ==
- Rep. Robert Bauman of Maryland (Republican) was charged with attempting to solicit sex from a 16-year-old male prostitute. After Bauman completed an alcoholism rehabilitation program, the charges were dropped. Bauman apologized to voters for his indiscretions but was defeated for re-election. (1980)
- Rep. Jon Hinson of Mississippi (Republican) resigned in 1981 after being charged with attempted sodomy for performing oral sex on a male employee of the Library of Congress.
- Rep. Thomas Evans of Delaware (Republican) went golfing in Florida with nude model and lobbyist Paula Parkinson, who later suggested that her lobbying techniques had been "unusually tactile". Though Evans apologized for any appearance of impropriety, he was voted out of office in 1982. Future Vice-president Dan Quayle and Congressman Tom Railsback also went on the golf trip but were not implicated in the scandal; Marilyn Quayle said it was common knowledge that her husband would "rather play golf than have sex any day." (1981)
- Rep. John G. Schmitz of California (Republican), the leader of the ultra-conservative John Birch Society, admitted to having a second family but refused to accept or support the two children he fathered, those children becoming wards of the state in 1982. In 1997, his daughter Mary Kay Letourneau was convicted of raping a 12-year-old male student of hers.
- Rep. Dan Crane of Illinois (Republican) and Rep. Gerry Studds of Massachusetts (Democrat) were both convicted on 20 July 1983 in the Congressional Page sex scandal for having sex with a 17-year-old congressional page.
- Fmr. Sen. Gary Hart of Colorado (Democrat) was the front-runner for the 1988 Democratic presidential nomination before being photographed with model Donna Rice on a boat named Monkey Business during a trip to the Bahamas, raising questions of infidelity. His popularity plummeted, and he soon dropped out of the race. Thirty years later, it was alleged that the photo had been staged in a set-up by the rival campaign of George H. W. Bush. (1987)
- Rep. Ernie Konnyu of California (Republican) was accused by multiple women of sexual harassment. In one instance, he asked a female aide to move her name tag because it drew attention to her breasts, about which he later said, "she is not exactly heavily stacked, OK?” He also reportedly touched the knee of lobbyist Polly Minor during a lunch, which caused a scene. Republican leaders, already unhappy with Konnyu's temperament, found a new candidate in Stanford professor Tom Campbell, who defeated Konnyu in the next election. (1987)
- Rep. Donald "Buz" Lukens of Ohio (Republican) was convicted of contributing to the delinquency of a minor for having sex with a 16-year-old girl. He was sentenced to 30 days in jail and fined $500. (1989)
- Rep. Barney Frank of Massachusetts (Democrat) was reprimanded by the House in 1987 for "fixing" 33 parking tickets for Steve Gobie, a male escort who lived with Frank. Gobie claimed to have conducted an escort service from Frank's apartment without Frank's knowledge.
- Rep. Gus Savage of Illinois (Democrat) was accused of trying to force himself on a female Peace Corps worker while in Zaire in 1989. No action was taken by the House Ethics Committee after Savage apologized to his victim.

== 1990–1999 ==
- Rep. Arlan Stangeland of Minnesota (Republican) lost his campaign for re-election in 1990, mainly because of a scandal in which he made several hundred long-distance phone calls on his House credit card to a female lobbyist in Virginia. He admitted making the calls but denied having a romantic relationship with the woman. He subsequently retired from politics.
- Sen. Charles S. Robb of Virginia (Democrat), while married to Lynda Bird Johnson, acknowledged drinking champagne and having a nude massage with Miss Virginia, Tai Collins. Robb denied an affair but admitted to an "indiscreet friendship", while Collins claimed that they had an 18-month affair. Soon after, Collins appeared nude in Playboy. (1991)
- Sen. Brock Adams of Washington (Democrat) was accused by eight women of committing acts of sexual misconduct, ranging from sexual harassment to rape. Adams denied the accusations, and there was no criminal prosecution. He did not run for re-election. (1992)
- Rep. Ken Calvert of California (Republican) was involved with a prostitute in 1993 but claimed that no money was involved, and he was not arrested. Calvert apologized several months later, saying, "My conduct that evening was inappropriate.... it violated the values of the person I strive to be."
- Rep. Austin J. Murphy of Pennsylvania (Democrat) acknowledged that he fathered a child out of wedlock after a political opponent came forward with a video of Murphy leaving the home of his mistress. (1994)
- Sen. Robert Packwood of Oregon (Republican) resigned from office in 1995 after 29 women came forward with claims of sexual harassment, abuse, and assault. His denials of wrongdoing were eventually contradicted by his diaries boasting of his sexual conquests.
- Rep. Mel Reynolds of Illinois (Democrat) resigned from Congress in 1995 after a conviction for statutory rape. In August 1994, he was indicted for sexual assault and criminal sexual abuse for engaging in a sexual relationship with a 16-year-old campaign volunteer that began during the 1992 campaign. Despite the charges, he continued his campaign, and was re-elected that November with no opposition. Reynolds initially denied the charges, which he claimed were racially motivated. On 22 August 1995, he was convicted on 12 counts of sexual assault, obstruction of justice, and solicitation of child pornography. He resigned his seat on 1 October 1995.
- Sen. Strom Thurmond of South Carolina (then Republican) was accused by fellow Senator Patty Murray of sexual harassment in 1996. Multiple women had claimed that Thurmond was often guilty of fondling or attempting to fondle women in Senate elevators. Female Senate staffers noted that Thurmond was on an informal list warning women of male Senators considered to be repeat offenders. Additionally, posthumously Thurmond's family acknowledged that, despite being a noted segregationist, before his time in office he fathered a child, Essie Mae Washington-Williams, with a 16-year-old African American employee in 1925. (1996)
- Rep. Bob Barr of Georgia (Republican) had an affair while married to his second wife. Barr was the first lawmaker in either chamber to call for Clinton's resignation due to the Lewinsky scandal. Barr lost a primary challenge less than three years after the impeachment proceedings. (1998)
- Rep. Dan Burton of Indiana (Republican) admitted to fathering a child with a former state employee in 1983. In 1998, Vanity Fair printed an article detailing Burton's affair; Burton admitted to the affair before the issue's publication. In 1995, speaking about the sex scandals of Robert Packwood and Bill Clinton, Burton had stated that no government official "should be allowed to get away with these alleged sexual improprieties." (1998)
- Rep. Robert Livingston of Louisiana (Republican) called for the resignation of Bill Clinton in 1998, after which news of Livingston's own extramarital affairs was leaked. His wife pressed him to resign and to urge Clinton to resign.
- Rep. Newt Gingrich of Georgia (Republican), leader of the Republican Revolution of 1994, resigned from the House after admitting in 1998 to having had an affair with a staffer while he was married to his second wife. During his affair, Gingrich was leading the impeachment of Bill Clinton for perjury regarding the latter's affair with Monica Lewinsky.
- President Bill Clinton (Democrat) was alleged in 1998 to have had oral sex with White House intern Monica Lewinsky in the Oval Office. He declared on TV on 26 January 1998, "I did not have sexual relations with that woman, Miss Lewinsky." The scandal led to impeachment by the House for perjury after lying about the affair under oath. He was acquitted in the Senate by a vote of 55–45. The state of Arkansas suspended Clinton's law license for five years. In 1998, Clinton also admitted to an extramarital affair with Gennifer Flowers.

== 2000–2009 ==
- Rep. Gary Condit of California (Democrat) had an affair with 23-year-old intern Chandra Levy, which was exposed after Levy disappeared. Her body was found a year later. The murder of Chandra Levy remains unsolved.
- Rep. Ed Schrock of Virginia (Republican) announced that he would terminate his 2004 attempt for a third term in Congress after allegedly being caught on tape soliciting sex with men, despite having aggressively opposed various gay-rights issues in Congress, such as same-sex marriage and gays in the military.
- Rep. Bob Filner of California (Democrat) was accused by fellow Representative Diana DeGette of sexually assaulting her in a Capitol Hill elevator. Filner later became Mayor of San Diego, and was forced to resign from that office after numerous women accused him of sexual harassment.
- Rep. Steven C. LaTourette of Ohio (Republican) had a long-term extramarital affair with his chief of staff, Jennifer Laptook. He married Laptook after divorcing his previous wife. (2003)
- Rep. Don Sherwood of Pennsylvania (Republican) failed to win re-election following revelations of a five-year extramarital affair with Cynthia Ore, who accused him of physically abusing her. (2004)
- Rep. Mark Foley of Florida (Republican) resigned his House seat when accused of sending sexually explicit e-mails to underage male congressional pages. He was replaced by Tim Mahoney. (2006)
- Rep. Jim Gibbons of Nevada (Republican) was campaigning for governor when he walked waitress Chrissy Mazzeo to her car. She claimed he threw her against a wall and threatened to assault her sexually. He claimed she tripped, and he caught her. The civil lawsuit was settled with the payment of $50,000 to Mazzeo. Six weeks later, he was elected governor. (2006)
- Sen. David Vitter of Louisiana (Republican) took over the seat of former Rep. Robert Livingston, who resigned in 1999 following revelations of an extramarital affair. At the time, Vitter stated, "I think Livingston's stepping down makes a compelling argument that (Bill) Clinton should resign as well." Vitter's name was then discovered in the address book of Deborah Jeane Palfrey (the "D.C. Madam"). (2007)
- Deputy Secretary of State Randall L. Tobias (Republican) resigned on 27 April 2007, after confirming that he had been a customer of Deborah Jeane Palfrey (the "D.C. Madam"). As the former "AIDS Czar" appointed by George W. Bush, Tobias had stated that U.S. funds should be denied to countries that permitted prostitution.
- Sen. Larry Craig of Idaho (Republican) was arrested on 11 June 2007 and charged with lewd conduct arising from his behavior in a men's restroom at the Minneapolis–Saint Paul International Airport. Craig pleaded guilty to the lesser charge of disorderly conduct; he later unsuccessfully sought to withdraw his guilty plea. He announced his resignation on 1 September 2007 but changed his mind. He did not seek re-election in 2008.
- Rep. Tim Mahoney of Florida (Democrat) was elected to the seat of Rep. Mark Foley, who had resigned following sexual harassment charges. Mahoney ran on a campaign promise to make "a world that is safer, more moral." In October 2008, he admitted placing his mistress on his staff and then firing her, telling her, "You work at my pleasure." He also admitted to other affairs.
- Rep. Vito Fossella of New York (Republican) was arrested for drunken driving in 2008. Under questioning, the married Congressman and father of three admitted to an affair with Laura Fay that produced a daughter.
- Sen. John Edwards of North Carolina (Democrat) admitted to an extramarital affair with actress and film producer Rielle Hunter, which produced a child. The scandal seriously undercut his 2008 presidential campaign.
- Sen. John Ensign of Nevada (Republican) resigned his position as chairman of the Senate Republican Policy Committee on 16 June 2009, after admitting an affair with the wife of a close friend, both of whom were working on his campaign. In 2011, while under investigation, he resigned his Senate seat.
- Rep. Chip Pickering of Mississippi (Republican) lost his marriage and political career after an extramarital affair, according to the alienation of affection lawsuit that his wife filed on 16 July 2009 against his alleged mistress.
- Gov. Mark Sanford of South Carolina (Republican) disappeared from the state for nearly a week in June 2009. After returning, Sanford publicly revealed that he had engaged in an extramarital affair. Sanford had led his staff to believe that he was going hiking on the Appalachian Trail but went to visit his mistress, Maria Belén Chapur, in Argentina. The scandal led to his censure by the South Carolina General Assembly and his resignation as chair of the Republican Governors Association. However, Sanford completed his second term as governor.

== 2010–2019 ==
- Rep. Eric Massa of New York (Democrat) resigned in 2010 to avoid an ethics investigation into his admitted groping and tickling of multiple male staffers. He later stated on Fox News, "Not only did I grope [a staffer], I tickled him until he couldn't breathe."
- Rep. Mark Souder of Indiana (Republican), a staunch advocate of abstinence and family values, resigned in 2010 to avoid an ethics investigation into his admitted extramarital affair with a female staffer.
- Rep. Chris Lee of New York (Republican) resigned in 2011 after a news report stated that he had sent flirtatious emails and a shirtless picture of himself flexing his muscles to a woman via Craigslist using his official Congressional email. Lee apologizing, stating, "I regret the harm my actions have caused my family, staff, and constituents.... I have made profound mistakes and promise to work as hard as possible to seek their forgiveness."
- Rep. Anthony Weiner of New York (Democrat) admitted to sending sexually explicit photos of himself to several women through his Twitter account. He resigned from Congress on 16 June 2011, but he continued sexting. On 6 November 2017, Weiner began serving a 21-month sentence for sexting a 15-year-old girl.
- Rep. Scott DesJarlais of Tennessee (Republican) admitted under oath to at least six affairs, including two experiences with his patients and staffers, while he was a physician at Grandview Medical Center in Jasper, TN. While running on a pro-life political platform, DesJarlais coerced his ex-wife into having two abortions and tried to persuade a mistress, who was also his patient, into an abortion as well. (2011)
- Rep. David Wu of Oregon (Democrat) resigned from the House on 26 July 2011 after being accused of making unwanted sexual advances toward a fundraiser's daughter.
- Rep. Eric Swalwell of California (Democrat) allegedly had an illicit affair with Chinese spy Christine Fang during his first marriage to Rochelle Swalwell, resulting in the couple's divorce. As a result of these allegations, House Minority Leader Kevin McCarthy unsuccessfully moved to remove Swalwell from his seat on the House Intelligence Committee. Upon becoming House Speaker in the 118th Congress, Kevin McCarthy refused to reappoint Swalwell to the House Intelligence Committee.
- Sen. Pete Domenici of New Mexico (Republican) confessed in 2013 that he had fathered a son, Adam Laxalt, outside of his marriage in 1978. Laxalt's mother, Michelle Laxalt, is the daughter of Sen. Paul Laxalt and a prominent Republican lobbyist.
- Rep. Vance McAllister of Louisiana (Republican), although married and the father of five, was caught on a surveillance camera kissing a married staffer in 2014. Several prominent Republicans asked McAllister to resign. McAllister did not resign, but he did not seek re-election. McCallister apologized, saying, "There's no doubt I've fallen short, and I'm asking for forgiveness. I'm asking for forgiveness from God, my wife, my kids, my staff, and my constituents who elected me to serve."
- Rep. Blake Farenthold of Texas (Republican) was reported to have paid $84,000 of taxpayer money via the House Office of Compliance to settle a sexual harassment complaint from a former staffer. Farenthold's former communications director, Lauren Greene, sued the congressman in December 2014, and a settlement was reached in 2015. The identity of Farenthold was made public in 2017. This was the first documented case of taxpayer funds being used to settle sexual harassment complaints against a member of Congress.
- Rep. Dennis Hastert of Illinois (Republican), former Speaker of the United States House of Representatives, pled guilty in 2015 to structuring bank withdrawals to conceal misconduct by Hastert against an unnamed individual. At a sentencing hearing in October 2015, Hastert admitted that he had sexually abused boys while he worked as a high school wrestling coach decades earlier.
- President Donald Trump (Republican) was accused of sexual assault by 25 women during the 2016 election, and he denied the allegations. (See Donald Trump sexual misconduct allegations.) The allegations arose after The Washington Post released a 2005 video of Trump recorded by Access Hollywood, in which he allegedly bragged about groping women. Trump himself renewed the controversy a year later by claiming that the video was fake, to which Access Hollywood replied, "Let us make this clear—the tape is genuine. Remember, his excuse at the time was 'locker-room talk.' He said every one of those words." The first reports of an alleged 2006 affair between Donald Trump and adult film star Stormy Daniels were published in October 2011 by the blog The Dirty and the magazine Life & Style (see Stormy Daniels–Donald Trump scandal).
- Rep. Tim Murphy of Pennsylvania (Republican) had an extramarital affair with 32-year-old Shannon Edwards. The self-identified "pro-life" Murphy asked Edwards to have an abortion after she became pregnant. The information was revealed as part of Edwards's divorce proceedings and was published by the Pittsburgh Post-Gazette. Murphy resigned his seat in Congress. (2016)
- Sen. Al Franken of Minnesota (Democrat) was accused in 2017 by radio newscaster Leeann Tweeden of forcibly kissing her as part of a skit and later pretending to grope her without her consent during a U.S.O. tour in 2006. Tweeden produced photo evidence of the pretend grope, taken when Tweeden was asleep. Franken was subsequently accused of groping and unwanted kissing by seven other women. Franken admitted to some allegations, apologized, and ultimately resigned. Later Franken said he regretted resigning and felt that he was denied due process in the Senate. He also questioned the veracity of his female accusers.
- Rep. Joe Barton of Texas (Republican) acknowledged that he took and emailed nude photos of himself in 2015, following leaks of the photos in November 2017. He decided not to seek re-election in 2018.
- Rep. Ruben Kihuen of Nevada (Democrat) withdrew from his re-election race in December 2017 after three women, including his former finance director, accused him of sexual assault.
- Rep. John Conyers Jr. of Michigan (Democrat) was accused of unwanted sexual advances by a former staffer in 2017. A woman who had settled a sexual harassment claim against him stated that the lawmaker had "violated" her body, repeatedly propositioned her for sex, and asked her to touch his genitals. Conyers Jr. resigned.
- Rep. Trent Franks of Arizona (Republican) was investigated in 2017 by the House Ethics Commission about allegations of improper conduct. Before the study concluded, Franks abruptly resigned.
- Rep. Pat Meehan of Pennsylvania (Republican) used taxpayer funds to settle a sexual harassment claim levied by a female staffer, as revealed in January 2018. Meehan resigned on 27 April 2018, stating that he would repay the taxpayer money used to settle the suit.
- Rep. Jim Jordan of Ohio (Republican) was accused of covering up and failing to report sexual abuse of minors while assistant coach for the Ohio State University wrestling team from 1987 to 1995. The team physician abused multiple victims during Jordan's tenure. On 12 February 2020, a former team member asserted that Jordan (was) "repeatedly crying and begging him not to corroborate accounts of sexual abuse against the university’s wrestling team doctor that occurred when Jordan was a coach."
- Roy S. Moore of Alabama, a Republican candidate for the Senate, was accused by nine women of sexual contact and assault when the women were teenage girls in the 1980s. Moore denied the allegations but lost the election. (2017)
- Tony Tooke, Chief of the US Forest Service, resigned in 2018 after sexual harassment and retaliation accusations.
- Rep. Katie Hill of California (Democrat) was alleged to have engaged in an extramarital affair with her male legislative director, Graham Kelly, and a 22-year-old female staffer, prior to her election to Congress. In October 2019, news reports indicated that the House Ethics Commission was investigating allegations against Hill. Hill and her husband were estranged by this point, and he engaged in revenge porn against her. She later resigned as a result of the allegations.

== 2020–present ==
- Rep. Madison Cawthorn of North Carolina (Republican) was accused in August 2020, by several women, of sexually aggressive behavior, sexual misconduct, and sexual assault. These allegations arose once more in February 2021 after a BuzzFeed News investigation into Cawthorn's college activities. The reporters found 20 witnesses to Cawthorn's harassment and interviewed four women who claimed he had harassed them. Cawthorn allegedly recklessly drove women in his car to remote areas off campus while asking them sexual questions, calling these journeys "fun drives". Two resident assistants said they warned women to avoid Cawthorn. A male acquaintance said that Cawthorn bragged about pulling Brett Vaughn of Greenland, AR, and a woman into his lap and putting a finger between her legs. On May 4, 2022, a sex tape of Cawthorn began circulating online, showing a naked Cawthorn in bed with another man, thrusting his genitals in the man's face. Cawthorn acknowledged the film's veracity but said the video was made "years ago" when he was "being crass with a friend". He was also accused of insider trading, appearing in a nude video, appearing in women's lingerie and trying to bring a loaded gun onto an airplane, accusations of orgies and conduct “not becoming of a congressman.” He lost the next Republican nomination. (2022)
- North Carolina candidate Cal Cunningham (Democrat) for the US Senate, lost the 2020 election to incumbent Thom Tillis after information leaked in October 2020 that Cunningham had sent sexually suggestive text messages to a married California woman.
- Florida Rep. Matt Gaetz (Republican) allegedly had a sexual relationship with a 17-year-old girl in 2019. In March 2021, The New York Times reported that Gaetz was being investigated by the Department of Justice (DOJ). Investigators examined whether he had violated federal sex trafficking laws. Gaetz denied any wrongdoing and claimed that he and his family were "victims of an organized criminal extortion involving a former DOJ official seeking $25 million." As of 2023, Gaetz has not been charged.
- New York Rep. Tom Reed (Republican) was accused by a lobbyist of sexual harassment on 19 March 2021 for an incident at a bar. In a statement made on 21 March 2021, he apologized to his accuser and said he would not seek re-election. On 10 May 2022, he announced his resignation on the House floor effective immediately.
- Texas Rep. Van Taylor (Republican), allegedly had an extramarital affair with counter-extremism activist Tania Joya in 2020 and 2021, per Joya's claims in February 2022. Taylor won a plurality but not a majority in the primary and faced a runoff election before suspending his campaign and later formally withdrawing from the runoff.
- Second presidency, Donald Trump (Republican) was publicly accused by Elon Musk of being listed in the client list of convicted child sex offender Jeffrey Epstein. Despite having previously promised to release the files, Trump declared that the files did not actually exist. This was met with widespread skepticism from both the left and right, as well as speculation that the files were being covered up because they included information that could potentially incriminate Trump in sex crimes. The Justice Department confirmed in May 2025 that Trump was mentioned by name multiple times in the Epstein files. In November 2025, a set of emails from Epstein were released, one of which suggested that Epstein believed that Trump knew more about his abuse than Trump had acknowledged. In the email, Epstein states: "Of course he knew about the girls as he asked Ghislaine to stop." In another email, Epstein stated that Trump had "spent hours" with one of the victims. The victim was identified by Committee Republicans as Virginia Giuffre, who had previously said that she had not witnessed Trump engaging in the sexual abuse of minors. An NPR investigation found that the Justice Department withheld and removed dozens of pages from the public Epstein files database, including FBI interview records tied to two women who accused President Trump of sexual abuse when they were minors.
- California Rep. Eric Swalwell (Democrat) resigned in April 2026 from his Congressional seat and dropped his bid to become Governor of California after being accused of rape by two women and of having sexually harassed three others, including sending them unsolicited photographs of his penis.
- Nominee for the U.S. Senate in Maine Graham Platner (Democratic) oyster farmer, was accused by his partner Jenny Racicot, of sexual assault. An article by Politico verified that she previously disclosed this to her former boyfriend and therapist. She alleged that an intoxicated Platner forced himself onto her despite her repeatedly asking him to stop. Platner repeatedly denied the allegations.. Nevertheless, several groups and officials called on Platner to leave the race, included former supporters such as Ro Khanna and Bernie Sanders, as well as the Maine Democratic Party. Platner withdrew from the race on July 8, 2026. and was replaced by Troy Jackson.
- Texas US Rep. Tony Gonzales (Republican) confessed to an affair with a staffer who later killed herself. Under party pressure he resigned. (2026)

== See also ==
- List of federal political scandals in the United States
- Newport sex scandal, involving behavior by U.S. Navy sailors in 1919
- 2017–18 United States political sexual scandals

Federal politicians:

- Andrew Johnson and slavery § Paternity of Dolly Johnson's children
- Donald Trump sexual misconduct allegations
- Bill Clinton sexual misconduct allegations
- List of American federal politicians convicted of crimes
- List of United States senators expelled or censured
- List of United States representatives expelled, censured, or reprimanded

State and local politics:

- List of American state and local politicians convicted of crimes
