= List of United States senators expelled or censured =

The United States Constitution gives the Senate the power to expel any member by a two-thirds vote. This is distinct from the power over impeachment trials and convictions that the Senate has over executive and judicial federal officials: the Senate ruled in 1798 that senators could not be impeached, but only expelled, while debating the impeachment trial of William Blount, who had already been expelled. Expulsion has not occurred since the Civil War.

Censure, a lesser punishment which represents a formal statement of disapproval, has been more common since the start of the 20th century. Although censure carries no formal punishment, only one senator (Benjamin R. Tillman) of the nine to be censured has ever been re-elected. Unlike the House of Representatives, which also disciplines by reprimand, a censure is the weakest form of discipline the Senate issues.

== Expelled senators ==
Year	Senator	Party	State	Reason
1797	William Blount	Democratic-Republican	Tennessee	Treason and conspiracy to incite the Creek and Cherokee Indians to assist Great Britain in invading the Spanish territory of West Florida.
1861	James M. Mason	Democratic	Virginia	Supporting Confederate rebellion; Sebastian's expulsion was posthumously reversed in 1877.
1861	Robert M. T. Hunter	Democratic	Virginia	Supporting Confederate rebellion; Sebastian's expulsion was posthumously reversed in 1877.
1861	Thomas Lanier Clingman	Democratic	North Carolina	Supporting Confederate rebellion; Sebastian's expulsion was posthumously reversed in 1877.
1861	Thomas Bragg	Democratic	North Carolina	Supporting Confederate rebellion; Sebastian's expulsion was posthumously reversed in 1877.
1861	James Chesnut Jr.	Democratic	South Carolina	Supporting Confederate rebellion; Sebastian's expulsion was posthumously reversed in 1877.
1861	Alfred O. P. Nicholson	Democratic	Tennessee	Supporting Confederate rebellion; Sebastian's expulsion was posthumously reversed in 1877.
1861	William K. Sebastian	Democratic	Arkansas	Supporting Confederate rebellion; Sebastian's expulsion was posthumously reversed in 1877.
1861	Charles B. Mitchel	Democratic	Arkansas	Supporting Confederate rebellion; Sebastian's expulsion was posthumously reversed in 1877.
1861	John Hemphill	Democratic	Texas	Supporting Confederate rebellion; Sebastian's expulsion was posthumously reversed in 1877.
1861	Louis Wigfall	Democratic	Texas	Supporting Confederate rebellion; Sebastian's expulsion was posthumously reversed in 1877.
1861	John C. Breckinridge	Democratic	Kentucky	Supporting Confederate rebellion; Sebastian's expulsion was posthumously reversed in 1877.
1862	Trusten Polk	Democratic	Missouri	Supporting Confederate rebellion; Sebastian's expulsion was posthumously reversed in 1877.
1862	Waldo P. Johnson	Democratic	Missouri	Supporting Confederate rebellion; Sebastian's expulsion was posthumously reversed in 1877.
1862	Jesse D. Bright	Democratic	Indiana	Supporting Confederate rebellion; Sebastian's expulsion was posthumously reversed in 1877.

== Expulsion proceedings not resulting in expulsion ==
Many expulsion proceedings have been begun by the Senate that did not lead to expulsion. In most cases, the expulsion failed to secure the necessary two-thirds vote, in other cases the senator in question resigned while proceedings were taking place, and some proceedings ended when a senator died or his term expired.

Year	Senator	Party	State	Result	Details
1808	John Smith	Democratic-Republican	Ohio	Not expelled	Assisted Aaron Burr's western expedition; resigned two weeks after expulsion failed
1856	Henry Mower Rice	Democratic	Minnesota	Not expelled	Charged with corruption
1862	Lazarus W. Powell	Democratic	Kentucky	Not expelled	Accused of supporting the Confederate rebellion
1862	James F. Simmons	Republican	Rhode Island	Resigned	Charged with corruption
1873	James W. Patterson	Republican	New Hampshire	Term expired	Charged with corruption
1893	William N. Roach	Democratic	North Dakota	Not expelled	Charged with embezzlement; Senate determined that charges were too far in the past
1905	John H. Mitchell	Republican	Oregon	Died during proceedings	Charged with corruption
1906	Joseph R. Burton	Republican	Kansas	Resigned	Convicted (upheld by the Supreme Court) for receiving compensation for intervening with a federal agency
1907	Reed Smoot	Republican	Utah	Not expelled	Senate committee asserted that Smoot, as a Mormon, belonged to a religion incompatible with US law; Senate found 43-27 that this was not relevant
1919	Robert M. La Follette	Republican	Wisconsin	Not expelled	Charged with disloyalty for a speech opposing entry into World War I; Senate found 50-21 that this was not warranted
1922	Truman Handy Newberry	Republican	Michigan	Resigned	Convicted of election fraud (later overturned) for excessive spending in a primary election
1924	Burton K. Wheeler	Democratic	Montana	Not expelled	Indicted for conflict of interest after serving in legal cases to which the United States was a party; exonerated by Senate 56-5
1934	John H. Overton	Democratic	Louisiana	Not expelled	Both investigated for electoral fraud
1934	Huey Long	Democratic	Louisiana	Not expelled	Both investigated for electoral fraud
1942	William Langer	Republican	North Dakota	Not expelled	Charged with corruption and moral turpitude while Governor of North Dakota; full senate voted against expulsion 52-30
1982	Harrison A. Williams	Democratic	New Jersey	Resigned	Convicted of bribery and conspiracy in the Abscam scandal; resigned before a vote by the full Senate
1995	Bob Packwood	Republican	Oregon	Resigned	Charged with sexual misconduct and abuse of power; resigned before Senate vote
2011	John Ensign	Republican	Nevada	Resigned	Charged with financial improprieties stemming from an extramarital affair; resigned before Senate vote

== Censured senators ==
Year	Senator	Party	State	Reason
1811	Timothy Pickering	Federalist	Massachusetts	Reading confidential documents in open Senate session before an injunction of secrecy was removed.
1844	Benjamin Tappan	Democratic	Ohio	Released to the New York Evening Post a copy of President John Tyler's message to the Senate regarding the treaty of annexation between the United States and the Republic of Texas.
1902	Benjamin Tillman	Democratic	South Carolina	Fighting on the Senate floor with each other.
1902	John L. McLaurin	Democratic	South Carolina	Fighting on the Senate floor with each other.
1929	Hiram Bingham III	Republican	Connecticut	Employed Charles Eyanson as a Senate staff member while Eyanson was employed by the Manufacturers Association of Connecticut.
1954	Joseph McCarthy	Republican	Wisconsin	Refusal to cooperate with and verbal abuse of the members of the Subcommittee on Privileges and Elections during a 1952 investigation of his conduct, and of the Select Committee to Study Censure.
1967	Thomas J. Dodd	Democratic	Connecticut	Use of his office to convert campaign funds to his personal benefit, and conduct unbecoming a senator.
1979	Herman Talmadge	Democratic	Georgia	Improper financial conduct, accepting reimbursements for official expenses not incurred, and improper reporting of campaign receipts and expenditures. Talmadge was technically "denounced," rather than censured.
1990	David Durenberger	Republican	Minnesota	Unethical conduct relating to reimbursement of Senate expenses and acceptance of outside payments and gifts.

== See also ==
- Censure in the United States
- List of federal political scandals in the United States
- List of federal political sex scandals in the United States

Federal politicians:

- List of United States representatives expelled, censured, or reprimanded
- List of American federal politicians convicted of crimes

State and local politics:

- List of American state and local politicians convicted of crimes
- List of New York State Legislature members expelled or censured
