= List of 2010s American state and local politicians convicted of crimes =

This list includes American politicians at the state and local levels who have been convicted of felony crimes committed while in office by decade; this list encompasses the 2010s.

At the bottom of the article are links to related articles which deal with politicians who are involved in federal scandals (political and sexual), as well as differentiating among federal, state and local convictions. Also excluded are crimes which occur outside the politician's tenure in office unless they specifically stem from acts during his time of service.

Entries are arranged by date, from most current to less recent, and by state.

== Alabama ==
- State Representative Ed Henry (R) convicted of fraud. (2019)
- State Representative Micky Hammon (R) was convicted of fraud (2017)
- State Representative Oliver Robinson (D) was convicted of bribery. (2017)
- Speaker of the Alabama House of Representatives Mike Hubbard (R) was convicted on 12 of 23 felony charges. (2016)
- State Representative Terry Spicer (D) pleaded guilty to accepting more than $3,000 per month in bribes. (2011)
- Mike Hubbard (R) State Representative and House Speaker was convicted of 12 felony counts of public corruption and ethics violations for soliciting consulting contracts and then benefiting from them.(2016)

== Arizona ==
- State Representative Richard Miranda (D) pleaded guilty to wire fraud and tax evasion. (2012)
- State Representative Ben Arredondo (D) was charged with bribery, fraud and extortion. He was sentenced to 18 months of house arrest. (2012)

== Arkansas ==
- State Senator Jeremy Hutchinson (R) convicted of bribery. (2019)
- State Representative Mickey Gates (R) convicted of failing to file taxes. (2018)
- State Representative Hank Wilkins (D) convicted of bribery. (2018)
- State Senator Jake Files (R) was convicted of fraud. (2018)
- State Representative Jon Woods (R) convicted of bribery. (2018)
- State Representative Eddie Cooper (D) convicted of embezzlement. (2018)
- State Representative Micah Neal (R) was convicted of bribery. (2017)
- State Representative Steven B. Jones (D) convicted of bribery. (2015)
- State Senator Paul Bookout (D) pleaded guilty to mail fraud. (2014)
- State Treasurer Martha Shoffner (D) convicted on the charges of extortion and bribery and sentenced to 30 months. (2014)
- State Representative Hudson Hallum (D) pleaded guilty to voter bribing. (2012)

== California ==
- State Senator Ron Calderon (D), brother of Tom, was convicted of money laundering. (2016)
- State Assemblyman Tom Calderon (D), brother of Ron, was convicted of money laundering. (2016)
- State Senator Leland Yee (D) pleaded guilty to one count of racketeering (2015) and was sentenced to five years in prison. (2016)
- State Senator Roderick Wright (D) was convicted of eight counts of perjury and voter fraud. He was sentenced to 90 days and barred him from ever holding public office again and will be required to perform 1,500 hours of community service and three years' probation under the terms of his conviction. (2014) Wright was pardoned in 2018.
- State Assemblywoman Mary Hayashi (D) was charged with felony grand theft after being caught on video surveillance allegedly shoplifting $2,445 worth of merchandise from San Francisco's Neiman Marcus store. She was sentenced to $180 fine and three years' probation and was ordered to stay more than 50 feet from the store. (2011)

=== Local ===
- District Attorney for Contra Costa County Mark Peterson (R) convicted of perjury. (2017)
- Los Angeles County Sheriff of Los Angeles Lee Baca (R) convicted of obstructing the FBI. (2017)
- Mayor of Gardena Paul Tanaka (R) convicted of civil rights abuses. (2016)
- Mayor of San Diego Bob Filner (D) given three months of house arrest, three years' probation, pleading guilty to state charges of false imprisonment and battery. (2013)
- Los Angeles County Supervisor Mark Ridley-Thomas (D) was found guilty of conspiracy, bribery, and fraud, He was sentenced to 42 months.

== Colorado ==
- State Senator Steve King (R) pleaded guilty to embezzlement of public property and misdemeanor first-degree official misconduct. Sentenced to serve two years' probation and complete 80 hours of useful public service. (2015)
- State Representative Douglas Bruce (R), was convicted on four counts of felony money laundering, attempted improper influence of a public official, and tax fraud. He was sentenced on February 13, 2012, to a total of 180 days in jail, $49,000 in fines, and six months of probation. (2011)
- Secretary of State Scott Gessler (R) was found guilty of violating Colorado's ethics laws by using state money to attend a Republican event in Florida (2012)

== Connecticut ==
- State Representative Victor Cuevas (D) convicted of bank fraud. (2016)
- State Senator Ernie Newton (D) was sentenced to six months in prison for three counts of illegal practices in campaign financing. Newton had also been sentenced to four years for federal charges of accepting a $5,000 bribe, evading taxes and pilfering campaign contributions to pay for personal expenses. (2015)
- State Representative Christina Ayala (D) convicted of election fraud. Given one year suspended. (2014)

=== Local ===
- Mayor of Hartford, Connecticut Eddie Perez (D), was sentenced to eight years, suspended after three years, with three years in prison, to be followed by three years of probation for corruption. (2010)

== Delaware ==
- Eric Bodenweiser (R) Candidate for State Senator pled guilty to committing two acts of unlawful sexual contact. (2012)
- John C. Atkins (R) State Representative arrested for drunk driving and forcibly touching, stalking and non compliance. He was found guilty and served 22 days in jail (2018)

== Florida ==
- State Representative Daisy Baez (D) convicted of perjury. (2017)
- State Representative Erik Fresen (R) convicted of tax evasion. (2017)
- State Representative Dwayne Taylor (D) convicted of fraud. (2017)
- State Representative Reggie Fullwood (D) convicted of fraud. (2016)
- State Senator M. Mandy Dawson (D) convicted of fraud. (2011)
- State Representative David Rivera (R) was found guilty of campaign violations. (2012)

=== Local ===
- Tallahassee Mayor Scott Maddox (D) convicted of corruption. (2019)
- Nick Nicholson (R) Hernando County Commissioner, pled guilty to running a house of prostitution. (2018)

== Georgia ==
- State Representative Tyrone Brooks (D) convicted of tax fraud. (2015)
- Michael Williams (R) State Senator found guilty of making a false police report, perjury and insurance fraud. (2018)

== Idaho ==
- State Senator John McGee (R):
  - Found guilty of drunk driving and auto theft. Sentenced to 6 months in jail. (2013)
  - Found guilty of disturbing the peace, sentenced to 44 days in jail. (2012)
  - Pleaded guilty to probation violation and a disturbing the peace charge related to sexual harassment that had occurred at the Idaho State Capital Building and was jailed for 44 days. (2011) He had previously been arrested for grand theft auto and driving under the influence. McGee pleaded guilty to DUI and was sentenced to 180 days, serving 5 in jail, plus community service, 175 days' probation, plus fines and restitution. (2011)
- Mark Patterson (R) State Representative lied on his concealed carry gun permit. (2014)

== Illinois ==
- State Representative Keith Farnham (D) convicted of distributing child pornography. (2014)
- State Representative Derrick Smith (D) was arrested and convicted of accepting a $7,000 bribe. (2014)
- State Representative Constance A. Howard (D) convicted of mail fraud. (2013)
- State Representative La Shawn Ford (D) convicted of fraud. (2012)
- State Representative Ron Stephens (R) was found guilty of repeated drug abuse and DUI (2010)

=== Local ===
- Alderman of Chicago Willie Cochran (D) convicted of fraud. (2019)
- Chief executive officer of Chicago Public Schools Barbara Byrd-Bennett (D) convicted of bribery. (2015)
- Alderman of Chicago William Beavers (D) convicted of tax fraud. (2013)
- Alderman of Chicago Sandi Jackson (D) pleaded guilty to one count of filing false tax returns. (2013)
- Comptroller and Treasurer of Dixon, Rita Crundwell (R) was sentenced to 19 years and 7 months in prison for fraud, having embezzled $53 million. (2013)
- Alderman of Chicago Isaac Carothers (D) convicted of corruption. (2010)

== Indiana ==
- Secretary of State Charlie White (R) was convicted on 6 of 7 felony charges including perjury, theft and voter fraud. (2012)

=== Local ===
- Mayor of East Chicago George Pabey (D) was convicted by a federal court jury on September 24, 2010, of conspiracy and theft of government funds. (2010)

== Iowa ==
- State Senator Kent Sorenson (R) pleaded guilty of falsely reporting expenditures and obstruction of justice. Sentenced to 15 months in prison. (2014)

== Kansas ==
- State Representative Trent K. LeDoux (R) pleaded guilty to one count of bank fraud. He was sentenced to 18 months in federal prison for defrauding Farmers and Merchants Bank of Colby, Kansas, of more than $460,000. (2014)

=== Local ===
- Rooks County Sheriff Randy Axelson (R) was sentenced to four years and one month in prison after pleading guilty to distribution of methamphetamine. He was arrested in December 2011, charges include distribution of meth within 1000 feet of Stockton High School. (2013)

== Kentucky ==
- State Representative Keith Hall (D) was convicted of bribery and sentenced to seven years in prison. (2016)
- State Representative Ben Waide (R) convicted of campaign violations. (2015)
- Commissioner of Agriculture Richie Farmer (R) was convicted of corruption and sentenced to 27 months in prison. (2014)

== Louisiana ==
- State Representative Girod Jackson, III (D) convicted of tax evasion. (2013)

=== Local ===
- Mayor of New Orleans Ray Nagin (D) was found guilty on 20 counts of bribery and was sentenced to ten years in federal prison. (2014)
- Mayor of Mandeville Eddie Price III (R) was sentenced to 60 months on charges of income tax evasion and corruption. (2010)

== Maine ==
- State Representative Frederick Wintle (R), pleaded guilty to a concealed weapons charge (2012)

== Maryland ==
- State Delegate Tawanna P. Gaines (D) was convicted of wire fraud. (2019)
- State Senator Nathaniel T. Oaks (D) was convicted of corruption and sentenced to 3 1/2 years. (2018)
- State Delegate Will Campos (D) was convicted of bribery. (2018)
- State Delegate Michael L. Vaughn (D) was convicted of bribery. (2018)
- State Delegate Don H. Dwyer Jr. (R) was operating a motorboat when it collided with another vessel injuring five others. Dwyer pleaded guilty, but appealed his 30-day jail sentence. The sentence was ultimately upheld after another incident in which Dwyer was stopped and arrested for a DUI and received an additional 30-day sentence, for a total of 60 days. (2013)
- State Delegate Richard Impallaria was convicted of driving under the influence and was sentenced to two days in prison. (2017)
- State Delegate Tiffany T. Alston (D) was convicted of embezzlement. (2012)

=== Local ===
- Police Commissioner of Baltimore Darryl De Sousa (D) convicted of tax crimes. (2018)
- Anne Arundel County Executive John R. Leopold (R) convicted of misconduct in office. (2013)
- Prince George's County Executive Jack B. Johnson (D) pleaded guilty to extortion and, witness and evidence tampering. He was sentenced to seven years and three months in Butner federal prison in North Carolina. He was also fined $100,000. (2011)
- Prince George's County Councillor Leslie Johnson (D), was sentenced to one year and one day in prison for political corruption. (2011)

== Massachusetts ==
- State Representative Carlos Henriquez (D) was convicted of two counts assault and battery charges and sentenced to 2 1/2 years, with six months to be served in the Middlesex County House of Correction and Jail in Billerica, Massachusetts and the remaining two years to be spent on probation. (2014)
- Speaker of the House Salvatore DiMasi (D) was found guilty of using his position to secure multimillion-dollar state contracts for Cognos, a business intelligence software company, in exchange for kickbacks. (2011)
- State Senator Anthony D. Galluccio (D) was given one year in prison after failing a sobriety test and violating his probation from a previous hit and run accident. (2010)

=== Local ===
- Boston Councillor Chuck Turner (GRP) was expelled from the Boston City Council on December 1, 2010, following his conviction on federal bribery charges. (2010)

== Michigan ==
- State Senator Bert Johnson (D) was convicted of fraud. (2018)
- State Representative Brian Banks (D) was convicted of fraud for filing false financial statements (2017)
- State Senator Virgil Smith, Jr. (D) was convicted of assault and was sentenced to 10 months in jail, five years of probation and not be allowed to hold public office. (2016)
- Justice of the Michigan Supreme Court Diane Hathaway (D) was sentenced to 366 days in prison for criminal mortgage fraud. (2013)
- Chairman of the Michigan Medical Marijuana Board,Rick Johnson (Michigan politician) (R) received over $100,000 in bribes. (2019)

=== Local ===
- Detroit City Councillor Charles Pugh (D) was sentenced to 5 1/2 to 15 years for sex with a teenage boy under the age of 16. (2016)
- Ingham County Prosecutor Stuart Dunnings III (D) convicted of misconduct. (2016)
- Mayor of Detroit Kwame Kilpatrick (D) was sentenced to 18 months to 5 years in prison for violating his probation in 2010. In 2013 he was sentenced to 28 years in prison for federal charges including racketeering and extortion. (2013)

== Mississippi ==
- State Senator Chris Massey (R) was arrested for aggravated assault with a shovel for an argument with two maintenance workers. He was found guilty and given six months' probation. (2016)
- Judge Bobby DeLaughter (D) pleaded guilty of one count of lying to the FBI and was sentenced to 18 months in prison. (2010)

== Missouri ==
- State Representative Steve Webb (D) convicted of theft. (2014)
- State Representative Ray Salva (D) convicted of fraud. (2013)
- Governor of Missouri Roger B. Wilson (D) was fined $2,000 by the Missouri Ethics Commission. In July he was sentenced to two years of probation on the money laundering charge. (2012)
- State Representative Talibdin El-Amin (D) convicted of bribery. (2010)
- Speaker of the Missouri House of Representatives Rod Jetton (R) was arrested for "recklessly causing serious physical injury" to an unnamed woman during sadomasochistic sex and pleaded guilty to misdemeanor assault. He was sentenced to probation and fined. (2010)

=== Local ===
- County Executive of St. Louis County Steve Stenger (D) convicted of bribery. (2019)
- County Executive of Jackson County, Missouri Mike Sanders (D) convicted of fraud. (2018)

== Montana ==
- State Senator Art Wittich (R) was found guilty of campaign violations by coordinating with and taking illegal corporate contributions from, the Western Tradition Partnership. (2016)
- State Representative Joel Boniek (R) was found guilty of "quid pro quo corruption" in taking $9,060 in contributions from the Western Tradition Partnership. (2015)
- State Representative Mike Miller (R) admitted to accepting "unlawful corporate contributions" from Western Tradition Partnership, was found guilty, was fined $4K and agreed not run for public office for four years. (2015)
- State Senator Scott Sales (R) from Bozeman, was accused of accepting unlawful contributions from Western Traditions Partnership. He pled guilty, was fined and forced to "express regret" in settling the accusations. (2014)
- State Representative Tony Belcourt (D) was convicted of four federal corruption charges involving projects on the Rocky Boy Indian Reservation. He was sentenced to 7 1/2 years in prison. (2014)
- State Senator Michael Lange (R) and House Majority Leader was found guilty of drug conspiracy and distribution, and sentenced to 18 years in federal prison. (2014)

== Nevada ==
- State Senator Kelvin Atkinson (D) convicted of fraud. (2019)
- State Assemblyman Steven Brooks (D) convicted of making threats to kill. (2013)

== New Jersey ==
- State Assemblyman Bob Schroeder (R) pled guilty to misconduct and theft (2016)
- State Assemblyman Alberto Coutinho (D) convicted of theft and falsifying records. (2013)
- State Assemblyman Anthony Chiappone (D) jailed for filing false campaign finance reports. (2010)
- State Assemblyman Neil M. Cohen (D) jailed for endangering the welfare of a child by distributing child pornography. (2010)

=== Local ===
- Mayor of Atlantic City Frank Gilliam (D) was convicted of wire fraud (2019)
- Mayor of Trenton Tony F. Mack (D) was indicted for bribery, fraud, extortion and money laundering on February 7, 2014, he was convicted on all counts. (2014) He was sentenced to nearly five years in prison.
- Mayor of Hamilton John Bencivengo (R) was sentenced to 38 months in prison for corruption (2013)
- Mayor of Perth Amboy Joseph Vas (D) and his longtime top mayoral aide, Melvin Ramos, were indicted by a federal grand jury for mail fraud, misapplication of funds, and making false statements to the Federal Election Commission. sentenced to 6 1/2 years for federal corruption. (2011)

== New Hampshire ==
- State Representative John Manning was indicted on two counts of welfare fraud. (2018).
- State Representative Eric Schleien (R) convicted of assault. (2018)
- State Representative Thomas Katsiantonis (D) convicted of tax evasion. (2018)
- State Representative Kyle Tasker (R) was charged with three drug offenses and one count of using a computer to lure a teen. The teen was actually a police officer working undercover. He was sentenced to 3–10 years. (2016)
- State Representative Albert 'Max' Abramson (R) was found guilty of one felony count of reckless conduct for shooting a firearm. He received a suspended jail sentence and was ordered to pay a fine and complete community service. (2012)
- State Representative Gary Wheaton (R) was arrested for a second offense of speeding and driving on a suspended license. He pled guilty to reckless endangerment. (2011)
- State Representative James E. Ryan (D) stole checks from contributors that were intended for the committee to Elect House Democrats. He pled guilty to felony charges of theft, forgery and issuing bad checks. (2010)

== New Mexico ==
- State Senator Phil Griego (D) was convicted of corruption. (2017)
- Secretary of State Dianna Duran (R) was convicted of felony embezzlement and fraud. (2015)

== New York ==
- State Assemblywoman Pamela Harris (D) pleaded guilty to two counts of wire fraud, one count of making false statements to the Federal Emergency Management Agency, and one count of witness tampering. Sentenced to $10,000 restitution, six months in jail followed by three years of supervised release, 400 hours of community service, and restitution of $70,400. (2018)
- Majority Leader of the New York State Senate Dean Skelos (R) convicted of federal corruption. (2018)
- Minority Leader of the State Senate John L. Sampson (D) was convicted of obstructing justice and making false statement. (2015)
- Speaker of the New York State Assembly Sheldon Silver (D) was convicted on federal corruption charges. (2015)
- Majority Leader of the State Senate Malcolm Smith (D) was found guilty in federal court of conspiracy, wire fraud, bribery and extortion for trying to bribe a Republican Party official to let him onto the Republican ballot in the 2013 New York City mayoral race. (2014)
- State Assemblywoman Gabriela Rosa (D) sentenced to a year in jail for entering into a sham marriage to gain U.S. citizenship. (2014)
- State Assemblyman William Boyland Jr. (D) convicted of bribery (2014)
- State Assemblyman Eric Stevenson (D) found guilty of bribery, conspiracy and other related charges. (2014)
- State Assemblyman Nelson Castro (D) convicted of perjury (2013)
- State Senator Shirley Huntley (D) convicted of mail fraud. She was sentenced to one year and a day in prison. (2013)
- Majority Leader of the State Senate Pedro Espada Jr. (D) On May 14, 2012, a federal jury found Espada guilty of embezzling money from federally funded healthcare clinics, after 11 days of deliberation he was sentenced to five years in prison. (2012)
- State Senator Nicholas Spano (R), Spano pleaded guilty to a single count of tax evasion. He was sentenced to 12 to 18 months in federal prison. (2012)
- State Senator Carl Kruger (D) resigned his seat and pleaded guilty to charges of corruption and bribery. (2011)
- New York State Comptroller Alan Hevesi (D), was convicted on charges surrounding a "pay to play" scheme regarding the New York State Pension Fund, and was sentenced to 1–4 years. (2011)
- State Senator Vincent Leibell (R) found guilty of felony bribery, tax evasion, and obstruction of justice charges related to $43,000 in cash kickbacks he took from 2003 to 2006. (2010)
- State Senator Efrain Gonzalez Jr. (D) was convicted of fraud and embezzling $400,000 from the West Bronx Neighborhood Association Inc. and was sentenced to seven years in federal prison (2010)

=== Local ===
- County Executive of Nassau County Ed Mangano (R) convicted of bribery and fraud. (2019)
- New York City Council member Ruben Wills (D) convicted of fraud. (2017)
- New York City Council member Dan Halloran (R) convicted of taking bribes and orchestrating payoffs. Sentenced to 10 years. (2014)
- New York City Council member Larry Seabrook (D) On February 9, 2010, a federal grand jury indicted Seabrook on 13 counts of money laundering, extortion, and fraud. Seabrook was convicted on nine charges. (2012)
- New York City Council Andrew Stein (D) Council President was convicted of tax evasion regarding a Ponzi scheme. (2010)

== North Carolina ==
- State Representative David R. Lewis (R) resigned his seat and was convicted of felony misuse of funds for using $400K of campaign money for his personal use, lying about it and failing to pay taxes on it. (2019)
- State Representative Rodney W. Moore (D) pleaded guilty to making false statements (2019)
- State Senator Fletcher L. Hartsell, Jr. (R) convicted of fraud for misusing campaign contributions and falsely labeling them as expenses. Sentenced to eight months. (2017)
- State Representative Stephen LaRoque (R) was convicted on 12 counts including theft, money laundering and filing false tax returns in 2013. He was granted a retrial following a finding of jury misconduct. LaRoque pleaded guilty to a single charge of theft prior to the second trial and the other counts were dismissed. (2015)
- State Representative Deb McManus (D) resigned her State House seat and pleaded guilty to a tax charge. (2014)
- Governor Mike Easley (D) was convicted of a federal campaign law felony. (2010)

=== Local ===
- Mayor of Charlotte Patrick Cannon (D) charged with accepting bribes. (2014)
- Mayor of High Point Bernita Sims (D) convicted of a worthless check charge. (2014)

== Ohio ==
- State Representative Steve Kraus (R) convicted of a fifth-degree felony. (2015)
- State Representative Peter Beck (R) convicted of perjury. (2015)
- State Representative Clayton Luckie (D) pleaded guilty to money laundering, grand theft, and six counts of election falsification. (2013)
- State Representative W. Carlton Weddington (D) was convicted on bribery charges and sentenced to three years in prison. (2012)

=== Local ===
- Cuyahoga County Common Pleas Judge Lance Mason (D) convicted of domestic abuse and assault. He was sentenced to two years in prison. (2015)

== Oklahoma ==
- State Senator Ralph Shortey (R) pleaded guilty to child sex trafficking. (2018)
- State Senator Kyle Loveless (R) was sentenced to three years of probation and restitution after pleading guilty to embezzling campaign funds. (2017)
- State Representative Gus Blackwell (R) was accused of perjury and embezzlement for using both state funds and campaign funds to pay for the same trips. In a plea bargain he pled guilty and agreed to pay restitution. (2017)
- State Representative Rick Brinkley (R) was convicted of fraud. (2015)
- State Senator Debbe Leftwich (D) was found guilty of bribery in connection with the 2010 Oklahoma political corruption investigation. (2013)
- State Representative Randy Terrill (R) was found guilty of bribery in connection with the 2010 Oklahoma political corruption investigation. Terrill was sentenced to one year in prison. (2013)
- President pro tempore of the Oklahoma Senate Mike Morgan (D) was found guilty of accepting $12,000 in bribes (2012)

== Pennsylvania ==
- State Representative Movita Johnson-Harrell (D) convicted of felony theft. (2019)
- State Representative Vanessa L. Brown (D) convicted of bribery. (2018)
- Treasurer of Pennsylvania Barbara Hafer (D) convicted of lying to the FBI. (2017)
- Attorney General of Pennsylvania Kathleen Kane (D) was convicted of perjury. (2016)
- State Representative Leslie Acosta (D) convicted of conspiracy to commit money laundering. (2016)
- State Representative Michelle Brownlee (D) was convicted of a conflict of interest. (2015)
- State Representative Harold James (D) was convicted of corruption. (2015)
- State Representative Ronald Waters (D) was convicted of bribery. (2015)
- Treasurer of Pennsylvania Rob McCord (D) pleaded guilty to two counts of extortion. (2015)
- State Representative Jose Miranda (D) was convicted of a felony ethics violation. (2015)
- Turnpike Commission CEO Joe Brimmeier (D) pleaded guilty to felony conflict of interest charges. (2014)
- Turnpike Commission chief operating officer George Hatalowich (D) pleaded guilty to felony conflict of interest charges. (2014)
- Pennsylvania Supreme Court Justice Joan Orie Melvin (R) was convicted in February 2013, on six of seven corruption charges including theft of services, criminal conspiracy, and misappropriation of state property. (2013)
- State Senator and Democratic Minority Floor Leader of the Pennsylvania Senate Bob Mellow (D) pleaded guilty to using Senate staffers for campaigns. (2012)
- State Senator and Republican Majority Whip Jane Orie (R) was convicted in March 2012, of 14 counts of forgery, conflict of interest and theft of services, which included five felonies. (2012)
- Secretary of Revenue of Pennsylvania Stephen Stetler (D) convicted of illegally using state resources. (2012)
- State Representative Brett Feese (R) sentenced to 4 to 12 years in state prison, an additional 2 years of probation, a $25,000 fine, and $1 million in restitution for his role in the Computergate state government corruption scandal. (2011)
- State Representative John M. Perzel (R), pleaded guilty to eight criminal charges, including two counts of conflict of interest, two counts of theft, and four counts of conspiracy, concerning a scheme to spend millions of taxpayer dollars on computer technology from Aristotle, Inc. for the benefit of Republican political campaigns. (2011)

=== Local ===
- Sheriff of Philadelphia John Green (D) convicted of bribery. (2019)
- Assistant City solicitor, Allentown Dale Wiles convicted of conspiracy to commit mail and wire fraud. (2018)
- Mayor of Reading Vaughn Spencer (D) convicted of corruption, bribery, wire fraud and conspiracy. (2018)
- Upland Borough City Councilman Edward M. Mitchell (R) convicted of bribery, conspiracy, theft by deception, and restricted activities. (2018)
- Mayor of Allentown Ed Pawlowski (D) convicted of corruption. (2018)
- District Attorney of Philadelphia R. Seth Williams (D) convicted of bribery. (2017)
- Mayor of Harrisburg Steven R. Reed (D) pleaded guilty to theft of public funds. (2017)
- Tax collector, York County Melissa Ann Arnold convicted of theft of public funds. (2015)
- Tax collector, Delaware County, Robert Henry Park (R) pleaded guilty to theft. (2014)
- Tax collector, Berks County, Jodie Mae Keller pleaded guilty to two counts of theft. (2013)

== Rhode Island ==
- State Senator James Doyle II (D) from the 8th district, was being investigated for a check kiting scheme to defraud three local banks of more than $74 million. He was charged and pled guilty to 31 counts of bank fraud and tax evasion. (2018)
- State Representative John Carnevale (D) convicted of perjury. (2018)
- State Representative Raymond Gallison (D) was convicted of fraud. (2017)
- State Representative Gordon Fox (D) and Speaker of the House, pleaded guilty to wire fraud, bribery and filing a false tax return. Fox used $108,000 from his campaign account for personal expenses, accepted a $52,000 bribe to push for the issuance of a liquor license for a Providence restaurant in his role as a member of the Board of Licenses, and failed to declare these illegal sources income on his tax returns. (2015)
- State Representative Leo Medina (D) convicted of stealing life insurance. (2014)
- State Senator Patrick McDonald (D) convicted of embezzlement. (2014)
- State Representative John McCauley Jr (D) convicted of tax evasion. (2012)
- State Senator Christopher Maselli (D) convicted of bank fraud. (2010)

== South Carolina ==
- State Representative Jim Harrison (South Carolina politician) (R) convicted of corruption. (2018)
- State Senator John E. Courson (R) was convicted of misconduct and illegal use of campaign funds. Courson had paid Richard Quinn & Associates $247,829 of campaign money over six years and got back $132,802 for personal use. (2018)
- State Representative Jim Merrill (R) convicted of corruption. (2017)
- State Representative Chris Corley (R) pled guilty to first-degree domestic violence for beating his wife and threatening to kill her with a gun. (2017)
- State Representative Thad Viers (R) convicted of money laundering, sentenced to three years in federal prison. (2015) Previously arrested in 2012 on charges of harassing a 28-year-old woman described as an ex-girlfriend. He subsequently withdrew his bid for GOP nomination to the US Congress from South Carolina's 7th congressional district, citing "personal reasons". He was sentenced in 2014 to 60 days in jail for second-degree harassment.

== Tennessee ==
- State Representative Joe E. Armstrong (D) convicted of falsifying tax returns. (2016)
- State Representative Curry Todd (R) from Collierville, pled guilty to possessing a loaded gun while DUI. He was sentenced to 48 hours in jail, one year of probation, fined, given community service, alcohol training, alcohol car locking device and ordered to participate in MADD. (2013)
- State Senator Brian Kelsey (R) from Memphis in the 31st District, pleaded guilty to attempting to funnel campaign money from his state legislative seat toward supporting a US Congressional run.. He was sentenced to 21 months in prison. (2016)

=== Local ===
- Mayor of Nashville Megan Barry (D) pleaded guilty to felony theft related to an affair she had with the police officer who ran her security detail. (2018)
- Sheriff of Rutherford County Robert F. Arnold (R) pleaded guilty to wire fraud, honest services fraud, and extortion in a scheme to distribute cigarettes to jailed prisoners. (2017)

== Texas ==
- State Representative Carlos Uresti (D) convicted of fraud, money laundering, and conspiracy to commit bribery. (2018)
- State Representative Joe Driver (R) pleaded guilty to using tens of thousands of taxpayer dollars to reimburse himself for travel expenses that his campaign had already funded. (2011)

=== Local ===
- City Councillor of Dallas Carolyn Davis (-) was convicted of bribery. (2019)
- Mayor of Dallas Dwaine Caraway (D) convicted of corruption (2018)
- State District Judge Angus Kelly McGinty (R) was arrested because he solicited and accepted bribes in exchange for favorable rulings. He pleaded guilty to a charge of honest services fraud and was given a two-year prison sentence (2015)
- District Attorney for Cameron County Armando Villalobos (-) convicted of bribery. (2013)

== Virginia ==
- State Delegate Ron Villanueva (R) was convicted of fraud and sentenced to 2 1/2 years in federal prison. (2019)
- State Delegate Phil Hamilton (R) sentenced to 9 1/2 years in prison for federal bribery and extortion. (2011)

== Washington, D.C. ==
=== Local ===
- District of Columbia Councillor Michael Brown (D) was convicted of bribery and sentenced to 39 months. (2013)
- Chairman of the Council of the District of Columbia Kwame R. Brown (D) was convicted of bank fraud. (2012)
- District of Columbia Councillor Harry Thomas, Jr. (D) was convicted of felony counts of theft of government funds and falsifying tax returns. (2012)

== Washington ==
- Auditor of Washington Troy Kelley (D) was convicted of fraud. (2017)

== Wisconsin ==
- State Representative Jeff Wood, (R), has pleaded no contest to fifth-offense OWI charge which is a felony. He has been sentenced to spend nine months in jail, with three years' probation. (2011)

== West Virginia ==
- Justice of the Supreme Court of Appeals of West Virginia Allen Loughry (R) pleaded guilty to fraud. (2019)
- Justice of the Supreme Court of Appeals of West Virginia Menis Ketchum (D) pleaded guilty to wire fraud. (2018)

== See also ==
- List of federal political scandals in the United States
- List of American federal politicians convicted of crimes
- List of United States representatives expelled, censured, or reprimanded
- List of United States senators expelled or censured
- List of federal political sex scandals in the United States
- 2017–18 United States political sexual scandals
- List of American state and local politicians convicted of crimes
