= Senator Leftwich =

Senator Leftwich may refer to:

- Debbe Leftwich (fl. 2000s), Oklahoma State Senate
- Keith Leftwich (1954–2003), Oklahoma State Senate
