= 2017–18 United States political sexual scandals =

Heightened period of allegations

The years 2017 and 2018 were a heightened period of allegations of sexual misconduct, harassment and assault, some of which resulted in the firing or resignation of American politicians. Some of the allegations are linked to the aftermath of the Harvey Weinstein sexual abuse cases starting in October 2017 amid the wider MeToo movement.

== Executive branch ==
=== Donald Trump ===
==== Stormy Daniels ====
On January 12, 2018, The Wall Street Journal reported that Donald Trump's personal lawyer, Michael Cohen paid porn star Stormy Daniels $130,000 in October 2016, shortly before the presidential election, as hush money to deny having had an affair with Trump in 2006. The Wall Street Journal elaborated that the payment was done that month to a representative of Daniels via a private company established in Delaware by Cohen. At the time, Clifford was reportedly in talks to share her account with Good Morning America and Slate. Cohen has denied the existence of an affair on behalf of Trump; he also produced a letter allegedly signed by Daniels denying both the affair and the payment of hush money.

On January 17, 2018, In Touch Weekly published excerpts of a 2011 interview of Daniels alleging a 2006 extramarital affair with Trump. The magazine describes her account as being supported by a polygraph and corroborated by both her friend and ex-husband.

The political watchdog group Common Cause filed a complaint on January 22, 2018, calling on the Federal Election Commission and U.S. Department of Justice to investigate if the reported payout violated campaign finance rules. In response to this complaint, Cohen said that he had given $130,000 to Daniels from his own pocket, that it was for matters unrelated to the Trump campaign or Trump Organization, and that he was not reimbursed for the payment.

On August 21, 2018, Donald Trump's personal lawyer, Cohen, pleaded guilty to eight counts of tax evasion, bank fraud and campaign finance violations. Two of them were related to hush-money payments made to Stormy Daniels and Karen McDougal. Cohen entered his plea months after his office and hotel room were raided by the FBI. On December 12, 2018, Cohen was sentenced to three years in prison.

In 2023, Trump was indicted by a Manhattan grand jury for his alleged role in securing hush money payments to Daniels during his campaign. He was arraigned on April 4, 2023 and ultimately convicted.

==== Karen McDougal ====
In February 2018, The New Yorker's Ronan Farrow wrote about an alleged affair between Trump and Playboy model Karen McDougal, as well as the "catch and kill" procedure of the purchase and withholding of the story by American Media, Inc. (AMI), largely corroborating a 2016 report in The Wall Street Journal, except that the affair had gone on for nine months. The story was based on McDougal's handwritten memoirs of the affair, which McDougal's friend passed to Farrow. McDougal confirmed to Farrow that she had written the memoirs. Farrow quotes the memoirs as stating that McDougal first met Trump in June 2006 at a party hosted by Hugh Hefner at the Playboy Mansion. Trump kept in contact with McDougal, and they had sex on the first date. During the affair, she met members of his family and he promised to buy her an apartment in New York. To avoid "paper trails", Trump had McDougal pay for flight and hotel expenses when she flew to meet him, then reimbursed her. McDougal ended the affair in April 2007 due to guilt and being offended by some of Trump's comments.

McDougal declined to discuss details of the alleged affair due to her agreement with AMI, but she told Farrow that she regretted signing that agreement, saying, "It took my rights away... I don't know what I'm allowed to talk about. I'm afraid to even mention his name." Farrow also wrote that AMI CEO/Chairman David Pecker has a "favorite tactic" of buying "a story in order to bury it". AMI said it did not publish McDougal's story as it was not credible, and a spokesperson for the White House denied the affair.

On March 22, 2018, McDougal was interviewed by Anderson Cooper on AC360 in which she detailed her alleged affair with Trump. In the interview McDougal said that Trump tried to give her money after they first had sex. She also stated that their relationship lasted ten months and that she visited Trump "many dozens of times".

In March 2018, McDougal filed a lawsuit against American Media, Inc. in Los Angeles Superior Court, aiming to invalidate the non-disclosure agreement. On April 19, 2018, American Media, Inc. settled with McDougal; the settlement allows her to speak about the alleged affair.

In July 2018, The New York Times reported that two months before the 2016 presidential election, Trump's personal lawyer, Michael Cohen, had secretly recorded a conversation between him and Trump regarding paying McDougal. Another personal lawyer to Trump, Rudy Giuliani, said that Trump did not know of the recording, and gave two versions of the topic of conversation: 1. that the discussion was about planning to pay McDougal directly, and 2. that it was about planning to pay American Media Inc. (AMI) for the rights to McDougal's story. This appeared to contradict a previous claim by Trump's campaign spokeswoman Hope Hicks days before the election when she responded to the report by The Wall Street Journal about AMI's payment to McDougal that "we have no knowledge of any of this."

=== Rob Porter ===
Porter (R) resigned from the position of White House Staff Secretary on February 7, 2018, following public allegations of spousal abuse from his two ex-wives. The allegations were supported by photographs of a black eye (which Porter claimed he took) and a restraining order. Porter has said the allegations are false and are part of a "coordinated smear campaign".

=== David Sorensen ===
The Republican White House Speechwriter, resigned as a result of allegations by his ex-wife, that he was violent and emotionally abusive during their turbulent 2½ year marriage. Sorensen denied the charges, but left his position.

== United States Senate ==
=== Al Franken ===
United States Senator Al Franken of Minnesota, on November 16, 2017, was accused by media personality Leeann Tweeden, who wrote in a blog post that during a USO tour in 2006, Franken forcibly kissed her without her consent as part of a rehearsal for a USO skit. She wrote that he "put his hand on the back of my head, mashed his lips against mine and aggressively stuck his tongue in my mouth ... I felt disgusted and violated." Franken was also photographed appearing to grope her breasts while she was seated and sleeping on an aircraft wearing Interceptor Body Armor and a helmet. In response Franken said, "I certainly don't remember the rehearsal for the skit in the same way, but I send my sincerest apologies to Leeann ... As to the photo, it was clearly intended to be funny but wasn't. I shouldn't have done it." A few hours later, Franken issued a longer apology, which Tweeden accepted.

Senate leaders Mitch McConnell and Chuck Schumer sent the information to the Senate Ethics Committee for review, a decision supported by members of both parties including Franken himself. The next day, Abby Honold, who had worked with Franken to introduce legislation that would provide training to law enforcement interviewing victims of trauma, requested that Franken withdraw his name as the sponsor of that bill. Honold had been raped by a former Franken intern before this scandal broke around Franken. Franken complied and Senator Amy Klobuchar took over the bill's sponsorship.

On November 20, 2017, Lindsay Menz accused Franken of touching her clothed buttocks while the two posed for a photo at the Minnesota State Fair in 2010. In a statement responding to the allegation, Franken said, "I take thousands of photos at the state fair surrounded by hundreds of people, and I certainly don't remember taking this picture. I feel badly that Ms. Menz came away from our interaction feeling disrespected." Later, two more women accused Franken of similar misconduct during political events in 2007 and 2008, incidents Franken said he also did not remember. Some liberal groups and commentators, including the Indivisible movement and Sally Kohn, called on Franken to resign because of these allegations. Franken issued another apology on November 23, 2017, stating, "I've met tens of thousands of people and taken thousands of photographs, often in crowded and chaotic situations. I'm a warm person; I hug people. I've learned from recent stories that in some of those encounters, I crossed a line for some women — and I know that any number is too many." A fifth woman, Stephanie Kemplin, alleged Franken touched her breast while posing for a photo with her during a 2003 USO tour. She is the second person to allege that such behavior took place while Franken was on a USO tour.

== United States House of Representatives ==
=== Joe Barton ===
Republican Party (R) United States Representative Joe Barton from the Texas' 6th District and member of the conservative Freedom Caucus was found to have sent videos of himself masturbating to several women on the internet two years before divorcing from his second wife. Barton apologized and vowed to remain in Congress and even fight the charges. A week later, Tea Party organizer Kelly Canon corroborated the stories by revealing that Barton had once asked if she was wearing panties and made other sexual references while he was still married. Barton finally announced he would not seek re-election (2017).

=== John Conyers ===
Dean of the United States House of Representatives Congressman John Conyers (D) of Michigan was found to have allegedly paid a settlement of $27,000 to a former member of his staff, who had accused him of sexual assault. BuzzFeed reported on this settlement on November 20, 2017, based on documents from Mike Cernovich including accounts of other ethical concerns associated with Conyers's office such as sexual harassment of other female staffers. Conyers responded to these reports, saying, "In our country, we strive to honor this fundamental principle that all are entitled to due process. In this case, I expressly and vehemently denied the allegations made against me, and continue to do so. My office resolved the allegations — with an express denial of liability — in order to save all involved from the rigors of protracted litigation."

On November 21, 2017, the House Ethics Committee launched an investigation into multiple sexual harassment allegations against Conyers. Reports of a second woman accusing Conyers of sexual harassment appeared later in November 2017. House Minority Leader Nancy Pelosi, who had initially stated that Conyers was an "icon" and had done a great deal to protect women, called upon Conyers to resign, and called the allegations against him "very credible", as did House Assistant Democratic Leader Jim Clyburn.

On December 5, he resigned from Congress.

=== Blake Farenthold ===
He announced his retirement on December 15. On April 6, 2018, however, Farenthold abruptly resigned from Congress.

See Blake Farenthold.

=== Trent Franks ===
It was reported on December 7, 2017, that Congressman Trent Franks (R) of Arizona was the subject of a House Ethics Committee investigation over allegations of improper conduct. On December 7, 2017, Franks announced that he would resign on December 8, 2017. According to a report in The Washington Post, Franks and his wife were struggling with infertility and Franks had asked two female staffers if they would consider serving as surrogate mothers for Franks and his wife. Franks maintained that he never "physically intimidated, coerced, or had, or attempted to have, any sexual contact with any member of my congressional staff."

=== Alcee Hastings ===
A former staff member of Congressman Alcee Hastings (D) of Florida filed a lawsuit against him and the Helsinki Commission (which Alcee was a part of) for alleged sexual assault. Ultimately, Hastings was released from the lawsuit, but the Helsinki Commission was deemed liable and had to pay $200,000. On December 8, 2017, it was discovered that $200,000 in taxpayer money were used to pay for the lawsuit.

=== Ruben Kihuen ===
Congressman Ruben Kihuen of Nevada (D) was accused by a former staffer on the Kihuen campaign of repeatedly propositioning her for dates and sex. When asked about the accusations, Kihuen said, "I sincerely apologize for anything that I may have said or done that made her feel uncomfortable." The chair of the Democratic Congressional Campaign Committee, Ben Ray Luján, and Nancy Pelosi, said that he should resign.

=== Pat Meehan ===
On January 20, 2018, it was revealed that Republican Congressman Pat Meehan of Pennsylvania used taxpayers money to settle a sexual harassment claim brought by a former member of staff. Meehan also allegedly grew hostile after the alleged victim rejected his advances. Meehan was soon removed from the U.S. House Ethics Committee and announced he would retire at the end of his term.

=== Timothy F. Murphy ===
US Representative Timothy F. Murphy (R) was married and an outspoken opponent of abortion; however, in 2017, he was revealed to have strongly encouraged his mistress to get an abortion when she became pregnant. Before an investigation could begin, Murphy resigned.

== Federal judges ==
=== Alex Kozinski ===
Judge of the United States Court of Appeals for the Ninth Circuit Alex Kozinski (R), facing multiple alleged accounts of sexual harassment against women announced his immediate resignation. The U.S. judicial council opened a probe in Kozinski's alleged misconduct, but closed it on February 5, 2018, reporting that Kozinski's retirement put the case outside its investigatory scope.

Kozinski was a mentor to Supreme Court nominee Brett Kavanaugh, but during the hearings preceding the nomination vote, Kavanaugh denied awareness of Kozinski's history of sexual harassment.

=== Brett Kavanaugh ===
During the hearings preceding the confirmation vote to add Republican Brett Kavanaugh to the Supreme Court of the United States, several women alleged sexual misconduct by the judge during his time in high school and college. Christine Blasey Ford accused Kavanaugh of sexual assault during a high school party, and Deborah Ramirez, a Yale classmate, accused him of indecent exposure during their freshman year.

== State politicians ==
=== Alabama ===
- Former Chief Justice of the Supreme Court of Alabama Roy Moore (R) was accused of sexually harassing nine women, including one who had been 14 years old at the time.

=== Alaska ===
- Democratic Party (D) State Representative Dean Westlake was accused in December 2017 by female capitol staffers of inappropriate sexual behavior. Westlake apologized, but when the story of his 1988 impregnation of a 16-year-old girl was about to be publicized, he tendered his resignation.
- Zach Fansler (D) State Representative, resigned effective Feb. 12, 2018, after being accused of slapping a woman hard enough to rupture her eardrum during a sexual encounter after a night of drinking. He pleaded guilty June 21 to a charge of misdemeanor harassment.

=== Arizona ===
- State Representative Don Shooter (R) was accused of sexually harassing nine women, including several fellow state representatives, and was suspended as chairman of the powerful Appropriations Committee. He was later expelled from the State Legislature.
- State Senator Steve Montenegro (R) who is married, began sexting with a legislative staffer. Montenegro was forced to step down and end his candidacy for the US House seat vacated by Trent Franks (R).

=== California ===
- State Assemblyman Raul Bocanegra (D) was accused of sexually harassing various women. He resigned later that week.
- State Assemblywoman Autumn Burke (D) was accused of sexual harassment.
- State Assemblyman Matt Dababneh (D) was accused of sexually harassing two female lobbyists. He later announced his resignation effective the end of the year.
- State Assemblyman Devon Mathis (R) was being investigated for an alleged sexual assault against a female member of his staff.
- State Senator Tony Mendoza (D) was accused of inviting young female staffers to his residence in Sacramento for sexual activity. He later resigned.
- State Senator Robert Hertzberg (D) was put under investigation after being accused of unwanted hugging by two female lawmakers and former State Assemblywoman Linda Halderman (R).
- State Assemblywoman Cristina Garcia (D) was accused of sexually harassing a staffer in 2014 and lobbyist in 2017. On February 9, 2018, Garcia denied the allegations, and said she would take a voluntary, unpaid leave of absence while she was being investigated.

=== Colorado ===
- State Senator Randy Baumgardner (R) was accused of sexual harassment by a legislative aide who said he repeatedly grabbed or slapped her buttocks. The vote to expel him was 17 to 17 along party lines, with only 1 Republican voting for expulsion. Senate President Kevin Grantham (R) cited inconsistencies and inaccuracies in the investigative report. (2018)
- State Senator Larry Crowder (R) was accused by Susan Lontine (D) State Representative from Denver, of pinching her buttocks and making sexually inappropriate comments. Crowder apologized though did not take steps to acknowledge or change his behavior. (2017)
- State Representative Steve Lebsock (D/R) was accused of sexual harassment by fellow State Representative Faith Winter and four others. He was later expelled by the State Legislature.
- State Representative Paul Rosenthal (D) was accused of sexual assault by several young men. No charges were brought, though he failed to be re-elected.
- State Senator Jack Tate (R) was accused of sexual harassment by a former intern. On March 29, Senate President Kevin Grantham (R) wrote in a letter to Tate that he did not believe Tate violated any sexual harassment policies and decided to close the investigation.

=== Florida ===
- State Representative Ritch Workman (R) resigned as the nominee for the Florida Public Service Commission after being accused of sexual harassment.
- State Senator Jack Latvala (R) was accused in November 2017, by six women who accused Latvala of sexually harassing them. These accusations came from female staffers from both parties, as well as lobbyists. Photos also surfaced from a private investigator of Latvala kissing a lobbyist on the lips. The women's complaints describe repeated encroachment by Latvala onto their bodies. He has subsequently been removed from his position as Chairman of the Senate Appropriations Committee in response to the allegations and later resigned from the State Senate.
- Florida Democratic Party Chairman Stephen Bittel (D) resigned after accusations of sexual impropriety from numerous women.
- Clint Reed, chief of staff for US Senator Marco Rubio (R) was fired for allegations of "improper conduct" with an unnamed subordinate. (2018)
- Jeff Clemens (D) State Senator less than a day after discovery that he was having an affair. He admitted to the affair and resigned. (2017)
- Frank Artiles (R) State Senator, was being investigated for using sexist and racist profanities, and hiring female models as ‘consultants’ to his PAC. He resigned the next day (2017). The next morning, before the Senate investigation had begun, Artiles resigned, calling his continued presence in government a distraction and apologizing again.

=== Hawaii ===
- State Representative Joseph M. Souki (D) resigned after being accused of sexual harassment.

=== Idaho ===
- State Representative Brandon Hixon (R) resigned after being accused of sexual abuse. He killed himself on January 9, 2018.
- Aaron von Ehlinger (R) Idaho State Representative from the 6th District, was accused of "unconsented sexual contact" with multiple female legislative volunteers, including a 19 year old staffer. An Ethics Investigation was unanimously approved and Arron von Ehlinger resigned. (2021)

=== Illinois ===
- State Senator Ira Silverstein (D) was accused of sexual harassment, and resigned from his position as Majority Caucus Chair.
- State Representative Nick Sauer (R) resigned on August 1, 2018 after an ex-girlfriend accused him of posting revenge porn pictures on a fake Instagram account.

=== Indiana ===
- Attorney General Curtis Hill (R) was accused by multiple women of inappropriate sexual behavior in March 2018. Four women have accused Hill of groping them during a party at a bar on the last night of the Indiana General Assembly session, prompting an investigation by the Indiana Inspector General. At the request of General Assembly leadership, a law firm prepared a confidential memorandum dated June 2018 that summarized interviews with the woman; the memo was obtained by The Indianapolis Star and made public the following month. Of the four women, three have publicly come forward—State Representative Mara Candelaria Reardon and two legislative staffers.

=== Iowa ===
- Bill Dix (R) State Senator and Majority Leader from Shell Rock, fired Kirsten Anderson (R) Communications Director for the Iowa Senate Republican Caucus, after she reported sexual harassment. A trial eventually led to an award from the state for wrongful termination of $1.75 million. (2017)
- State Senator Bill Dix (R) resigned hours after a video of him kissing a female lobbyist in a bar was released online (2018).
- Nate Boulton (D) suspended his campaign for the Iowa gubernatorial election, 2018 after three women accused him of sexual assault.

=== Kentucky ===
- Speaker of the Kentucky House of Representatives Jeff Hoover (R) resigned from his position as Speaker after it had been revealed he had settled a case involving alleged sexual harassment.
- State Representative Dan Johnson (R) was accused of molesting a 17-year-old girl during a New Year's Eve party. Johnson denied this accusation, refused to resign, and killed himself on December 13, 2017.
- Four Republican State Representatives and a legislative staffer signed a secret sexual harassment settlement brokered by the Kentucky House Legislative Ethics Commission involving sexting a woman who once worked for the state's House Republican Caucus. (2018)

=== Louisiana ===
- Secretary of State of Louisiana Tom Schedler (R) resigned from office after his executive secretary accused him of sexual harassment which included visits, propositions, gifts and sex tapes. Several officials, including Governor of Louisiana John Bel Edwards (D) and Senator John Neely Kennedy (R) had called for Schedler's resignation before his announcement. (2018)

=== Massachusetts ===
- President of the Massachusetts Senate Stan Rosenberg (D) stood down as President after four men accused Bryon Hefner, Rosenberg's husband, of sexual misconduct.

=== Minnesota ===
- State Senator Dan Schoen (DFL) was accused of sexually harassing various women. He announced his resignation the next day.
- State Representative Tony Cornish (R) was accused by fellow State Representative Erin Maye Quade (DFL) and another woman of sexually harassing them. He resigned the next day. (2017)

=== Mississippi ===
- State Representative John Moore (R) resigned from office after accusations of sexual misconduct from multiple women.

=== Missouri ===
- Governor of Missouri Eric Greitens (R) disclosed in January 2018 that he had had an extramarital affair with his hair stylist in 2015, just prior to his campaign for governor. On February 22, 2018, Greitens was indicted for invasion of privacy, and released on bail. State attorneys dropped this charge on May 14, 2018. Greitens resigned in early June 2018.

=== New York ===
- Attorney General of New York Eric Schneiderman (D) resigned on May 7, 2018 after being accused by four women of physical assault. He announced his resignation the next day.
- State Senator Jeffrey D. Klein (D), was accused by a female former staffer of having forcibly kissed her in 2015.
- State Assemblyman Steven McLaughlin (R) was sanctioned by the Speaker of the Assembly for allegedly asking an Assembly staffer for nude photos and lying to investigators after the staffer came forward.
- New York City Councilman Andy King (D) was accused by a staffer in a complaint to the city council's Standards and Ethics Committee of making sexually suggestive comments.
- State Assemblywoman Angela Wozniak (C/R) was banned by the Assembly from hiring interns in 2016 after retaliating against a top staffer with whom she had had an affair. She chose not to seek reelection.
- State Assemblyman Dennis H. Gabryszak (D) was accused by up to seven former staffers of sexual harassment in 2013. He was later fined $70,000. Angela Wozniak was elected to his place in the Assembly.
- State Assemblyman Micah Kellner (D) was publicly reprimanded by the Assembly Speaker Sheldon Silver in 2013 for sexually harassing an interns in 2009 and 2011. He was banned from hiring interns.
- State Assemblyman Vito J. Lopez (D) was publicly censured by Assembly Speaker Sheldon Silver and resigned in 2013 after being accused of groping, intimidating and manipulating young female staffers in a 2012 scandal. The state paid $580,000 to settle claims against him.
- State Assemblyman Sam Hoyt (D) was publicly reprimanded in 2008 by the Assembly Speaker Sheldon Silver for an inappropriate relationship with an intern in 2003 and was barred from access to an internship program. In 2018 it was revealed he had spent $50,000 to attempt to silence a woman with whom he had an affair and assisted in obtaining a state job.

=== Ohio ===
- State Senator Cliff Hite (R) was accused of repeatedly propositioning a state employee for sex. He resigned a week later.
- State Representative Wes Goodman (R) State Representative from Cardington, provided no details about the alleged “inappropriate conduct with another man” that prompted his sudden resignation from office (2017)

=== Oklahoma ===
- State Senator Bryce Marlatt (R) resigned after being charged with sexual battery of an Uber driver. (2017)

=== Oregon ===
- State Senator Jeff Kruse (R) was removed from all of his Senate committee assignments by Senate President Peter Courtney. An article in The Oregonian indicated that Kruse had been accused of inappropriate touching and had failed to resolve ongoing workplace issues. The removal came days after Senator Sara Gelser indicated she had been inappropriately touched by Kruse. Senator Ginny Burdick supported Gelser's allegations, calling Kruse's behavior a "chronic problem", recalling an incident where she had to tell Kruse to get his hands off of Gelser and another incident where Kruse had inappropriately touched a female staffer on the Senate floor. He later resigned.

=== Pennsylvania ===
- State Senator Daylin Leach (D) was accused of sexual misconduct. Governor of Pennsylvania Tom Wolf (D) called for his resignation.
- Brian Ellis (R) State Representative from Butler County in the 11th District, was accused of having sexual assaulted a woman while she was blacked out in 2015. When a formal complaint was made, the married Ellis resigned six days later. (2019)

=== Rhode Island ===
- State Senator Nicholas Kettle (R) was arrested on February 16, 2018, with charges of video voyeurism and extortion. He resigned on February 22, 2018.

=== South Carolina ===
- Chris Corley (R) State Representative, pled guilty to first-degree domestic violence for beating his wife and threatening to kill her with a gun in front of their children after she confronted him about his infidelity. He was sentenced to five years probation. (2017)

=== South Dakota ===
- Mathew Wollmann (R) State Representative from Madison, resigned from the South Dakota State Legislature admitting that he had sexual relations with two interns during his first term of office. (2017)

=== Texas ===
- State Senator Borris Miles (D) was accused of sexually harassing various women over a period of years.
- State Senator Carlos Uresti (D) was accused of sexually harassing various women over a period of years.

=== Utah ===
- State Representative Jon Stanard (R) resigned on February 7, 2018, citing "personal and family reasons." The next day, the British tabloid The Daily Mail published a report alleging Stanard paid $250 for two sexual encounters with a Salt Lake City call girl. The Utah House of Representatives opened an investigation into these allegations.

=== Wisconsin ===
- State Assemblyman Josh Zepnick (D) was accused of sexually harassing two women in separate incidents in 2011 and 2015. Zepnick was stripped of his Assembly privileges, including committee seats and his right to attend caucus meetings. The eight-term assemblymen apologized but refused to resign. He was defeated in the Democratic primary in 2018 by Marisabel Cabrera.

=== Wyoming ===
- Secretary of State Ed Murray (R) resigned from office after being accused by two women of sexually assaulting them.

== See also ==
- 2017 Westminster sexual scandals
- List of federal political sex scandals in the United States
- Bill Clinton sexual misconduct allegations
- Ed Murray (Washington politician) § Child sexual abuse allegations
- Donald Trump sexual misconduct allegations
- Donald Trump Access Hollywood tape
- List of 2010s American state and local politicians convicted of crimes
- List of federal political scandals in the United States
- Category:Political sex scandals in the United States
- Category:Sexual abuse cover-ups
- Category:Sexual harassment in the United States
- Category:State and local political sex scandals in the United States
