= John Manning =

John Manning may refer to:

== Politics ==
- John B. Manning (1833–1908), mayor of Buffalo, New York
- John Lawrence Manning (1816–1889), Governor of South Carolina, 1852–1854
- John Manning Jr. (1830–1899), U.S. Representative from North Carolina
- John Manning (New Hampshire politician)

== Sports ==
- Jack Manning (baseball) (1853–1929), American baseball player
- Jack Manning (footballer) (John Tom Manning 1886-1946), English football player
- Jack Manning (cricketer) (1923–1988), Australian cricketer
- John Manning (footballer) (1940–2021), English football player
- John Manning (rugby union) (fl. 1880–1904), Australian rugby player
- John Manning (rugby league) (born 1978), Australian actor and former rugby league footballer

== Other ==
- John Manning (journalist) (died 1868), New Zealand newspaper editor
- John Charles Manning (born 1962), South African botanist
- John Edmondson Manning (1848–1910), English Unitarian minister
- John F. Manning (born 1961), Harvard Law School dean
- John J. Manning (1842–1911), Irish American frontiersman
- John J. Manning (unionist) (1868–1934), American labor union leader
- John Ruel Manning (1897–1939), American chemist and technologist
- Jack Manning (architect) (1929–2021), New Zealand architect
- John Manning, co-founder of the Atlantic Brass Quintet
- John T. Manning, British evolutionary psychologist and evolutionary biologist

== See also ==
- Jack Manning (disambiguation)
