= Michael Easterday =

American politician

Michael E. Easterday

Member of the South Carolina House of Representatives from the 27th district
- In office 1995–2002
- Preceded by: Milton Otho Alexander
- Succeeded by: Garry R. Smith

Personal details
- Born: August 30, 1961 (age 64) Flint, Michigan
- Party: Republican

Michael E. Easterday (born August 30, 1961) is an American politician.

== Early life, education and career ==
Easterday earned a Bachelor of Science degree from Bob Jones University in 1987, and a Juris Doctor degree from the University of South Carolina School of Law in 1999.

Easterday currently works in health care administration.

== Political career ==
Easterday was elected to the South Carolina House of Representatives from the 27th District in 1995.

Easterday served as a member of the House Judiciary Committee, chairing the Criminal Laws Subcommittee, and as Secretary of the House Ethics Committee. On January 16, 2003, he joined the Office of Governor Mark Sanford, serving as a Liaison between the Executive and Legislative branch. Upon taking the position, Easterday resigned his seat in the House. Garry R. Smith won the special election to succeed him.

Easterday later served as Chief of Staff and Director of Office on Aging for Lieutenant Governor Andre Bauer.
