= Garry R. Smith =

American politician

Member of the South Carolina House of Representatives from the 27th district
- In office 2003 – December 6, 2022
- Preceded by: Michael Easterday
- Succeeded by: David Vaughan

Personal details
- Born: March 4, 1957 (age 69) Aiken, South Carolina, United States
- Party: Republican
- Parent: J. Roland Smith

Garry R. Smith (born March 4, 1957) is an American politician.

== Early life, education and career ==
Born in Aiken to South Carolina legislator J. Roland Smith and his wife Peggy, Smith earned a Bachelor of Arts at the University of South Carolina-Aiken in 1979, and a Master's in Public Administration from the University of South Carolina in 1983. He served as Bamberg County Administrator from 1988 to 1992, and Simpsonville City Administrator from 1992 to 1995.

== Political career ==
Smith served as a member of the South Carolina House of Representatives from the 27th District from 2003 to 2022. He is a member of the Republican Party.

Smith chaired the House Operations Committee, served on the House Ways and Means Committee, and chaired the Communications and Technology ALEC task force.

== Community service ==
Smith's community service included presidencies of the Simpsonville Rotary Club, the South Carolina Chapter of the American Society of Public Administrators, the South Carolina Managers, Administrators and Supervisors, and chairing the Committee on City Legislative Issues for the South Carolina City and County Management Association and the Greenville County Chief Administrative Officer Group.

== Honors and recognitions ==
Smith twice received the Thomas Jefferson Award for Legislator of the Year. In 2016, his work supporting low-income housing was recognized with an award from Jennifer Pinckney in honor of her husband, Senator Clementa C. Pinckney.
