= Ralph Shortey =

American politician

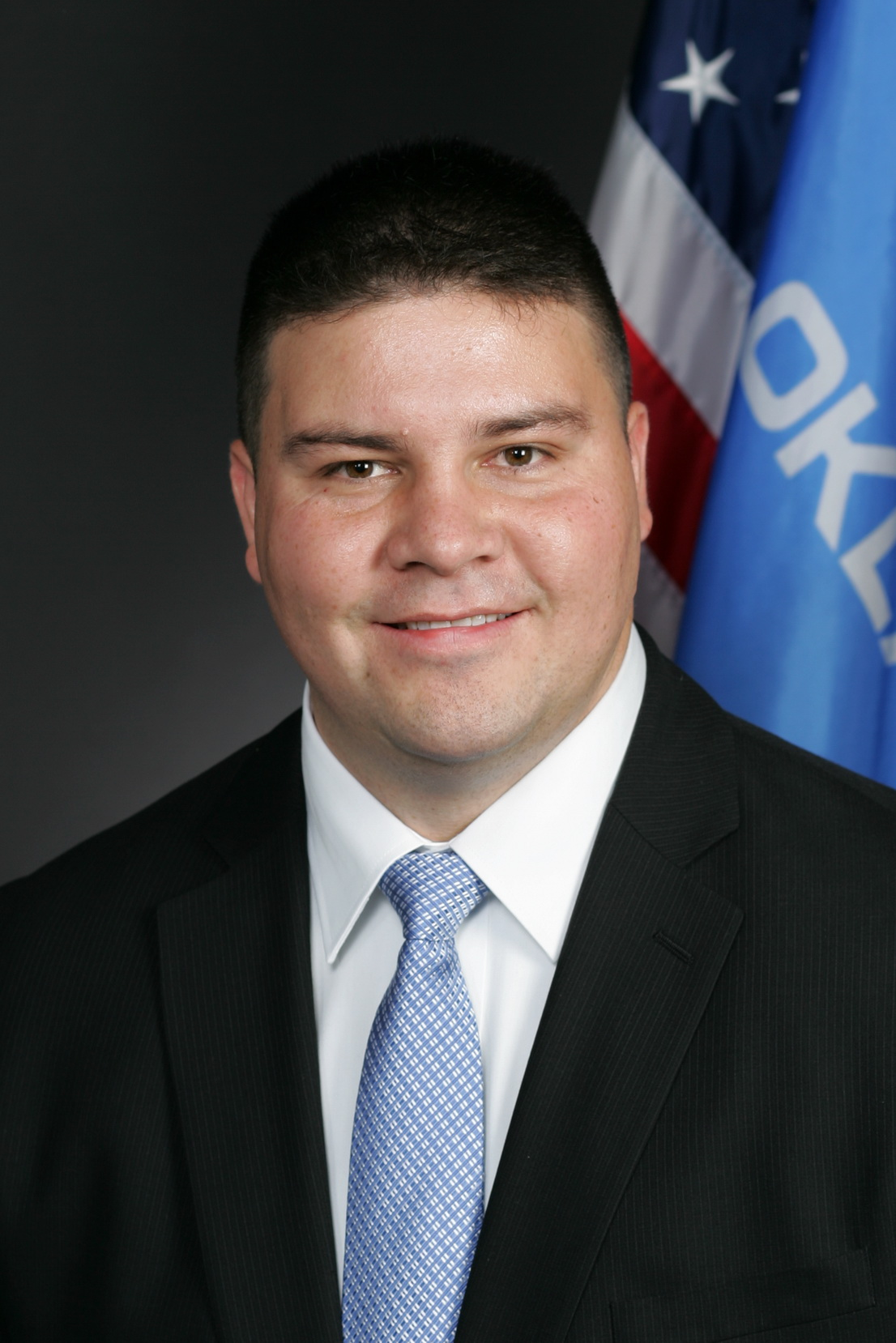
- Shortey in 2010

Member of the Oklahoma Senate from the 44th district
- In office January 2011 – March 22, 2017
- Preceded by: Debbe Leftwich
- Succeeded by: Michael Brooks-Jimenez

Personal details
- Born: Ralph Allan Lee Shortey; February 16, 1982 (age 44) Casper, Wyoming, U.S.
- Party: Republican
- Spouse: Jennifer (m. 2002; div. 2018)
- Children: 4
- Education: Heartland Baptist Bible College
- Criminal information
- Status: In prison
- Conviction: Child sex trafficking
- Penalty: 15 years in prison, plus 10 years' supervised release

Details
- Date apprehended: 2017
- Imprisoned at: Federal Correctional Institution, Seagoville

Ralph Allan Lee Shortey (born February 16, 1982) is an American convicted sex offender and former politician and businessman. A member of the Republican Party, he was elected to the Oklahoma Senate in 2010, defeating several challengers in primary elections, re-elected in 2014 and served his term until 2017. During his tenure, he established a Republican consulting firm. Shortey was the state campaign chair for Donald Trump in the 2016 presidential election.

Shortey resigned in March 2017 after being charged with three felonies related to paying a male minor for sex. In September 2017, a federal grand jury in Oklahoma City charged Shortey on four counts, one of which he pleaded guilty to in November 2017, with an agreement that the others would be dropped. Jailed since his plea, Shortey was sentenced in September 2018 to 15 years in prison, to be followed by 10 years of supervised release.

== Early life ==
According to his official Senate biography, Shortey was born in Casper, Wyoming, and is a member of the Rosebud Sioux Tribe. He spent a portion of his childhood on the Rosebud Indian Reservation in Grass Mountain, South Dakota, before moving to Oklahoma. His attorney said Shortey grew up in poverty, was shot by his brother at the age of 3, and was abused by stepfathers and his mother's boyfriends. Shortey graduated from Westmoore High School in 2000, and studied at Heartland Baptist Bible College.

== Career ==
Shortey worked in the oil and gas industry. He first became involved in politics circa 2002, becoming active in a number of Republican political campaigns. In 2014, Shortey established a Republican political consulting firm, the Precision Strategy Group, that reported earning nearly $300,000 "for consulting, direct mail and polling services." The Associated Press noted that court records showed that Shortey "had some past financial difficulties dating back to before his time in the Senate, including an eviction, debt-related lawsuits and foreclosure proceedings." At least as late as 2016, Shortey was a co-owner of a coffee shop in south Oklahoma City.

== Oklahoma Senate ==
=== 2010 election ===
Shortey was first elected to the Senate in 2010. He was an advocate of family values during his campaigns. Senate District 44 was an open seat (incumbent Senator Debbe Leftwich, who was embroiled in a misconduct probe, decided not to run for reelection). In the initial Republican primary in July 2010, Shortey came in second place in a four-candidate field, with just under 38% of the vote. In the Republican primary runoff the following month, however, Shortey won the nomination, defeating James Davenport, a martial arts studio co-owner and ex-chief of staff to a county commissioner; Shortey received 58% of the vote to Davenport's 42%. In the November general election, Shortey defeated Democratic nominee Randy Rose, a retired Oklahoma City firefighter. Shortey won 57% of the vote to Rose's 43%.

=== 2014 reelection ===
Shortey was reelected in 2014, defeating his Democratic opponent Michael Brooks-Jimenez, an attorney. Shortey received 52% of the vote, compared to Brooks-Jimenez's 42%. In 2017, following Shortey's resignation, Brooks ran again in the special election to fill the vacancy, and won with 54% of the vote.

=== 2017 prosecution and resignation ===
On March 16, 2017, Shortey was charged by the Cleveland County District Attorney with three felony counts—soliciting a minor for prostitution, prostitution within 1,000 feet (300 m) of a church, and transporting someone for prostitution—after he was caught with a 17-year-old boy in a motel room in Moore, Oklahoma. Police reported a "strong odor of raw marijuana" emanating from the room. According to an affidavit, the duo told police they had brought marijuana with them, which Shortey said they were smoking when police arrived. Video from the arrest released by Moore police show Shortey in the motel room wearing a T-shirt that reads, "now go make me a sandwich." Above a cartoon drawing of a sandwich, it cites Ephesians 5:22, a Bible verse that calls on women to obey their husbands. Police said that they discovered sexually explicit text messages between the duo in which Shortey called the teen "baby boy" and offered him cash in exchange for sexual acts. Shortey turned himself in the same day and was released on a $100,000 bond. The FBI and U.S. Secret Service in Oklahoma City both confirmed that they had joined the investigation into Shortey, and the FBI conducted a search of his home. The age of consent in Oklahoma is 16, but, under state law, engaging in prostitution with anyone under 18 is illegal.

After the reports emerged, but before charges were filed, the Oklahoma Senate unanimously voted to strip Shortey of privileges including his parking space, office, and positions on committees, although he retained his seat, ability to vote, and salary. A number of Republican and Democratic Oklahoma officials called upon Shortey to step down, including Governor Mary Fallin. Shortey resigned from office on March 22, 2017—six days after being charged.

== Indictment and sentencing ==
On September 5, 2017, a federal grand jury indicted Shortey on four federal sex trafficking and child pornography charges, involving both the March incident and videos that Shortey was accused of distributing from his cell phone in 2012 and 2013. Shortey pleaded not guilty to these charges. After the federal charges were announced, the Cleveland County district attorney dropped the state charges. A federal jury trial had been scheduled for December 2017. On November 19, 2017, Shortey reached an agreement to plead guilty on November 30 to one count of child sex trafficking; the prosecutor agreed to have the child pornography counts removed. Shortey was jailed immediately after pleading guilty on November 30 and faced a sentence of at least 10 years in prison, with Judge Timothy D. DeGiusti to decide in 2018.

In early December 2017, police released their video of Shortey's arrest at a motel where he was found with a 17-year-old male. In June 2018, prosecutors revealed in a sentencing memorandum that Shortey had sex twice with the victim in the year before they were found together at the hotel. Prosecutors also informed the judge that they would seek full restitution from Shortey for the victim's losses, including the cost of any care. Shortey's lawyer said it would not yet be appropriate to comment.

Jailed since his guilty plea, Shortey was sentenced in Oklahoma City federal court on September 17, 2018, to a total of 15 years in prison, and 10 years of supervised release. In sentencing testimony, Shortey apologized to his family, fellow Christians, and his constituents. His attorney, who said the sentence was fair, requested that Shortey serve it at a facility in Texas with a sex offender rehab program; the Bureau of Prisons placed Shortey at the Federal Correctional Institution, Seagoville in Seagoville, Texas. In February 2019, U.S. District Judge DeGiusti imposed a restitution fine on Shortey of $125,850, about half of the maximum amount.

== Political positions ==
Shortey was a staunch conservative in the Republican-dominated legislature. The Oklahoman noted that Shortey filed bills that "often drew national attention and, at times, national ridicule."

The Associated Press reported that as a state senator, Shortey "routinely voted with his Republican colleagues on bills targeting gay and transgender people", including a measure passed in 2017 to allow business owners to discriminate against LGBT people. Shortey was also known for his firm opposition to illegal immigration and to gun control. He maintained that state legislators had a constitutional right to carry guns in the Oklahoma State Capitol. Duane Chapman ("Dog the Bounty Hunter") and his wife Beth supported legislation introduced by Shortey to regulate the bounty-hunting industry.

Shortey took a "hard-line stance against abortion" and in 2012 proposed legislation to outlaw the use of aborted fetuses in food; the widely ridiculed bill did not receive a committee hearing. In response, Shortey explained his intent was to deter the use of human embryonic stem cells in research by private companies.

In February 2017, Shortey came under public criticism for trying to retighten state drug laws which Oklahoma voters had voted to loosen in November 2016. Arguing that voters had not considered the consequences of their vote, Shortey introduced a bill to increase the penalties for drug possession within 1,000 feet (300 m) of a church or a school, which Oklahoma voters had voted to classify as a misdemeanor instead of a felony.

Although Shortey's district was close to the Capitol, he frequently missed votes; the Associated Press noted that according to an online bill tracking service, Shortey missed nearly half of the votes taken in the Senate.

== Personal life ==
According to his senate biography, Shortey married his "high school sweetheart" Jennifer. They have four children. When the couple divorced in 2018 after 16 years, his wife changed her last name.

Shortey was known in the Senate for his imposing size, at 6 feet 6 inches (198 cm) tall and weighing 315 pounds (143 kg).

== Electoral history ==
=== 2010 ===
Oklahoma Senate primary election, 2010
Party	Candidate	Votes	%
Republican	James Davenport	1,239	49.94
Republican	Ralph Shortey	941	37.93
Republican	Charles L. Peters	164	6.61
Republican	Bing Wines	137	5.52

Oklahoma Senate primary runoff election, 2010
Party	Candidate	Votes	%
Republican	Ralph Shortey	1,306	58.30
Republican	James Davenport	934	41.70

Oklahoma Senate general election, 2010
Party	Candidate	Votes	%
Republican	Ralph Shortey	6,060	57.34
Democratic	Randy Rose	4,509	42.66

=== 2014 ===
Oklahoma Senate general election, 2014
Party	Candidate	Votes	%
Republican	Ralph Shortey	5,418	51.7
Democratic	Michael Brooks-Jimenez	4,384	41.8
Independent	Constance Fawcett	680	6.5
