= Carolyn Coleman =

American politician

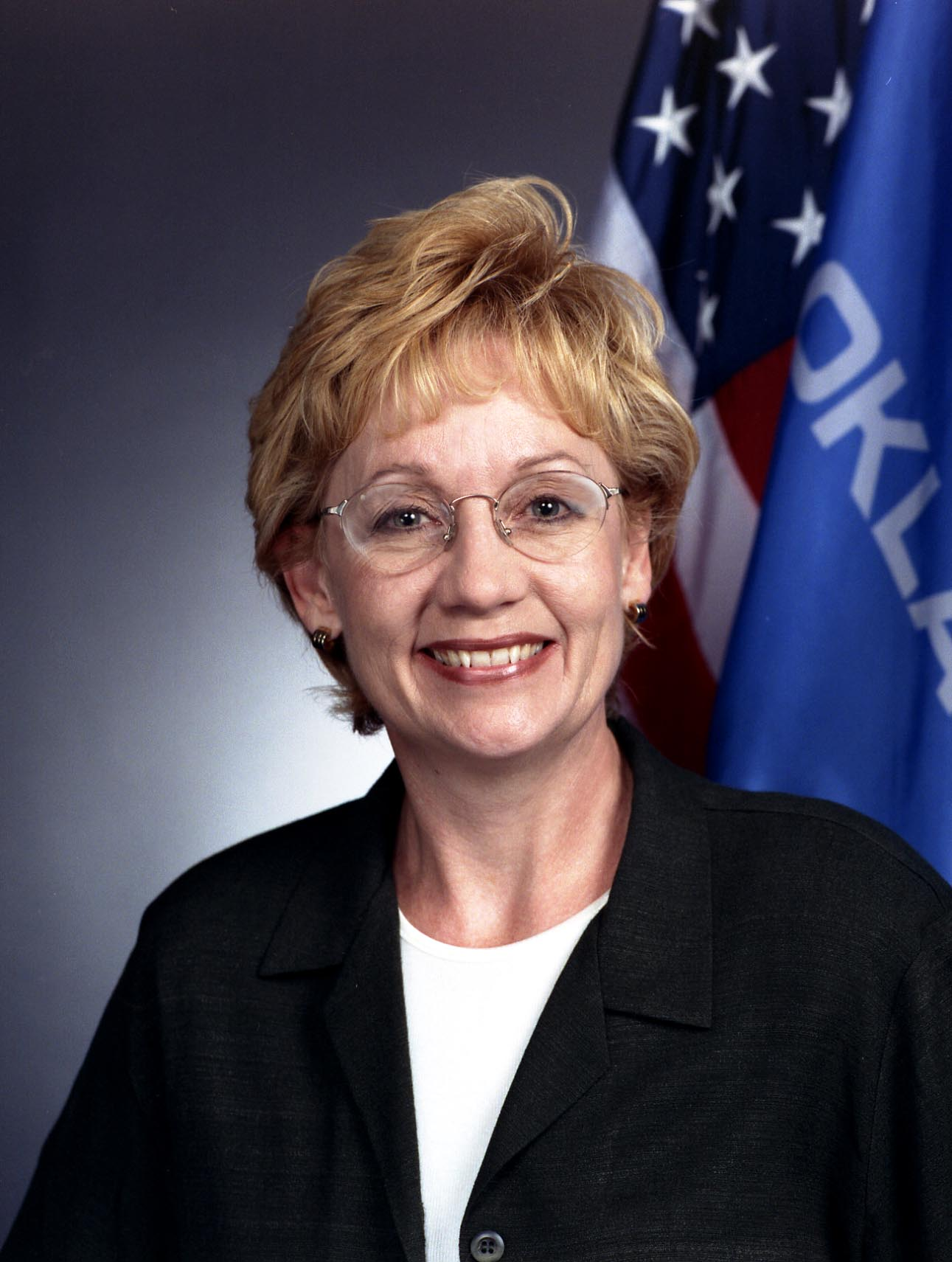

Member of the Oklahoma House of Representatives from the 53 district
- In office 1990–2004
- Preceded by: John D. Lassiter
- Succeeded by: Randy Terrill

Personal details
- Born: Carolyn Coleman; 1952 (age 73–74) Oklahoma City, OK
- Party: Republican
- Profession: Administrative Assistant

Carolyn Coleman is an American politician from the U.S. state of Oklahoma. A Republican, Coleman served as a legislator in the Oklahoma House of Representatives from 1990–2004, representing District 53. Some of the main issues Coleman took up during her time in the legislature include elementary reading, accountability for the spending of citizen's taxes, as well as protecting air and water quality.

== Biography ==
Carolyn Coleman was born in southeast Oklahoma City in 1952, the youngest of three children. Coleman graduated from Crooked Oak High School in 1970. After graduation, Coleman attended college at Rose State College as well as Southwestern Bible College.

Before serving in the House of Representatives, Coleman worked as an administrative assistant for an oil company. She also worked on several campaigns, including the campaign of Helen Cole.

== House of Representatives (1990–2004) ==
In 1990, Coleman campaigned as a Republican candidate in a strongly Democratic district. Coleman won the vote and was sworn into office. In total, Coleman campaigned seven times as she served 14 years in the House. Some of the issues that Coleman focused on while in the legislature include reforming state education, cutting business taxes, protecting air and water quality, and creating harsher punishment for violent and repeat offenders of crime. Coleman is especially known for her work on elementary literacy and reading legislation along with Oklahoma senator Kathleen Wilcoxson.

=== Committees ===
- Education
- Common education subcommittee
- Health and mental health
- Tourism and Recreation
- Veteran Affairs

=== Life after the House ===
After serving in the House for 14 years, Coleman has been taking classes at Oklahoma State University Institute of Technology for fun as well as working part-time.

- Service: Coleman has volunteered her time with several organizations and institutions. Coleman has served on the American Legislative Exchange Council, Southern Regional Education Board, and the Board of Directors for Community Literacy. She also served on the board of directors of the Crisis Pregnancy Center in Oklahoma City.
