= Randy Terrill =

American politician (born 1969)

Member of the Oklahoma House of Representatives from the 53rd district
- In office 2004–2012
- Preceded by: Carolyn Coleman
- Succeeded by: Mark McBride

Personal details
- Born: September 29, 1969 (age 57) Alva, Oklahoma
- Party: Republican
- Education: University of Central Oklahoma; OU Law School
- Occupation: Politician

Randy Terrill (born September 29, 1969) is an American politician. A Republican, he is a former member of the Oklahoma House of Representatives from Moore, Oklahoma.

== Early life and education ==
Terrill was born in Alva, Oklahoma, on September 29, 1969. He received a bachelor's degree in political science from the University of Central Oklahoma and a J.D. from the University of Oklahoma College of Law.

== Political career ==
Before being elected to office himself, Terrill had various political jobs, working "as a press intern for Governor Henry Bellmon, legislative assistant to former House Republican Leader Larry Ferguson, director of legislative research and special projects for Governor Frank Keating, political director of the Oklahoma Republican Party, and as special assistant to Labor Commissioner Brenda Reneau.

Terrill was first elected to the state House in 2004, representing a district in the Oklahoma City suburbs.

During his time in the state House, Terrill was known for his sponsorship of "English-only" legislation. Terrill was also known for his sponsorship of HB1804, a strict law targeting illegal immigration, that the Legislature enacted in 2007. The bill was backed by "Immigration Reform for Oklahoma Now" (IRON), an advocacy group that supported legislation to combat what it asserts to be an "illegal alien invasion of America." Terrill touted his legislation as "tougher than Arizona's anti-immigration law"; the measure required "police to determine the status of anyone they lawfully stop and also suspect is an illegal immigrant" and made it "a state crime to lack immigration papers."

In March 2011, Terrill was publicly reprimanded by the House in a 67-18 vote after being "accused of using profane language and threatening violence against" House Speaker Kris Steele, a fellow Republican. Terrill denied making threats or using profanity and characterized the reprimand as part of an "orchestrated attack" on him.

Terrill was re-elected to a fourth term in 2010; after being charged with bribery, Terrill did not seek reelection in 2012. In that year, Terrill unsuccessfully ran for Cleveland County commissioner, losing to Norman School Board member and former police captain Darry Stacy.

=== Bribery conviction ===
Terrill was a key figure in the 2010 Oklahoma political corruption investigation. In November 2011, a judge ruled that there was sufficient evidence to warrant a trial of Terrill for bribery. The charges involved Terrill's offer of a state job paying $80,000 to State Senator Debbe Leftwich (D-Oklahoma City) so that she would not run for reelection, clearing the way for State Representative Mike Christian (R-Oklahoma City) to run for the seat instead. In October 2013, a jury convicted Terrill of bribery. The jury recommended a sentence of one year in prison and a $5,000 fine. (Leftwich was convicted the same year of soliciting or accepting a bribe to withdraw as a candidate.)

In December 2014, Terrill was sentenced to one year in prison and a $5,000 fine. His sentence was upheld by the Oklahoma Court of Criminal Appeals and he entered prison in May 2015. He spent three months in prison and was then released to serve the rest of his sentence while wearing an ankle monitor, with "movements are restricted to his home and other locations agreed upon" by a probation officer.

== Personal life ==
Terrill is married and has one daughter and son. He and his wife declared bankruptcy in 2005. In 2008, a federal bankruptcy judge "ordered Terrill to pay $11,301 for failing to disclose loans to his campaign as an asset."

Terrill is a Baptist.
