= J. Roland Smith =

American politician (1933–2025)

Roland Smith

Member of the South Carolina House of Representatives from the 84th district
- In office March 1989 – December 2, 2014
- Preceded by: Billy Jones
- Succeeded by: Chris Corley

Personal details
- Born: February 26, 1933 Aiken, South Carolina, U.S.
- Died: June 30, 2025 (aged 92)
- Party: Republican (since 1993) Democratic (until 1993)
- Spouse: Peggy Cato
- Children: 3, including Garry R. Smith
- Occupation: Minister, postman

J. Roland Smith (February 26, 1933 – June 30, 2025) was an American politician who served in the South Carolina House of Representatives.

== Early life, education and career ==
A native of Aiken, South Carolina, Smith earned a Doctorate of Divinity at the Universal Bible Institute in Alamo, Tennessee and was a former Pentecostal minister and postman. He served in the United States Air Force during the Korean War, earning the National Defense Service Medal.

== Political career ==
Smith served the 84th District. He was first elected in 1989 as a Democrat, but switched to the Republican Party in 1993. He was a former chairman of the South Carolina House Ethics Committee, having held the position during an investigation of governor Nikki Haley in 2012. He announced his retirement on December 30, 2013.

== Personal life and death ==
Smith was married to Peggy Cato since 1953. They had three children, Garry, Todd and Caroline. The family lived in Warrenville, South Carolina.

Smith died on June 30, 2025, at the age of 92. Governor Henry McMaster announced that flags would be lowered in the late Representative's honor. On July 3, 2025, Executive Order 2025-25 was filed for that purpose.
