= Michael Brooks-Jimenez =

American politician

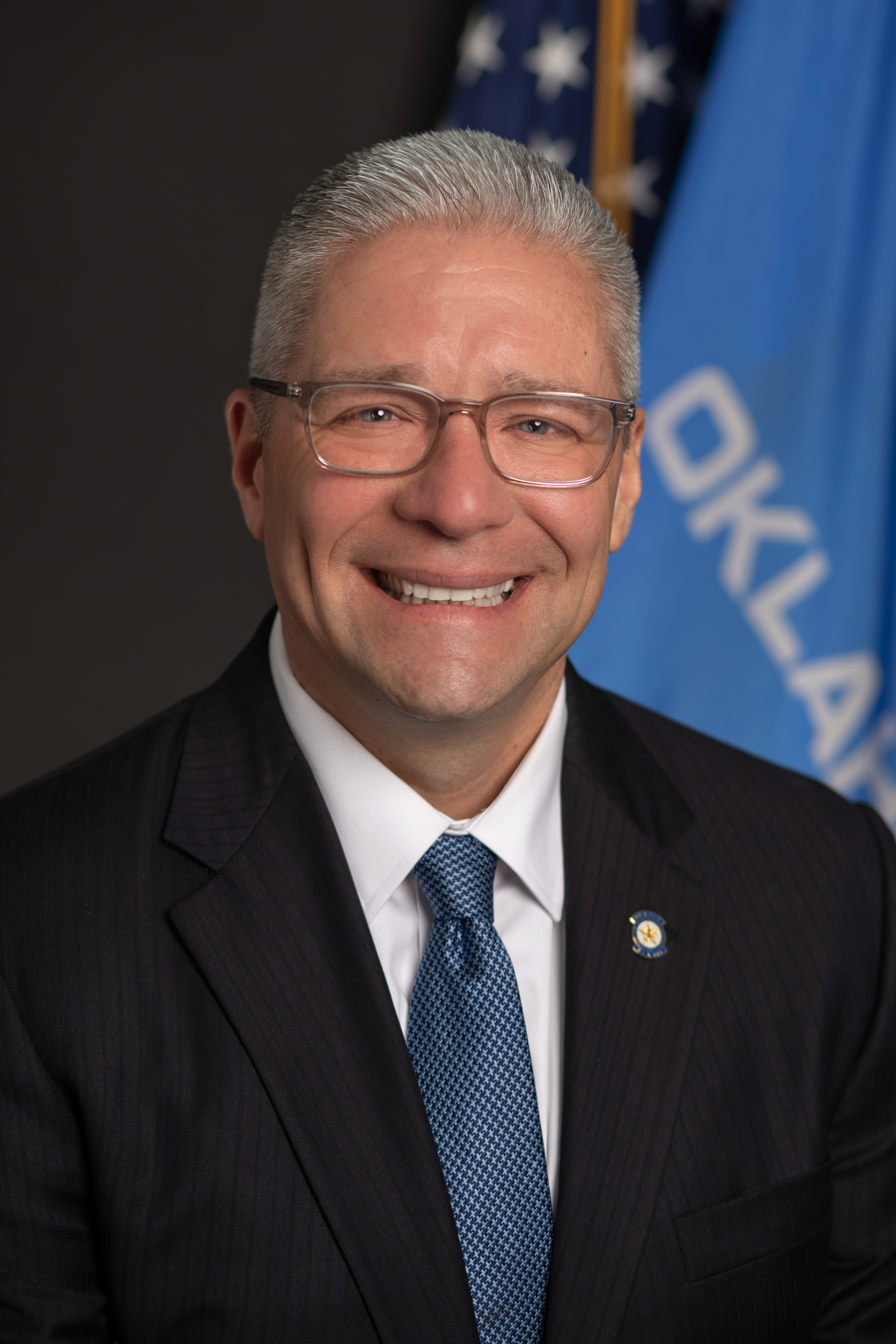

Minority Caucus Chair of the Oklahoma Senate
- Incumbent
- Assumed office December 11, 2024
- Preceded by: Kevin Matthews

Minority Caucus Vice Chair of the Oklahoma Senate
- In office 2018 – February 6, 2024
- Succeeded by: Carri Hicks

Member of the Oklahoma Senate from the 44th district
- Incumbent
- Assumed office July 11, 2017
- Preceded by: Ralph Shortey

Personal details
- Born: Michael Andrew Brooks-Jimenez Oklahoma City, Oklahoma, U.S.
- Party: Democratic
- Spouse: Jessica
- Children: 2
- Education: Oklahoma State University; University of Oklahoma College of Law

Michael Andrew Brooks-Jimenez is an American lawyer and Democratic member of the Oklahoma Senate. He was elected in a 2017 special election to fill the vacancy caused by the resignation of Ralph Shortey. He represents the 44th district, which covers parts of southern Oklahoma City.

== Personal life ==
Brooks-Jimenez was born in Oklahoma City to a white father, Bud Brooks, and a Mexican-American mother, Patricia Jimenez Brooks. Both were educators. He graduated from Mount St. Mary High School, and with a bachelor's degree from Oklahoma State University and a Juris Doctor from the University of Oklahoma College of Law. Brooks-Jimenez established a law firm, specializing in immigration law and Criminal Defense.

Brooks-Jimenez and his wife, Jessica Martinez-Brooks, have two children, Joaquin and Lucy. He is a Catholic and attends St. James Catholic Church.

== Political career ==
Brooks-Jimenez ran for the state Senate in 2014, losing to incumbent Republican Ralph Shortey. After Shortey resigned in March 2017 after being charged with child prostitution, Brooks-Jimenez declared his candidacy for the open seat. He defeated Republican Joe Griffin in the special election, held on July 11, 2017. His victory came as a surprise for the Democratic Party.

Brooks-Jimenez was the first Latino member of the Senate and is one of five in the Legislature. No candidates filed to run against Brooks-Jimenez in 2018 or 2022 primaries or general elections. He currently serves as Minority Caucus Chair. Brooks-Jimenez is also member of The National Association of Latino Elected Officials and the Board of Latino Legislative Leaders and was selected to be part of the New Deal Leaders in 2021. Brooks-Jimenez also founded the Oklahoma Latino Legislative Caucus in 2020.

== Political positions ==
Brooks-Jimenez believes illegal immigration is an issue best handled at the federal level, and supports rights of immigrants, both legal and illegal, residing in the United States. He prioritized education, the economy, and infrastructure in his 2014 campaign for the Senate.

== Electoral history ==
Oklahoma Senate District 44 election, 2014
Party	Candidate	Votes	%
Republican	Ralph Shortey	5,418	51.69
Democratic	Michael Brooks-Jimenez	4,384	41.82
Nonpartisan	Constance Fawcett	680	6.49
Total votes		10,482	100.00

Oklahoma Senate District 44 special election, 2017
Party	Candidate	Votes	%
Democratic	Michael Brooks-Jimenez	1,975	54.57
Republican	Joe Griffin	1,644	45.43
Total votes		3,619	100.00
