= Milton Otho Alexander =

American politician (1923–2013)

Member of the South Carolina House of Representatives from the 27th district
- In office 1983–1994
- Preceded by: Samuel Hunter Howard, Jr.
- Succeeded by: Michael Easterday

Personal details
- Born: August 1, 1923 Calhoun, South Carolina
- Died: March 23, 2013 (aged 89)

Milton Otho 'M.O.' Alexander (August 1, 1923 – March 23, 2013) was an American politician.

== Early life, education and career ==
Alexander served in the United States Army during World War II, from 1943 to 1946. After returning from service, he completed a Bachelor of Science degree in Vocational Agricultural Education from Clemson University in 1948.

Alexander earned a master's degree in Education from the University of South Carolina in 1953, and taught agriculture for 32 years, as a teacher in Simpsonville, South Carolina schools and a principal at Simpsonville High School.

== Political career ==
Alexander was elected to the South Carolina House of Representatives from the 27th District in 1983, remaining in office for six terms.

== Honors and recognitions ==
Alexander received the Clemson University Centennial Distinguished Alumni Award in 1989.
