= Jack Manning =

Jack Manning may refer to:

- Jack Manning (baseball) (1853–1929), American baseball player
- Jack Manning (footballer) (1886–1946), English footballer
- Jack Manning (actor) (1916–2009), American film, stage and television actor
- Jack Manning (cricketer) (1923–1988), Australian cricketer
- Jack Manning (architect) (1929–2021), New Zealand architect

== Others ==
- Jack Manning (One Life to Live), fictional character on the American soap opera One Life to Live

== See also ==
- John Manning (disambiguation)
