= HB1804 =

Oklahoma State Legislature
- Full name: Oklahoma Taxpayer and Citizen Protection Act 2007
- Introduced: February 5, 2007
- House voted: May 1, 2007 (84–14)
- Senate voted: April 16, 2007 (41–6)
- Signed into law: May 8, 2007
- Sponsor: Randy Terrill
- Governor: Brad Henry
- Code: Title 21 (Crimes and Punishment); Title 22 (Criminal Procedure); Title 25 (Definitions and General Procedure); Title 56 (Poor Persons); Title 68 (Revenue and Taxation); Title 70 (Schools); Title 74 (State Government)
- Bill: HB-1804
- Website: Oklahoma Taxpayer and Citizen Protection Act 2007

Oklahoma House Bill 1804, officially known as the Oklahoma Taxpayer and Citizen Protection Act 2007, is a strict anti-illegal immigration law introduced by State Representative Randy Terrill, a Republican from Moore, OK.

HB-1804 makes it a felony even to give a person a ride if they know or have grounds to suspect them of being an illegal immigrant. It also forbids the state from providing education, health care and many other services to undocumented immigrants, including infants, and requires police to check the immigration status of anyone "suspected" of being in this country illegally.

== Legislative history ==
- February 5, 2007 – Introduced in Oklahoma House of Representatives by Republican State Representative Randy Terrill.
- March 1, 2007 – Approved by House Judiciary and Public Safety Committee
- March 7, 2007 – Approved by full House of Representatives 88–9
- March 8, 2007 – Introduced in Oklahoma Senate by Republican State Senator James Allen Williamson.
- April 3, 2007 – Amended version approved by Senate Judiciary Committee
- April 16, 2007 – Amended version approved by full Senate 41–6
- May 1, 2007 – Amended version approved by full House of Representatives 84–14
- May 8, 2007 – Signed into law by Democratic Governor of Oklahoma Brad Henry

Though proposed by Republican members of the Oklahoma State Legislature, 35 of the 44 House Democrats and 16 of 24 Senate Democrats joined their Republican colleagues to approve the bill, which was ultimately signed into law by a Democratic governor.

== Provisions ==
=== Section 1 – Official Name ===
Section 1 of HB1804 provided that the official name of the bill was to be the "Oklahoma Taxpayer and Citizen Protection Act of 2007".

=== Section 2 – Legislative Purpose ===
Section 2 of HB1804 provided the intent of the Legislature:

The State of Oklahoma finds that illegal immigration is causing economic hardship and lawlessness in this state and that illegal immigration is encouraged when public agencies within this state provide public benefits without verifying immigration status. The State of Oklahoma further finds that when illegal immigrants have been harbored and sheltered in this state and encouraged to reside in this state through the issuance of identification cards that are issued without verifying immigration status, these practices impede and obstruct the enforcement of federal immigration law, undermine the security of our borders, and impermissibly restrict the privileges and immunities of the citizens of Oklahoma. Therefore, the people of the State of Oklahoma declare that it is a compelling public interest of this state to discourage illegal immigration by requiring all agencies within this state to fully cooperate with federal immigration authorities in the enforcement of federal immigration laws. The State of Oklahoma also finds that other measures are necessary to ensure the integrity of various governmental programs and services.

— Oklahoma Taxpayer and Citizen Protection Act of 2007

=== Section 3 – Criminal Provisions ===
Section 3 of HB1804 makes it a felony in Oklahoma, punishable by no less than one year's imprisonment by the Oklahoma Department of Corrections or/and a $1,000 fine, to:

- Transport, move, or attempt to transport any illegal alien
- Conceal, harbor, or shelter from detection by law enforcement any illegal alien

=== Section 4 – Identification Cards ===
Section 4 of HB1804 prevents any State agency, local government, or public school district from issuing any form of identification card to an illegal alien, including voter ID cards, driver licenses, and birth certificates.

=== Section 5 – Felon Verification ===
Section 5 of HB1804 requires that any State or local law enforcement agency which arrests a person for a felony or for driving under the influence must check the citizenship status of the person so arrested. Any person who cannot be verified as a legal resident of the United States must be reported to the United States Department of Homeland Security.

=== Section 6 – Definitions ===
Section 6 of HB1804 provides definitions for several words as they are used in HB1804.

=== Section 7 – Government Employees and Contracting ===
Section 7 of HB1804 provides that all State agencies, local governments, and school districts must employ the United States Department of Homeland Security's E-Verify program to verify the immigration status of all new employees.

Beginning July 1, 2008, no contractor may bid for any State or local government contract unless such contractor participates in the E-Verify program.

Beginning July 1, 2008, it shall be an illegal discriminatory practice for any public or private employer to terminate the employment of a legal resident while retaining the employment of an illegal alien. This particular provision has been struck from the law following a federal court challenge.

=== Section 8 – Public Benefits ===
Section 8 of HB1804 requires that every State agency and local government to verify the immigration status of all applications 14 years of age or older for State or local welfare benefits with the United States Department of Homeland Security, preventing the provision of such benefits to illegal immigrants except in rare circumstances.

Every person who receives welfare benefits, in order to receive such benefits, must sign an affidavit attesting to their lawful residency within the United States. Any false affidavit constitutes perjury punishable by imprisonment by the Oklahoma Department of Corrections for up to 5 years.

=== Section 9 – Independent Contractors ===
Section 9 of HB1804 requires that for any independent contractor which fails to provide employment verification to the contracting entity the contracting entity must withhold state income tax at the top marginal rate for the compensation paid to the independent contractor. Any contracting entity which fails to withhold such tax shall be liable for such tax.

This section has been struck from the law following a federal court challenge.

=== Section 10 – Enforcement of Federal Immigration Laws ===
Section 10 of HB1804 directs the Oklahoma Attorney General to enter into a memorandum of understanding between the State and the United States Department of Justice and the United States Department of Homeland Security to authorize State and local law enforcement agencies to enforce Federal immigration and customs laws, detention and removals, and investigations.

All local governments are prohibited in any way from preventing, prohibiting, or hindering local law enforcement agencies from communication or cooperating with Federal officials regarding immigration verification or enforcement.

=== Section 11 – Education Benefits ===
Section 11 of HB1804 provides that no illegal immigrant may receive resident-level tuition at any college or university within the State or receive post-secondary scholarships or financial aid.

=== Section 12 -Fraudulent Documents Identification Unit ===
Section 12 of HB1804 established the Fraudulent Documents Identification Unit of the Oklahoma Department of Public Safety to investigate and apprehend those who sale or distribute fraudulent identification documents.

=== Section 13 – Resident Tuition ===
Section 13 of HB1804 makes technical amendments to the procedure used to determine those eligible to receive lower residency tuition at any college or university within the State make establishing stricter requirements for determining lawful residency.

== Repercussions ==
In October 2007, the National Coalition of Latino Clergy filed a federal lawsuit, seeking to overturn the bill on the grounds that it was unconstitutional and violated rights to due process, but this was finally dismissed in December 2007 because the plaintiffs named in the suit didn't have standing to challenge the law.

In November 2007, CNN reported that many in Oklahoma's Latino community were staying home, fearful that police would arrest and deport them, and that this was impacting heavily on local businesses.

In June 2008, a federal judge issued an injunction against implementation of two parts of the bill which deal with the requirement of an employer to verify a worker's eligibility, and the requirement for businesses to verify the work authorization status of independent contractors. In December 2012, a final judgment was entered in the case following an appellate ruling, which preserves the requirement for government contractors to participate in E-Verify, but strikes the tax penalties for unverified independent contractors in Section 9 and the discrimination liability for retaining illegal aliens from Section 7.

== External sources ==
- Full text of the bill. (PDF)
- HB 1804 at Oklahoma state legislature
