= Gary Wheaton =

Member of the New Hampshire House of Representatives

Gary Wheaton is a Canadian-born American businessman and politician. He served in the New Hampshire House of Representatives from December 1, 2010, to April 6, 2011

== Background ==
Wheaton grew up in Manchester, New Hampshire. He worked many years in the high-tech business arena. He also served in the United States military.

== Political career ==
Wheaton is a former Republican member of the New Hampshire House of Representatives from Seabrook, New Hampshire.

New Hampshire House of Representatives
Preceded by E. Albert Weare; Mark F. Preston	Member of the New Hampshire House of Representatives from the 14th Rockingham district 2010–2011; Served alongside: Amy Stasia Perkins, Lawrence B. "Koko" Perkins, Jr., Glenn F. Ritter	Succeeded by Kevin M. Janvrin
