= Keith Leftwich =

American politician

Member of the Oklahoma Senate from the 44th district
- In office 1990–2003
- Preceded by: Kay Dudley
- Succeeded by: Debbe Leftwich

Member of the Oklahoma House of Representatives from the 91 district
- In office 1982–1989
- Preceded by: Charles Gray

Personal details
- Born: July 6, 1954
- Died: September 19, 2003 (aged 49)
- Spouse: Debbe Leftwich

Keith Clayton Leftwich (July 6, 1954 – September 19, 2003), was a State Representative and State Senator for Oklahoma.

Born to John V. and Paulyne Leftwich at Tinker Air Force Base Hospital, Leftwich graduated from Choctaw High School in 1972. One of his accomplishments there was receiving the William Randolph Hearst Award for High School Seniors. As a student at the University of Oklahoma, he was the recipient of the Nora Wells Award for Outstanding Junior Man and served in Student Congress. He graduated from Oklahoma City University with a degree in liberal arts.

He started his public political career in 1978 by running for a State Representative seat in South Oklahoma City (then District 91), losing in the Democratic runoff election to Charles Gray, who won the general election. In 1982, when Gray decided not to run for re-election, Leftwich ran and won the primary, runoff, and general elections. During the three terms that he served (1983 to 1989), he was chair of the Committee of Government Operations, as well as chair of the interim Committee of Legislative Procedures. One of his interests while in the Oklahoma State House of Representative was reform of the corrections system. He decided to forgo re-election in 1988 in order to run for State Corporation Commissioner, but lost in the runoff to Charles Morgan.

After his career in the Oklahoma House of Representatives, Leftwich was executive vice-president of the Del City Chamber of Commerce. In 1990, he ran for District 44 seat of the Oklahoma State Senate, in which he won the primary and defeated the Republican incumbent State Sen. Kay Dudley. During his career in the State Senate, he served as Chairman for the transportation committee, as well as general government and a transportation subcommittee on appropriations. He Later was elected by the Democratic Caucus to serve as majority whip. Although Leftwich was frequently mentioned as a candidate for the Democratic Party nomination for Governor of Oklahoma in the 2002 election, he declined to enter the race and supported Brad Henry.

In January 2002, he held a press conference in which he announced he had contracted neck cancer. However, he was re-elected that year. Following his death from cancer, his widow Debbe Leftwich won the special election on December 9, 2003 to succeed him.

On March 25, 2004, the library at Oklahoma City Community College was dedicated as the Keith Leftwich Memorial Library. Later, a portion of Interstate 240 between Interstate 35 and Interstate 44 was dedicated as the Keith Leftwich Memorial Loop.
