= Kyle Tasker =

American politician (born 1985)

Member of the New Hampshire House of Representatives
- In office December 2, 2010 – March 9, 2016
- Preceded by: Maureen Mann
- Succeeded by: Jim Nasser
- Constituency: Rockingham 1 (2010–2012); Rockingham 2 (2012–2016)

Personal details
- Born: June 6, 1985 (age 41)
- Party: Republican

Kyle J. Tasker (born June 6, 1985) is an American politician who served in the New Hampshire House of Representatives. He courted controversy a number of times while in office, including an incident where he dropped a gun during a committee meeting and one where he joked on Facebook about domestic violence. In 2016, during his third term, he was arrested on drug possession and sex crime charges and resigned a few days later. It was later reported by the New Hampshire Attorney General's office that he sold marijuana to a number of his fellow lawmakers. While released on bail, he was involved in a car accident and was rearrested for driving under the influence.
