= George Pabey =

Mayor of East Chicago, Indiana
- In office October 2004 – September 24, 2010
- Preceded by: Robert Pastrick
- Succeeded by: Charles Pacurar (acting)

George Pabey is a former mayor of East Chicago, Indiana, United States. He was elected into office in an October 2004 special election, and assumed office in January 2005. On September 24, 2010, he was removed from office after being found guilty in a federal court of conspiracy and theft of government funds.

One of seven children born to Puerto Rican immigrants, he became the city's first Hispanic mayor. His service to the city began in the capacity of police officer in 1972, and he was promoted to Chief of Police in 1990. He entered politics in 1999, winning a seat on the city's Common Council.

His tenure as mayor began in 2005, after he defeated longtime mayor Robert Pastrick in a special election called after Pabey mounted a legal challenge to the 2003 Municipal Election results, alleging widespread voter fraud. There were allegations of fraud against Pastrick when absentee ballots appeared skewed in the 33-year incumbent's favor. Although Pastrick was never indicted, other city officials were sent to jail in the ensuing federal investigation of misuse of public funds in an alleged vote-buying scheme frequently referred to as "Sidewalks for Votes". As a result of the Attorney General's suit, Pastrick and two former aids were ordered to repay $108 million in civil damages in March 2010. Attorney General Greg Zoeller said U.S. District Judge James Moody's decision marked the first time a city government had been adjudged a corrupt organization under federal racketeering laws.

Pabey was indicted for misuse of public funds on February 3, 2010, and faces at least five federal counts.

Pabey was convicted by a federal court jury on September 24, 2010, of conspiracy and theft of government funds. A sentencing date was not set. His attorney told local media after the verdict was handed down that he will appeal his client's conviction. City Controller Charles Pacurar was automatically named interim mayor under Indiana state law that requires elected officials convicted of criminal charges to step down from office. A Lake County Democratic Party East Chicago precinct caucus replaced Pabey with Anthony Copeland, until the 2011 mayoral elections.

Pabey is married with two children.
