= John Manning (New Hampshire politician) =

American politician

Member of New Hampshire House of Representatives for Rockingham 8
- In office December 3, 2014 – December 4, 2018
- Succeeded by: Fred Doucette

Member of New Hampshire House of Representatives
- In office 2002–2006

Personal details
- Party: Republican

John J. Manning Jr. is an American politician. He was a member of the New Hampshire House of Representatives from 2002 to 2006, and again from 2014 to 2018.

In March 2018, he was indicted on two counts of welfare fraud.
