= 2010 Oklahoma political corruption investigation =

The 2010 Oklahoma political corruption investigation was a criminal investigation that focused on whether Oklahoma State Representative Randy Terrill (R-Moore), State Representative Mike Christian (R-Oklahoma City), and State Senator Debbe Leftwich (D-Oklahoma City) engaged in political corruption involving the Office of the Oklahoma Chief Medical Examiner.

== Background ==
The Office of the Chief Medical Examiner (OCME) had suffered from a large backlog of cases due to a low number of physicians. In early 2010, the Board of Medicolegal Investigations, which is the governing body of OCME, placed Chief Medical Examiner Dr. Collie Trant, M.D., on administrative leave for undisclosed reasons. Within days, the Board terminated Dr. Trant.

Soon after Dr. Trants' termination, Governor of Oklahoma Brad Henry directed State Health Commissioner Terry Cline to review the operations of OCEM and make a report recommending both operational and statutory changes. In late March, Commissioner Cline released his report on OCME. In his report, Cline recommended both greater oversight authority on the part of the Medicolegal Investigations Board as well as restructuring the organization of OCME. Cline outline three models for possible reorganization but recommended the model that made the most sweeping changes. Under currently State law, the Chief Medical Examiner, who must be a licensed physician, is the executive head of OCME, responsible for all operations and administration of the agency. Cline recommended that State law be changed to establish a non-physician Administrator as head of OCME who would be responsible for all agency operations, with the position of Chief Medical Examiner overseeing all medical operations and reporting to the Administrator. Cline pointed to the Oklahoma Department of Mental Health and Substance Abuse Services and the Oklahoma State Department of Health as examples of this model.

Following the release of Cline's report, President pro tempore of the Oklahoma Senate Glenn Coffee and Speaker of the Oklahoma House of Representatives Chris Benge proposed Senate Bill 738 which would have enacted many of Cline's recommendations, including the establishment of a Transition Coordinator. The Transition Coordinator, as provided by SB738, was to oversee the transition of OCME from its current location in Oklahoma City to Edmond and received an annual salary of $80,000. SB738 passed the Senate 45-0 and passed House of Representatives 58–40.

Immediately following the passage of SB738, Democratic State Senator Debbe Leftwich announced that she would not seek reelection. On the same day, Republican State Representative Mike Christian announced that he would seek Leftwich's seat.

Citing legislative misconduct, Governor Henry vetoed SB738 on June 6 after being briefed by Oklahoma County District Attorney David Prater on his ongoing investigation over political corruption involving that bill. Days later, DA Prater announced that he had launched a political corruption investigation of State Representative Randy Terrill (R-Moore), State Senator Leftwich and State Representative Christian over allegations that those legislators conspired to use SB738 to create a state job specifically for Senator Leftwich in OCME in exchange for her agreeing not to seek re-election. This, according to allegations, would make way for Representative Christian to fill her vacant Senate seat.

== Timeline ==
- January 2009 - The Board appointed Dr. Collie Trant, M.D., to serve as the Chief Medical Examiner.
- February 2, 2010 - The Board placed Dr. Trant on administrative leave with pay.
- February 5 - Dr. Trant's employment is terminated by the Board. No reason was given by the Board for Dr. Trant's termination.
- February 10 - Governor Brad Henry directs State Health Commissioner Terry Cline to review the OCME
- February 16 - Dr. Trant filed a whistle-blower lawsuit against the State of Oklahoma.
- March 23 - State Health Commissioner Terry Cline releases his report on OCME and recommends several changes, including a restructure of the agency
- March 31 - Oklahoma State Representative Randy Terrill (R-Moore) launched a legislative investigation into the operations of the OCME
- May 24 - OCME Chief Administrative Officer Tom Jordan, the highest-ranking officer at the OCME at the time, announces his resignation effective June 14 after only six months on the job
- May 27 - Senate Bill 738, approving many of the changes recommended by Commissioner Cline, passes the Senate 45–0 and passed House of Representatives 58-40
- June 5 - The Board appoints Dr. Andrew Sibley, a 48-year-old senior forensic pathologist with the OCME's Tulsa Office, as Interim Chief Medical Examiner
- June 6 - Citing legislative misconduct, Governor Henry vetoed SB 738 after being briefed by Oklahoma County District Attorney David Prater on his ongoing investigation over political corruption involving the legislation
- June 8 - Oklahoma County District Attorney David Prater launched a political corruption investigation of State Representative Randy Terrill (R-Moore), State Senator Debbe Leftwich (D-Oklahoma City) and State Representative Mike Christian (R-Oklahoma City) over allegations of those legislators conspiring use SB738 to create a state job specifically for Senator Leftwich in OCME in exchange for her agreeing not to seek re-election, making way for Representative Christian to fill her vacant Senate seat
- June 9 - Reports from the Oklahoma State Bureau of Investigation surface showing that Interim Chief Medical Examiner Dr. Sibley was the subject of a sexual harassment lawsuit while he lived in Tucson, Arizona and another sexual harassment lawsuit from a fellow employee during Sibley's tenure at the OCME's Tulsa Office
- August 16–18 – DA Prater, with the permission of Oklahoma Attorney General Drew Edmondson, convenes a grand jury to review the evidence of the political corruption case.
