= Chris Corley =

American politician (born 1980)

Member of the South Carolina House of Representatives from the 84th district
- In office December 2, 2014 – January 24, 2017
- Preceded by: J. Roland Smith
- Succeeded by: Ronnie Young

Personal details
- Born: Christopher Aaron Corley; September 12, 1980 (age 46) Augusta, Georgia, U.S.
- Party: Republican
- Spouse: Heather Medlock Corley
- Children: 3
- Profession: Politician, Lawyer
- Known for: domestic violence, Modern display of the Confederate flag

Christopher Aaron Corley (born September 12, 1980) is an American politician. He is a former member of the South Carolina House of Representatives from the 84th District, serving from 2014 to 2017. He is a member of the Republican Party.

Corley resigned from the State House in early 2017 amid domestic violence allegations, to which he pled guilty. He resigned his seat before expulsion hearings could begin.

== Early life and career ==
Corley was born in Augusta, Georgia to Kyle Corley and Shirley Corley on September 12, 1980. Corley graduated from Midland Valley High School in 1998, from the University of South Carolina Aiken in 2002 with a degree in political science, and in 2008 from the University of South Carolina School of Law.

He was previously the youngest registered lobbyist in Washington, D.C. He also owned the Law Offices of Christopher Corley in Augusta, Georgia. Corley lives in Graniteville with his wife and three children.

== Electoral history ==
In 2014, Corley defeated Adam Mestres, Rick Turnbull, and Lance Weaver in the Republican primary for the 84th district, which includes an area of South Carolina northeast of Augusta, across the Savannah River. Corley defeated Rosie Berry in the general election. In the 2016 South Carolina House of Representatives election, Corley ran unopposed. Corley has served on the Agriculture, Natural Resources, and Environmental Affairs committees.

== Political positions ==
Corley introduced a series of bills proposing drug testing for recipients of Supplemental Nutrition Assistance Program (SNAP) assistance, as well as limiting the benefits that able-bodied adults can receive. Corley supported a law granting reciprocity to gun owners from Georgia, as well as a failed effort to allow reciprocity for all concealed weapons permits. Corley had previously expressed skepticism about laws restricting individuals accused or convicted of domestic violence from possessing firearms.

During the 2016 Republican presidential primaries, Corley supported then-candidate Donald Trump and was his co-chairman in Aiken County.

== Confederate flag controversy ==
Corley is an opponent of South Carolina Governor Nikki Haley, the governor having previously implored "anyone" to run against Corley during his re-election campaign. In July 2015, he suggested the State of South Carolina should fly a white flag of surrender on the State House grounds in place of the Confederate Flag which was removed by the South Carolina General Assembly following the Charleston church shooting. Corley later sent Christmas cards featuring the Confederate Flag to his fellow Republican lawmakers, suggesting they "take this joyous time as an opportunity to ask for forgiveness of all your sins such as betrayal".

== Admission of guilt in domestic abuse ==
In December 2016, during an argument with his wife in which she accused him of infidelity, Corley allegedly punched her in the face, pointed a Smith & Wesson SD9 VE 9mm pistol at her, and threatened to kill her in the presence of two of their children. Corley was arrested and charged with first-degree criminal domestic violence. Following a hearing, he was released on bond. The felony charges carry a maximum penalty of 10 years in prison. Corley could also have been suspended from the House of Representatives.

On January 4, 2017, Corley was indicted on domestic violence and weapons charges and suspended from duties of office. He could have faced up to 25 years in prison. Later that month, on January 24, Corley resigned from the South Carolina House of Representatives. On August 7, 2017, Corley pled guilty to charges of first degree domestic violence and in exchange was given five years probation.
