= Debbe Leftwich =

American politician

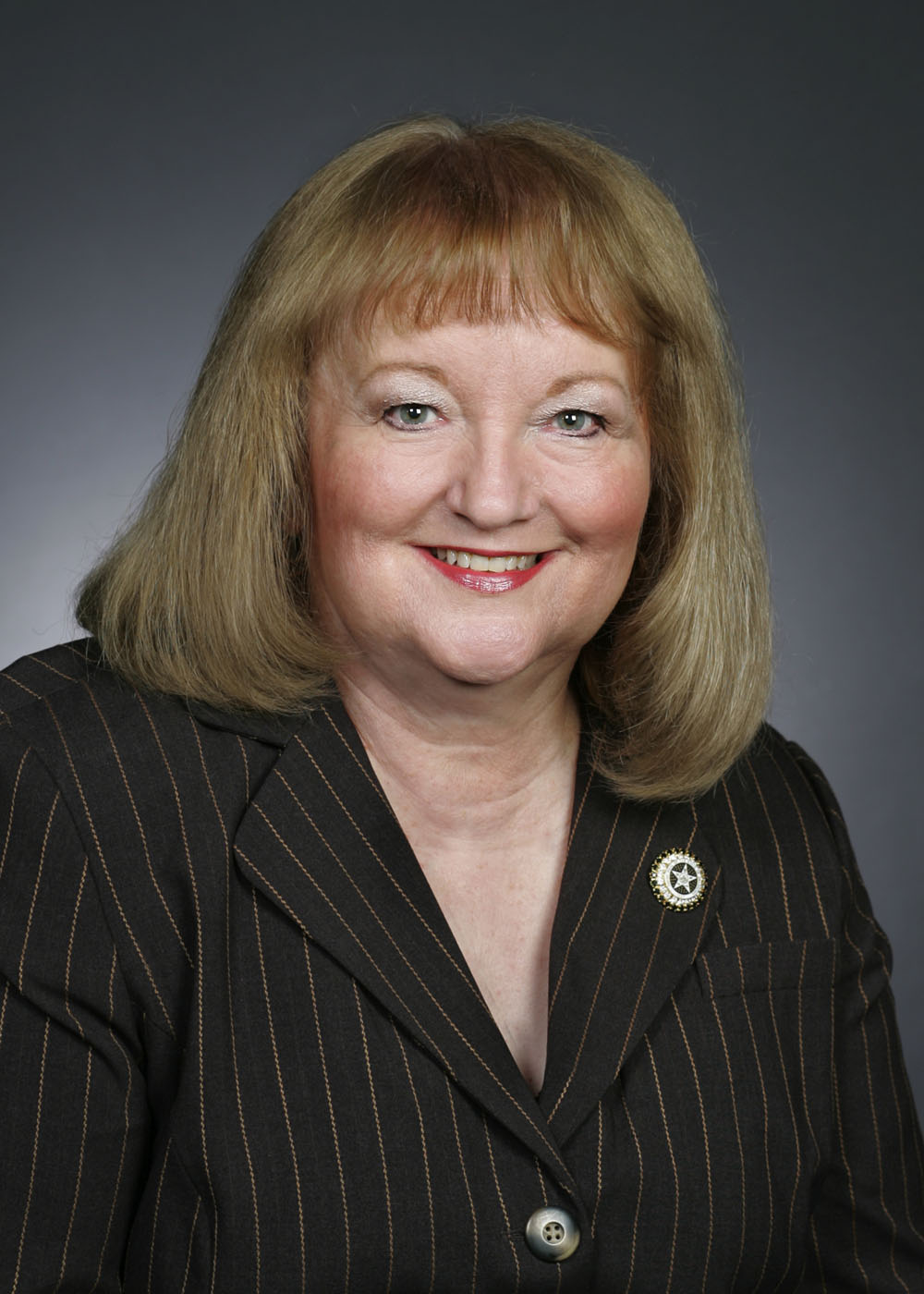

Member of the Oklahoma Senate from the 44th district
- In office 2003–2010
- Preceded by: Keith Leftwich
- Succeeded by: Ralph Shortey
- Constituency: 44th Senate District

Personal details
- Born: Chandler, Oklahoma, U.S.
- Party: Democratic
- Spouse: Widowed (Senator Keith Leftwich)
- Children: Kevin and Kurt
- Website: Senate website

Debbe Leftwich is a politician from the U.S. state of Oklahoma. Leftwich was a member of the Oklahoma Senate from 2003 until 2010. She won the vacant seat through a special election after the death of her husband and former senator Keith Leftwich. She was a key figure in the 2010 Oklahoma political corruption investigation for her role in a bribery scheme in which she was accused of agreeing to not run for re-election in 2010 in exchange for a state job with the Office of the Chief Medical Examiner (OCME).

== Early life ==
Born in Chandler, Oklahoma, Leftwitch grew up in Wellston, Oklahoma where she graduated from Wellston High School. Leftwich's interest in politics began in high school with various mentors encouraging her passion. She went on to attend Oklahoma Baptist University and the University of Central Oklahoma.

== Political career ==
She was elected in a special election on December 9, 2003 to fill the vacancy from District 44 left by her husband, Senator Keith Leftwich, who died of cancer in September 2003. Leftwich was re-elected in 2006.

== Senate Committees ==
Leftwich remained in office from 2003 until 2010.

- Appropriations Subcommittee on Public Safety and Judiciary
- Business and Labor - Co-Chair
- Criminal Jurisprudence
- Health and Human Resources
- Transportation

=== Corruption ===
Leftwich was a key figure in the 2010 Oklahoma political corruption investigation.

== Boards, committees and commissions ==
Aside from her service in the Oklahoma Legislature, Leftwich spent her time serving in a number of various organizations, including:

- Chair of the Oklahoma Breast and Cervical Cancer Prevention and Treatment Advisory Committee
- Co-chair of Oklahoma Women’s Legislative Caucus
- Co-chair of Oklahoma’s Cancer Caucus
- Member of the Oklahoma Commission on Children & Youth’s Interagency Coordinating Council for Early Childhood Intervention
- Member of the Small Business Regulatory Review Committee
- Member of the Department of Labor’s Worker Safety Policy Council
- Governor’s appointee to the Oklahoma Health Information Security & Privacy Collaboration Steering Committee
- Member of the Oklahoma Commission on the Status of Women
- Member of the SKIL Board
- Member of the League of Women Voters
- Member of the American Legion Auxiliary
- Member of the South OKC Chamber of Commerce

== Personal life ==
Leftwich and her late husband have two sons, Kevin and Kurt.
