= 2002 United States House of Representatives elections in Ohio =

- November 5, 2002

All 18 Ohio seats to the United States House of Representatives
| | Majority party | Minority party |
|---|---|---|
| Party | Republican | Democratic |
| Last election | 11 | 8 |
| Seats won | 12 | 6 |
| Seat change | ▲1 | ▼2 |
| Popular vote | 1,775,555 | 1,383,889 |
| Percentage | 55.31% | 43.11% |
| Swing | ▲6.57% | ▼2.68% |

Republican
50–60%
60–70%
70–80%
90<%
Democratic
50–60%
60–70%
70–80%

The 2002 United States House of Representatives elections in Ohio were held on Tuesday, November 5, 2002, to elect the 18 U.S. representatives from the state of Ohio, one from each of the state's 18 congressional districts. The elections coincided with the elections of other federal and state offices. Ohio lost a seat from the 2000 census.

== Overview ==
United States House of Representatives elections in Ohio, 2002
| Party | Votes | Percentage | Seats before | Seats after | +/– |
|---|---|---|---|---|---|
| Republican | 1,775,555 | 55.31% | 11 | 12 | +1 |
| Democratic | 1,383,889 | 43.11% | 8 | 6 | -2 |
| Independent | 50,854 | 1.58% | 0 | 0 | - |
| Totals | 3,210,298 | 100% | 19 | 18 | -1 |

== District 1 ==
2002 Ohio's 1st congressional district election
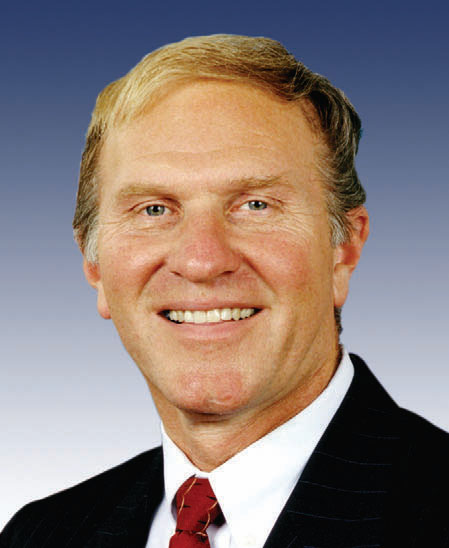

| Nominee | Steve Chabot | Greg Harris |
| Party | Republican | Democratic |
| Popular vote | 110,760 | 60,168 |
| Percentage | 64.8% | 35.2% |
- County results Chabot: 60–70% 70–80%
U.S. Representative before election
Steve Chabot
Republican
Elected U.S. Representative
Steve Chabot
Republican

=== Predictions ===
| Source | Ranking | As of |
|---|---|---|
| Sabato's Crystal Ball | Safe R | November 4, 2002 |
| New York Times | Safe R | October 14, 2002 |

=== General election results ===
Ohio's 1st Congressional District election, 2002
| Party | Candidate | Votes | % |
|---|---|---|---|
| Republican | Steve Chabot (Incumbent) | 110,760 | 64.80 |
| Democratic | Greg Harris | 60,168 | 35.20 |
| Total votes | | 170,928 | 100 |
| Republican hold | | | |

== District 2 ==
2002 Ohio's 2nd congressional district election

| Nominee | Rob Portman | Charles W. Sanders |
| Party | Republican | Democratic |
| Popular vote | 139,218 | 48,785 |
| Percentage | 74.0% | 25.9% |
- County results Portman: 50–60% 70–80% 80–90% Sanders: 50–60%
U.S. Representative before election
Rob Portman
Republican
Elected U.S. Representative
Rob Portman
Republican

=== Predictions ===
| Source | Ranking | As of |
|---|---|---|
| Sabato's Crystal Ball | Safe R | November 4, 2002 |
| New York Times | Safe R | October 14, 2002 |

=== General election results ===
Ohio's 2nd Congressional District election, 2002
| Party | Candidate | Votes | % |
|---|---|---|---|
| Republican | Rob Portman (Incumbent) | 139,218 | 74.04 |
| Democratic | Charles W. Sanders | 48,785 | 25.95 |
| Independent | James J. Condit, Jr. (Write-in) | 13 | 0.01 |
| Total votes | | 188,016 | 100 |
| Republican hold | | | |

== District 3 ==
2002 Ohio's 3rd congressional district election
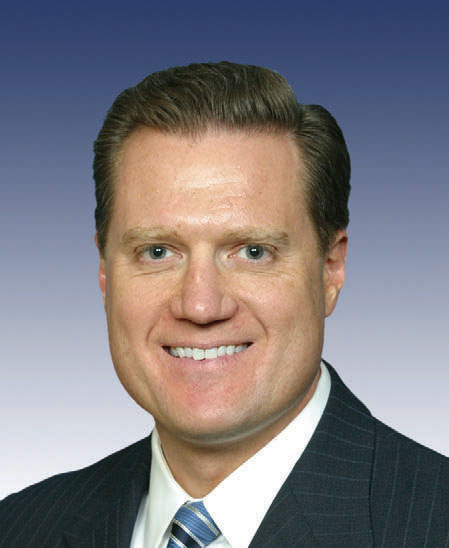

| Nominee | Mike Turner | Rick Carne |
| Party | Republican | Democratic |
| Popular vote | 111,630 | 78,307 |
| Percentage | 58.8% | 41.2% |
- County results Turner: 50–60% 60–70% 70–80%
U.S. Representative before election
Tony P. Hall
Democratic
Elected U.S. Representative
Mike Turner
Republican

=== Predictions ===
| Source | Ranking | As of |
|---|---|---|
| Sabato's Crystal Ball | Lean R (flip) | November 4, 2002 |
| New York Times | Safe R (flip) | October 14, 2002 |

=== General election results ===
Ohio's 3rd Congressional District election, 2002
| Party | Candidate | Votes | % |
|---|---|---|---|
| Republican | Mike Turner | 111,630 | 58.77 |
| Democratic | Rick Carne | 78,307 | 41.22 |
| Independent | Ronald Williamitis (Write-in) | 14 | 0.01 |
| Total votes | | 189,951 | 100 |
| Republican gain from Democratic | | | |

== District 4 ==
2002 Ohio's 4th congressional district election
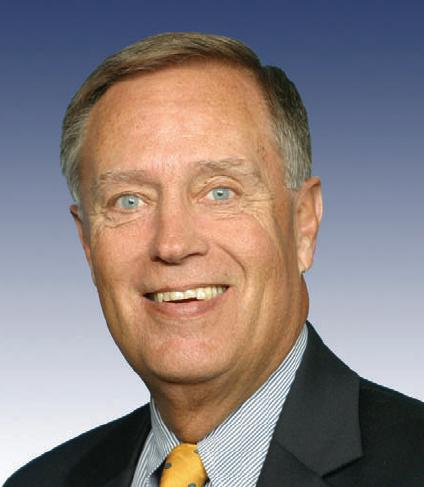

| Nominee | Mike Oxley | Jim Clark |
| Party | Republican | Democratic |
| Popular vote | 120,001 | 57,726 |
| Percentage | 67.5% | 32.5% |
- County results Oxley: 60–70% 70–80%
U.S. Representative before election
Mike Oxley
Republican
Elected U.S. Representative
Mike Oxley
Republican

=== Predictions ===
| Source | Ranking | As of |
|---|---|---|
| Sabato's Crystal Ball | Safe R | November 4, 2002 |
| New York Times | Safe R | October 14, 2002 |

=== General election results ===
Ohio's 4th Congressional District election, 2002
| Party | Candidate | Votes | % |
|---|---|---|---|
| Republican | Mike Oxley (Incumbent) | 120,001 | 67.52 |
| Democratic | Jim Clark | 57,726 | 32.48 |
| Total votes | | 177,727 | 100 |
| Republican hold | | | |

== District 5 ==
2002 Ohio's 5th congressional district election
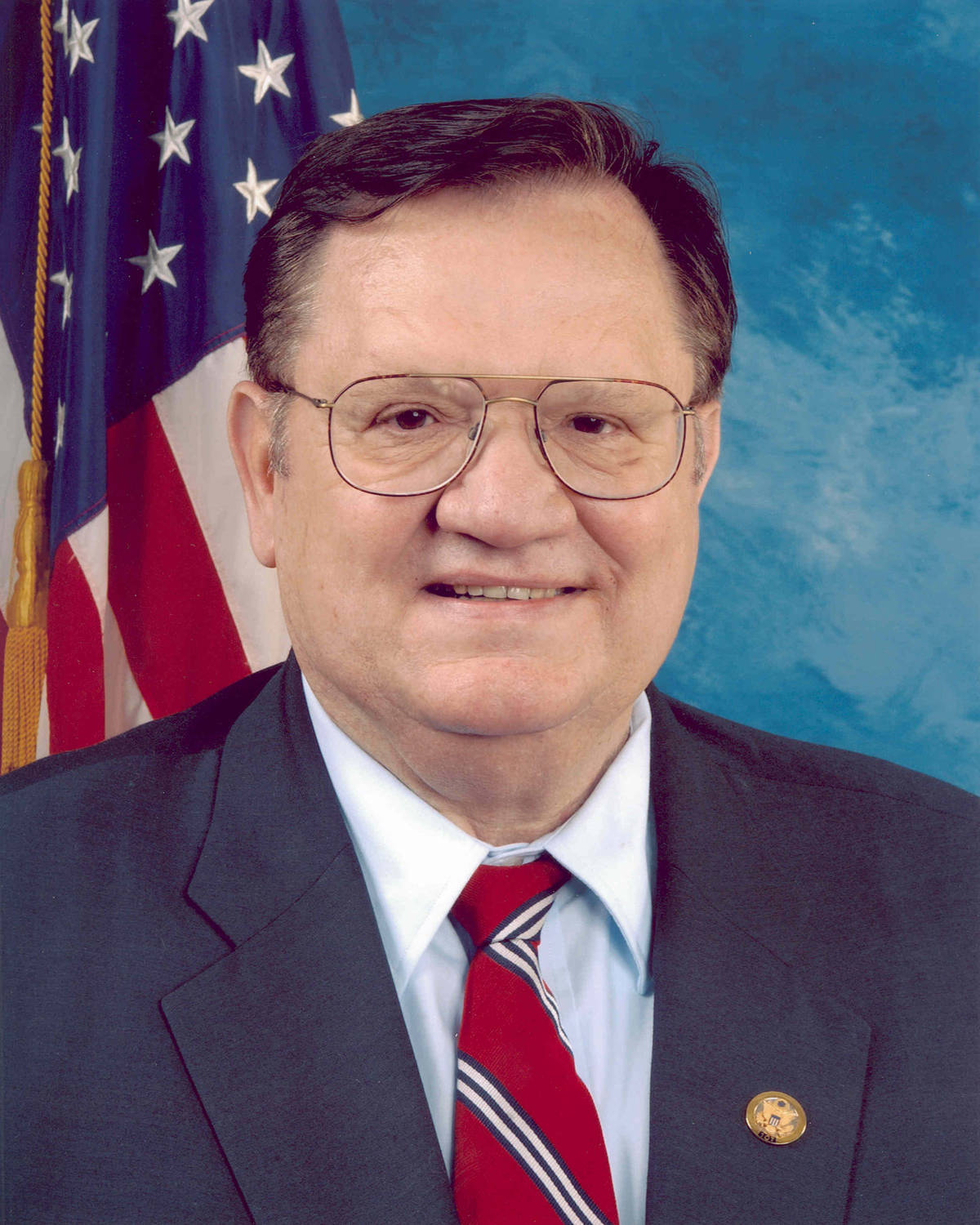

| Nominee | Paul Gillmor | Roger Anderson | John Green |
| Party | Republican | Democratic | Independent |
| Popular vote | 126,286 | 51,872 | 10,096 |
| Percentage | 67.1% | 27.6% | 5.4% |
- County results Gillmor: 50–60% 60–70% 70–80%
U.S. Representative before election
Paul Gillmor
Republican
Elected U.S. Representative
Paul Gillmor
Republican

=== Predictions ===
| Source | Ranking | As of |
|---|---|---|
| Sabato's Crystal Ball | Safe R | November 4, 2002 |
| New York Times | Safe R | October 14, 2002 |

=== General election results ===
Ohio's 5th Congressional District election, 2002
| Party | Candidate | Votes | % |
|---|---|---|---|
| Republican | Paul Gillmor (Incumbent) | 126,286 | 67.08 |
| Democratic | Roger Anderson | 51,872 | 27.55 |
| Independent | John Green | 10,096 | 5.36 |
| Total votes | | 188,254 | 100 |
| Republican hold | | | |

== District 6 ==
2002 Ohio's 6th congressional district election
- November 5, 2002
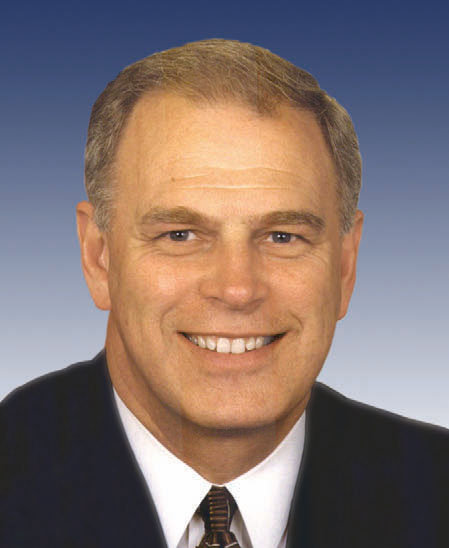

| Nominee | Ted Strickland | Mike Halleck |
| Party | Democratic | Republican |
| Popular vote | 113,972 | 77,643 |
| Percentage | 59.5% | 40.5% |
- Strickland: 50–60% 60–70% 70–80%
U.S. Representative before election
Ted Strickland
Democratic
Elected U.S. Representative
Ted Strickland
Democratic

=== Predictions ===
| Source | Ranking | As of |
|---|---|---|
| Sabato's Crystal Ball | Safe D | November 4, 2002 |
| New York Times | Safe D | October 14, 2002 |

=== General election results ===
Ohio's 6th Congressional District election, 2002
| Party | Candidate | Votes | % |
|---|---|---|---|
| Democratic | Ted Strickland (Incumbent) | 113,972 | 59.48 |
| Republican | Mike Halleck | 77,643 | 40.52 |
| Total votes | | 191,615 | 100 |
| Democratic hold | | | |

== District 7 ==
2002 Ohio's 7th congressional district election
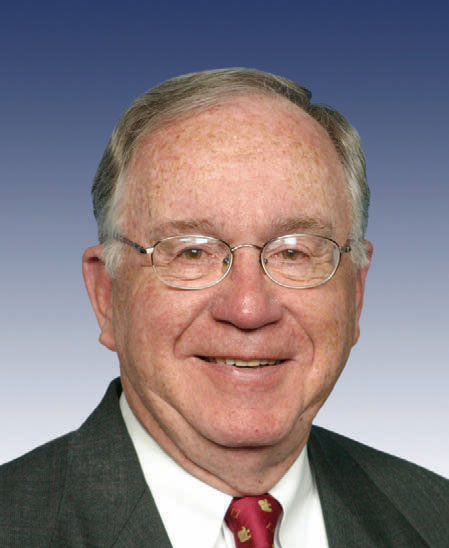

| Nominee | Dave Hobson | Kara Anastasio | Frank Doden |
| Party | Republican | Democratic | Independent |
| Popular vote | 113,252 | 45,568 | 8,812 |
| Percentage | 67.6% | 27.2% | 5.3% |
- County results Hobson: 50–60% 60–70% 70–80%
U.S. Representative before election
Dave Hobson
Republican
Elected U.S. Representative
Dave Hobson
Republican

=== Predictions ===
| Source | Ranking | As of |
|---|---|---|
| Sabato's Crystal Ball | Safe R | November 4, 2002 |
| New York Times | Safe R | October 14, 2002 |

=== General election results ===
Ohio's 7th Congressional District election, 2002
| Party | Candidate | Votes | % |
|---|---|---|---|
| Republican | Dave Hobson (Incumbent) | 113,252 | 67.56 |
| Democratic | Kara Anastasio | 45,568 | 27.18 |
| Independent | Frank Doden | 8,812 | 5.26 |
| Total votes | | 167,632 | 100 |
| Republican hold | | | |

== District 8 ==
2002 Ohio's 8th congressional district election
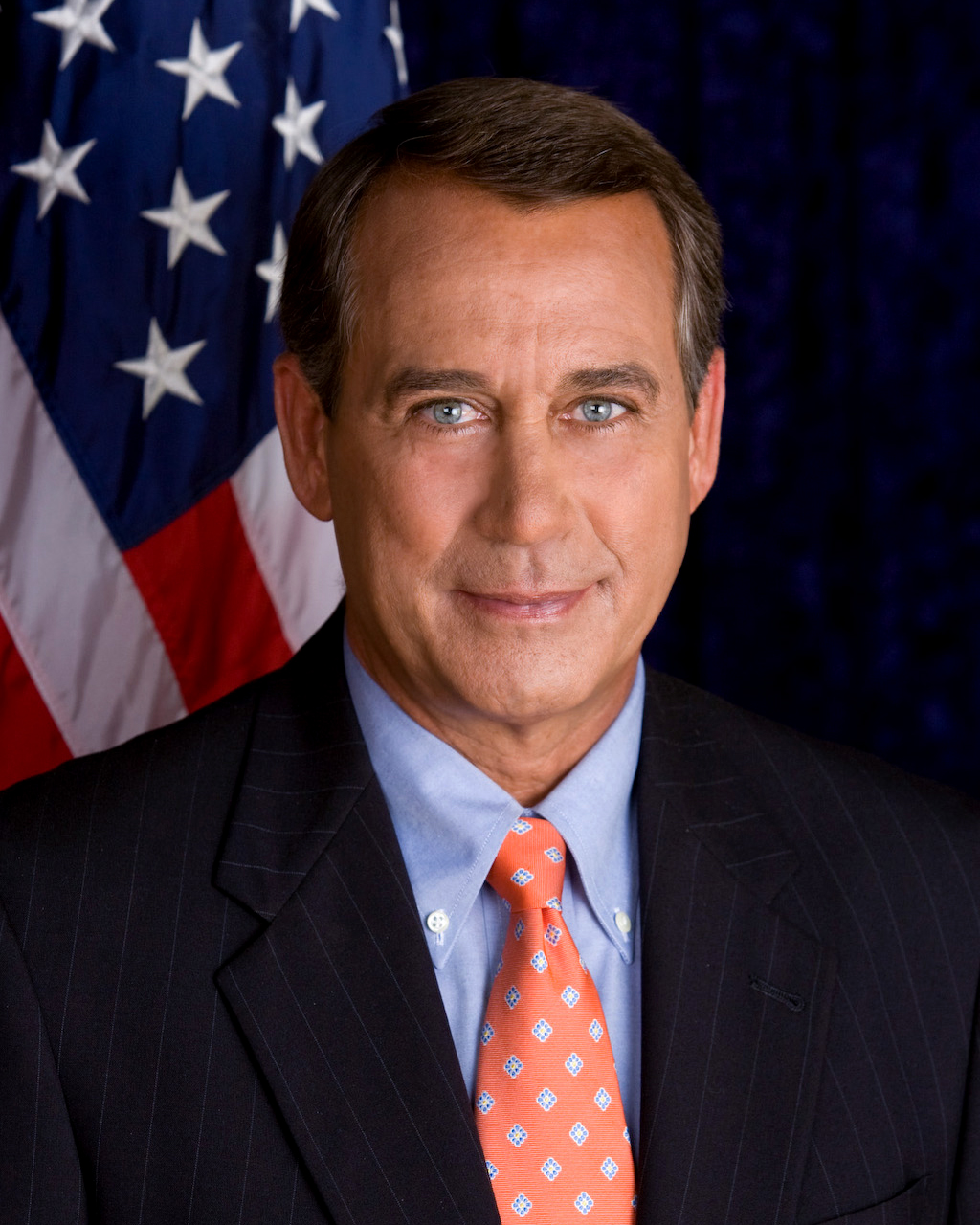

| Nominee | John Boehner | Jeff Hardenbrook |
| Party | Republican | Democratic |
| Popular vote | 119,947 | 49,444 |
| Percentage | 70.8% | 29.2% |
- County results Boehner: 50–60% 70–80%
U.S. Representative before election
John Boehner
Republican
Elected U.S. Representative
John Boehner
Republican

=== Predictions ===
| Source | Ranking | As of |
|---|---|---|
| Sabato's Crystal Ball | Safe R | November 4, 2002 |
| New York Times | Safe R | October 14, 2002 |

=== General election results ===
Ohio's 8th Congressional District election, 2002
| Party | Candidate | Votes | % |
|---|---|---|---|
| Republican | John Boehner (Incumbent) | 119,947 | 70.81 |
| Democratic | Jeff Hardenbrook | 49,444 | 29.19 |
| Total votes | | 169,391 | 100 |
| Republican hold | | | |

== District 9 ==
2002 Ohio's 9th congressional district election

| Nominee | Marcy Kaptur | Ed Emery |
| Party | Democratic | Republican |
| Popular vote | 132,236 | 46,481 |
| Percentage | 74.0% | 26.0% |
- County results Kaptur: 50–60% 60–70% 80–90%
U.S. Representative before election
Marcy Kaptur
Republican
Elected U.S. Representative
Marcy Kaptur
Democratic

=== Predictions ===
| Source | Ranking | As of |
|---|---|---|
| Sabato's Crystal Ball | Safe D | November 4, 2002 |
| New York Times | Safe D | October 14, 2002 |

=== General election results ===
Ohio's 9th Congressional District election, 2002
| Party | Candidate | Votes | % |
|---|---|---|---|
| Democratic | Marcy Kaptur (Incumbent) | 132,236 | 73.99 |
| Republican | Ed Emery | 46,481 | 26.01 |
| Total votes | | 178,717 | 100 |
| Democratic hold | | | |

== District 10 ==
2002 Ohio's 10th congressional district election
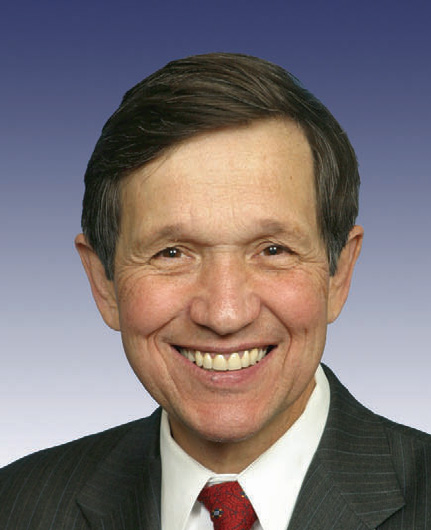

| Nominee | Dennis Kucinich | Jon Heben |
| Party | Democratic | Republican |
| Popular vote | 129,997 | 41,778 |
| Percentage | 74.1% | 23.8% |
U.S. Representative before election
Dennis Kucinich
Democratic
Elected U.S. Representative
Dennis Kucinich
Democratic

=== Predictions ===
| Source | Ranking | As of |
|---|---|---|
| Sabato's Crystal Ball | Safe D | November 4, 2002 |
| New York Times | Safe D | October 14, 2002 |

=== General election results ===
Ohio's 10th Congressional District election, 2002
| Party | Candidate | Votes | % |
|---|---|---|---|
| Democratic | Dennis Kucinich (Incumbent) | 129,997 | 74.06 |
| Republican | Jon Heben | 41,778 | 23.80 |
| Independent | Judy Locy | 3,761 | 2.14 |
| Total votes | | 175,536 | 100 |
| Democratic hold | | | |

== District 11 ==
2002 Ohio's 11th congressional district election
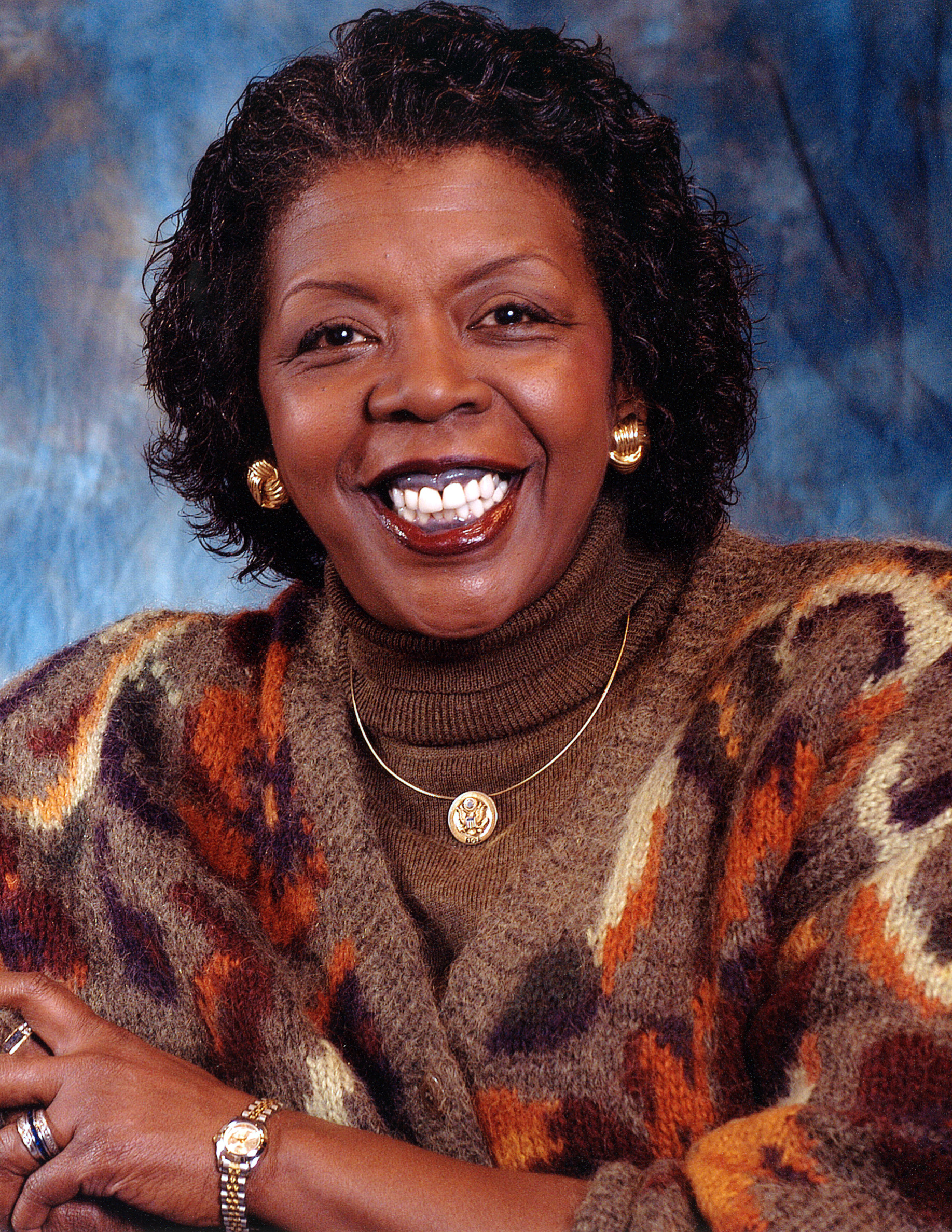

| Nominee | Stephanie Tubbs Jones | Patrick Pappano |
| Party | Democratic | Republican |
| Popular vote | 116,590 | 36,146 |
| Percentage | 76.3% | 23.7% |
U.S. Representative before election
Stephanie Tubbs Jones
Democratic
Elected U.S. Representative
Stephanie Tubbs Jones
Democratic

=== Predictions ===
| Source | Ranking | As of |
|---|---|---|
| Sabato's Crystal Ball | Safe D | November 4, 2002 |
| New York Times | Safe D | October 14, 2002 |

=== General election results ===
Ohio's 11th Congressional District election, 2002
| Party | Candidate | Votes | % |
|---|---|---|---|
| Democratic | Stephanie Tubbs Jones (Incumbent) | 116,590 | 76.33 |
| Republican | Patrick Pappano | 36,146 | 23.67 |
| Total votes | | 152,736 | 100 |
| Democratic hold | | | |

== District 12 ==
2002 Ohio's 12th congressional district election
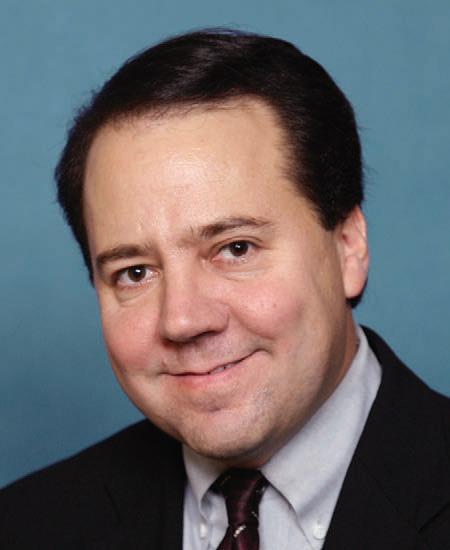

| Nominee | Pat Tiberi | Edward S. Brown |
| Party | Republican | Democratic |
| Popular vote | 116,982 | 64,707 |
| Percentage | 64.4% | 35.6% |
- County results Tiberi: 50–60% 70–80%
U.S. Representative before election
Pat Tiberi
Republican
Elected U.S. Representative
Pat Tiberi
Republican

=== Predictions ===
| Source | Ranking | As of |
|---|---|---|
| Sabato's Crystal Ball | Safe R | November 4, 2002 |
| New York Times | Safe R | October 14, 2002 |

=== General election results ===
Ohio's 12th Congressional District election, 2002
| Party | Candidate | Votes | % |
|---|---|---|---|
| Republican | Pat Tiberi (Incumbent) | 116,982 | 64.39 |
| Democratic | Edward S. Brown | 64,707 | 35.61 |
| Total votes | | 181,689 | 100 |
| Republican hold | | | |

== District 13 ==
2002 Ohio's 13th congressional district election
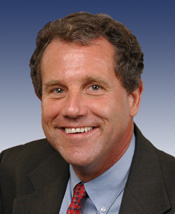

| Nominee | Sherrod Brown | Ed Oliveros |
| Party | Democratic | Republican |
| Popular vote | 123,025 | 55,357 |
| Percentage | 69.0% | 31.0% |
- County results Brown: 50–60% 60–70% 70–80%
U.S. Representative before election
Sherrod Brown
Democratic
Elected U.S. Representative
Sherrod Brown
Democratic

=== Predictions ===
| Source | Ranking | As of |
|---|---|---|
| Sabato's Crystal Ball | Safe D | November 4, 2002 |
| New York Times | Safe D | October 14, 2002 |

=== General election results ===
Ohio's 13th Congressional District election, 2002
| Party | Candidate | Votes | % |
|---|---|---|---|
| Democratic | Sherrod Brown (Incumbent) | 123,025 | 68.97 |
| Republican | Ed Oliveros | 55,357 | 31.03 |
| Total votes | | 178,382 | 100 |
| Democratic hold | | | |

== District 14 ==
2002 Ohio's 14th congressional district election
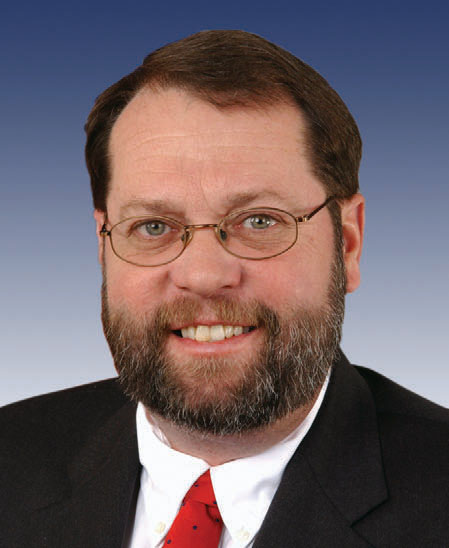

| Nominee | Steven LaTourette | Dale Virgil Blanchard |
| Party | Republican | Democratic |
| Popular vote | 134,413 | 51,846 |
| Percentage | 72.1% | 27.8% |
- County results Latourette: 50–60% 60–70% 70–80%
U.S. Representative before election
Steven LaTourette
Republican
Elected U.S. Representative
Steven LaTourette
Republican

=== Predictions ===
| Source | Ranking | As of |
|---|---|---|
| Sabato's Crystal Ball | Safe R | November 4, 2002 |
| New York Times | Safe R | October 14, 2002 |

=== General election results ===
Ohio's 14th Congressional District election, 2002
| Party | Candidate | Votes | % |
|---|---|---|---|
| Republican | Steven LaTourette (Incumbent) | 134,413 | 72.12 |
| Democratic | Dale Virgil Blanchard | 51,846 | 27.82 |
| Independent | Sid Stone (Write-in) | 113 | 0.06 |
| Total votes | | 186,372 | 100 |
| Republican hold | | | |

== District 15 ==
2002 Ohio's 15th congressional district election
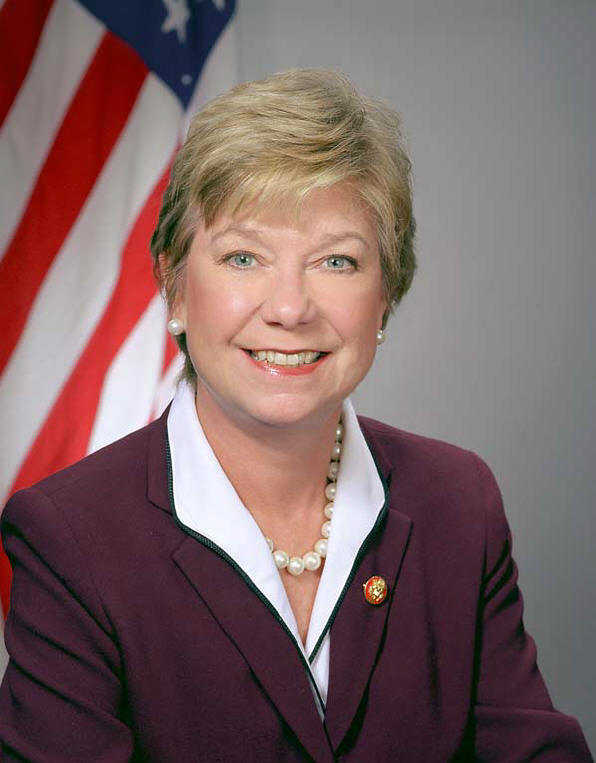

| Nominee | Deborah Pryce | Mark P. Brown |
| Party | Republican | Democratic |
| Popular vote | 108,193 | 109,673 |
| Percentage | 66.6% | 33.4% |
- County results Pryce: 60–70% 70–80%
U.S. Representative before election
Deborah Pryce
Republican
Elected U.S. Representative
Deborah Pryce
Republican

=== Predictions ===
| Source | Ranking | As of |
|---|---|---|
| Sabato's Crystal Ball | Safe R | November 4, 2002 |
| New York Times | Safe R | October 14, 2002 |

=== General election results ===
Ohio's 15th Congressional District election, 2002
| Party | Candidate | Votes | % |
|---|---|---|---|
| Republican | Deborah Pryce (Incumbent) | 108,193 | 66.59 |
| Democratic | Mark P. Brown | 54,286 | 33.41 |
| Total votes | | 162,479 | 100 |
| Republican hold | | | |

== District 16 ==
2002 Ohio's 16th congressional district election
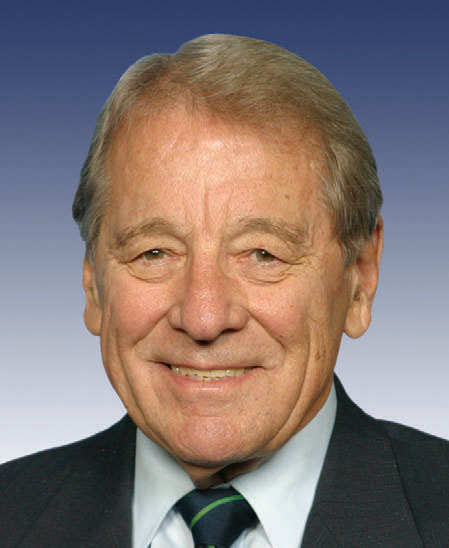

| Nominee | Ralph Regula | Jim Rice |
| Party | Republican | Democratic |
| Popular vote | 129,734 | 58,644 |
| Percentage | 68.9% | 31.1% |
- County results Regula: 60–70% 70–80%
U.S. Representative before election
Ralph Regula
Republican
Elected U.S. Representative
Ralph Regula
Republican

=== Predictions ===
| Source | Ranking | As of |
|---|---|---|
| Sabato's Crystal Ball | Safe R | November 4, 2002 |
| New York Times | Safe R | October 14, 2002 |

=== General election results ===
Ohio's 16th Congressional District election, 2002
| Party | Candidate | Votes | % |
|---|---|---|---|
| Republican | Ralph Regula (Incumbent) | 129,734 | 68.87 |
| Democratic | Jim Rice | 58,644 | 31.13 |
| Total votes | | 188,378 | 100 |
| Republican hold | | | |

== District 17 ==
2002 Ohio's 17th congressional district election
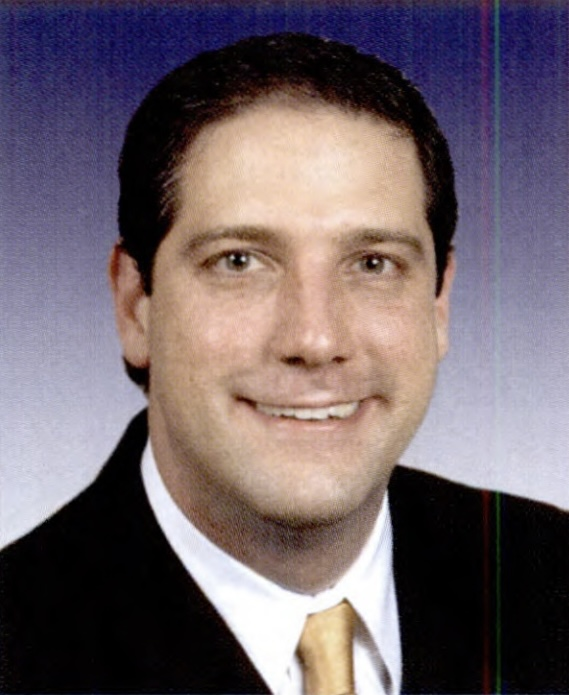

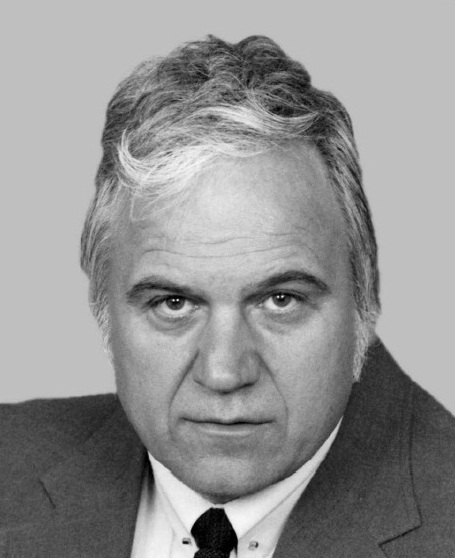
| Nominee | Tim Ryan | Ann Womer Benjamin | James Traficant |
| Party | Democratic | Republican | Independent |
| Popular vote | 94,441 | 62,188 | 41,925 |
| Percentage | 51.1% | 33.7% | 19.75% |
- County results Ryan: 50–60% Womer Benjamin: 40–50%
U.S. Representative before election
James Traficant
Democratic
Elected U.S. Representative
Tim Ryan
Democratic

=== Predictions ===
| Source | Ranking | As of |
|---|---|---|
| Sabato's Crystal Ball | Lean D | November 4, 2002 |
| New York Times | Safe D | October 14, 2002 |

=== General election results ===
Ohio's 17th Congressional District election, 2002
| Party | Candidate | Votes | % |
|---|---|---|---|
| Democratic | Tim Ryan | 94,441 | 51.14 |
| Republican | Ann Womer Benjamin | 62,188 | 33.67 |
| Independent | James Traficant | 28,045 | 15.19 |
| Total votes | | 184,674 | 100 |
| Democratic hold | | | |

== District 18 ==
2002 Ohio's 18th congressional district election
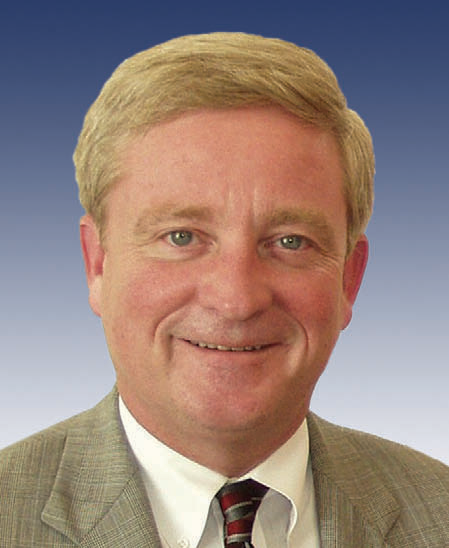
| Nominee | Bob Ney |
| Party | Republican |
| Popular vote | 125,546 |
| Percentage | 100.0% |
U.S. Representative before election
Bob Ney
Republican
Elected U.S. Representative
Bob Ney
Republican

=== Predictions ===
| Source | Ranking | As of |
|---|---|---|
| Sabato's Crystal Ball | Safe R | November 4, 2002 |
| New York Times | Safe R | October 14, 2002 |

=== General election results ===
Ohio's 18th Congressional District election, 2002
| Party | Candidate | Votes | % |
|---|---|---|---|
| Republican | Bob Ney (Incumbent) | 125,546 | 100 |
| Republican hold | | | |
