= Ohio's 15th congressional district =

U.S. House district for Ohio

Coordinates: 39°34′40″N 82°45′22″W

- Interactive map of district boundaries
- Representative: Mike Carey; R–Columbus
- Distribution: 60% rural; 40% urban
- Population (2025): 805,617
- Median household income: $81,466
- Ethnicity: 73.2% White; 11.0% Black; 6.2% Hispanic; 4.9% Two or more races; 4.1% Asian; 0.7% other
- Cook PVI: R+4

The 15th congressional district of Ohio is currently represented by Republican Mike Carey. It was represented by Republican Steve Stivers from 2011 until May 16, 2021, when he resigned to become president and CEO of the Ohio Chamber of Commerce. The district includes all of Franklin County not in the 3rd district. The district includes Grove City, Hilliard, and Dublin, as well as southern and western portions of the state capital Columbus. It then fans out to grab suburban and exurban territory between Columbus and Dayton, along with more rural territory south of Columbus.

== Recent election results from statewide races ==
=== 2023–2027 boundaries ===
Year	Office	Results
2008	President	McCain 52% – 46%
2012	President	Romney 52% – 48%
2016	President	Trump 53% – 42%
2016	Senate	Portman 61% – 35%
2018	Senate	Brown 53% – 47%
2018	Governor	DeWine 51% – 47%
2018	Secretary of State	LaRose 52% – 46%
2018	Treasurer	Sprague 55% – 45%
2018	Auditor	Faber 50% – 46%
2018	Attorney General	Yost 55% – 45%
2020	President	Trump 53% – 46%
2022	Senate	Vance 53% – 47%
2022	Governor	DeWine 62% – 38%
2022	Secretary of State	LaRose 59% – 40%
2022	Treasurer	Sprague 58% – 42%
2022	Auditor	Faber 59% – 41%
2022	Attorney General	Yost 60% – 40%
2024	President	Trump 54% – 45%
2024	Senate	Moreno 49% – 47%

=== 2027–2033 boundaries ===
Year	Office	Results
2008	President	McCain 52% – 47%
2012	President	Romney 51% – 49%
2016	President	Trump 53% – 42%
2016	Senate	Portman 60% – 34%
2018	Senate	Brown 53% – 47%
2018	Governor	DeWine 50% – 47%
2018	Attorney General	Yost 54% – 46%
2020	President	Trump 53% – 46%
2022	Senate	Vance 52% – 48%
2022	Governor	DeWine 61% – 39%
2022	Secretary of State	LaRose 59% – 40%
2022	Treasurer	Sprague 58% – 42%
2022	Auditor	Faber 58% – 42%
2022	Attorney General	Yost 60% – 40%
2024	President	Trump 55% – 45%
2024	Senate	Moreno 49% – 47%

== Composition ==
For the 118th and successive Congresses (based on redistricting following the 2020 census), the district contains all or portions of the following counties, townships, and municipalities:

Clark County (15)

Bethel Township, Catawba, Donnelsville, German Township, Harmony Township, Madison Township, Mad River Township (part; also 10th), Moorefield Township, New Carlisle, North Hampton, Pike Township, Pleasant Township, South Charleston, South Vienna, Tremont City

Fayette County (14)

Bloomingburg, Concord Township, Jasper Township, Jefferson Township, Jeffersonville, Madison Township, Marion Township, Milledgeville, New Holland, Octa, Paint Township, Union Township, Washington Court House, Wayne Township

Franklin County (22)

Brice, Brown Township, Canal Winchester (shared with Fairfield County), Columbus (part; also 3rd, 4th, and 12th; shared with Delaware and Fairfield counties), Dublin, Grove City, Groveport, Hamilton Township, Harrisburg, Hilliard, Jackson Township, Lithopolis, Lockbourne, Madison Township, Norwich Township, Obetz, Pickerington (shared with Fairfield County), Pleasant Township, Prairie Township, Urbancrest, Valleyview, Washington Township

Madison County (20)

All 20 townships and municipalities

Miami County (18)

Bethel Township, Bradford, Brown Township, Casstown, Concord Township (part; also 8th), Covington, Elizabeth Township, Fletcher, Huber Heights (part; also 10th; shared with Montgomery County), Lostcreek Township, Monroe Township, Newberry Township, Piqua, Springcreek Township, Staunton Township, Tipp City, Troy, Washington Township

Shelby County (11)

Clinton Township, Cynthian Township, Green Township, Lockington, Loramie Township, Orange Township, Perry Township, Russia, Sidney, Turtle Creek Township (part; also 4th), Washington Township

== List of members representing the district ==
Member	Party	Year(s)	Cong ress	Electoral history	Counties represented
District established March 4, 1833
Jonathan Sloane (Ravenna)	Anti-Masonic	March 4, 1833 – March 3, 1837	23rd 24th	Elected in 1832. Re-elected in 1834. Retired.	
John William Allen (Cleveland)	Whig	March 4, 1837 – March 3, 1841	25th 26th	Elected in 1836. Re-elected in 1838. Retired.	
Sherlock J. Andrews (Cleveland)	Whig	March 4, 1841 – March 3, 1843	27th	Elected in 1840. Retired.	
Joseph Morris (Woodsfield)	Democratic	March 4, 1843 – March 3, 1847	28th 29th	Elected in 1843. Re-elected in 1844. Retired.	
William Kennon Jr. (St. Clairsville)	Democratic	March 4, 1847 – March 3, 1849	30th	Elected in 1846. Lost re-election.	
William F. Hunter (Woodsfield)	Whig	March 4, 1849 – March 3, 1853	31st 32nd	Elected in 1848. Re-elected in 1850. Retired.	
William R. Sapp (Mount Vernon)	Whig	March 4, 1853 – March 3, 1855	33rd 34th	Elected in 1852. Re-elected in 1854. Lost re-election.	
William R. Sapp (Mount Vernon)	Anti-Nebraska	March 4, 1855 – March 3, 1857	33rd 34th	Elected in 1852. Re-elected in 1854. Lost re-election.	
Joseph Burns (Coshocton)	Democratic	March 4, 1857 – March 3, 1859	35th	Elected in 1856. Lost re-election.	
William Helmick (New Philadelphia)	Republican	March 4, 1859 – March 3, 1861	36th	Elected in 1858. Lost re-election.	
Robert H. Nugen (Newcomerstown)	Democratic	March 4, 1861 – March 3, 1863	37th	Elected in 1860. Retired.	
James R. Morris (Woodsfield)	Democratic	March 4, 1863 – March 3, 1865	38th	Redistricted from the 17th district and re-elected in 1862. Lost re-election.	
Tobias A. Plants (Pomeroy)	Republican	March 4, 1865 – March 3, 1869	39th 40th	Elected in 1864. Re-elected in 1866. Retired.	
Eliakim H. Moore (Athens)	Republican	March 4, 1869 – March 3, 1871	41st	Elected in 1868. Retired.	
William P. Sprague (McConnellsville)	Republican	March 4, 1871 – March 3, 1875	42nd 43rd	Elected in 1870. Re-elected in 1872. Retired.	
Nelson H. Van Vorhes (Athens)	Republican	March 4, 1875 – March 3, 1879	44th 45th	Elected in 1874. Re-elected in 1876. Retired.	
George W. Geddes (Mansfield)	Democratic	March 4, 1879 – March 3, 1881	46th	Elected in 1878. Redistricted to the 14th district.	
Rufus Dawes (Marietta)	Republican	March 4, 1881 – March 3, 1883	47th	Elected in 1880. Lost re-election.	
Adoniram J. Warner (Marietta)	Democratic	March 4, 1883 – March 3, 1885	48th	Elected in 1882. Redistricted to the 17th district.	
Beriah Wilkins (Uhrichsville)	Democratic	March 4, 1885 – March 3, 1887	49th	Redistricted from the 16th district and re-elected in 1884. Redistricted to the 16th district.	
Charles H. Grosvenor (Athens)	Republican	March 4, 1887 – March 3, 1891	50th 51st	Redistricted from the 14th district and re-elected in 1886. Re-elected in 1888. Retired.	
Michael D. Harter (Mansfield)	Democratic	March 4, 1891 – March 3, 1893	52nd	Elected in 1890. Redistricted to the 14th district.	
H. Clay Van Voorhis (Zanesville)	Republican	March 4, 1893 – March 3, 1905	53rd 54th 55th 56th 57th 58th	Elected in 1892. Re-elected in 1894. Re-elected in 1896. Re-elected in 1898. Re-elected in 1900. Re-elected in 1902. Retired.	
Beman G. Dawes (Marietta)	Republican	March 4, 1905 – March 3, 1909	59th 60th	Elected in 1904. Re-elected in 1906. Retired.	
James Joyce (Cambridge)	Republican	March 4, 1909 – March 3, 1911	61st	Elected in 1908. Lost re-election.	
George White (Marietta)	Democratic	March 4, 1911 – March 3, 1915	62nd 63rd	Elected in 1910. Re-elected in 1912. Lost re-election.	
William C. Mooney (Woodsfield)	Republican	March 4, 1915 – March 3, 1917	64th	Elected in 1914. Lost re-election.	
George White (Marietta)	Democratic	March 4, 1917 – March 3, 1919	65th	Elected in 1916. Lost re-election.	
C. Ellis Moore (Cambridge)	Republican	March 4, 1919 – March 3, 1933	66th 67th 68th 69th 70th 71st 72nd	Elected in 1918. Re-elected in 1920. Re-elected in 1922. Re-elected in 1924. Re-elected in 1926. Re-elected in 1928. Re-elected in 1930. Lost re-election.	
Robert T. Secrest (Caldwell)	Democratic	March 4, 1933 – August 3, 1942	73rd 74th 75th 76th 77th	Elected in 1932. Re-elected in 1934. Re-elected in 1936. Re-elected in 1938. Re-elected in 1940. Resigned to enter the U.S. Navy.	
Vacant		August 3, 1942 – January 3, 1943	77th		
Percy W. Griffiths (Marietta)	Republican	January 3, 1943 – January 3, 1949	78th 79th 80th	Elected in 1942. Re-elected in 1944. Re-elected in 1946. Lost re-election.	
Robert T. Secrest (Senecaville)	Democratic	January 3, 1949 – September 26, 1954	81st 82nd 83rd	Elected in 1948. Re-elected in 1950. Re-elected in 1952. Resigned to become a member of the Federal Trade Commission.	
Vacant		September 26, 1954 – January 3, 1955	83rd		
John E. Henderson (Cambridge)	Republican	January 3, 1955 – January 3, 1961	84th 85th 86th	Elected in 1954. Re-elected in 1956. Re-elected in 1958. Retired.	
Tom V. Moorehead (Zanesville)	Republican	January 3, 1961 – January 3, 1963	87th	Elected in 1960. Lost re-election.	
Robert T. Secrest (Senecaville)	Democratic	January 3, 1963 – December 30, 1966	88th 89th	Elected in 1962. Re-elected in 1964. Resigned.	
Vacant		December 30, 1966 – January 3, 1967	89th		
Chalmers P. Wylie (Columbus)	Republican	January 3, 1967 – January 3, 1993	90th 91st 92nd 93rd 94th 95th 96th 97th 98th 99th 100th 101st 102nd	Elected in 1966. Re-elected in 1968. Re-elected in 1970. Re-elected in 1972. Re-elected in 1974. Re-elected in 1976. Re-elected in 1978. Re-elected in 1980. Re-elected in 1982. Re-elected in 1984. Re-elected in 1986. Re-elected in 1988. Re-elected in 1990. Retired.	
Deborah Pryce (Columbus)	Republican	January 3, 1993 – January 3, 2009	103rd 104th 105th 106th 107th 108th 109th 110th	Elected in 1992. Re-elected in 1994. Re-elected in 1996. Re-elected in 1998. Re-elected in 2000. Re-elected in 2002. Re-elected in 2004. Re-elected in 2006. Retired.	
Deborah Pryce (Columbus)	Republican	January 3, 1993 – January 3, 2009	103rd 104th 105th 106th 107th 108th 109th 110th	Elected in 1992. Re-elected in 1994. Re-elected in 1996. Re-elected in 1998. Re-elected in 2000. Re-elected in 2002. Re-elected in 2004. Re-elected in 2006. Retired.	2003–2013
Mary Jo Kilroy (Columbus)	Democratic	January 3, 2009 – January 3, 2011	111th	Elected in 2008. Lost re-election.	2003–2013
Steve Stivers (Columbus)	Republican	January 3, 2011 – May 16, 2021	112th 113th 114th 115th 116th 117th	Elected in 2010. Re-elected in 2012. Re-elected in 2014. Re-elected in 2016. Re-elected in 2018. Re-elected in 2020. Resigned to become CEO of the Ohio Chamber of Commerce.	2003–2013
Steve Stivers (Columbus)	Republican	January 3, 2011 – May 16, 2021	112th 113th 114th 115th 116th 117th	Elected in 2010. Re-elected in 2012. Re-elected in 2014. Re-elected in 2016. Re-elected in 2018. Re-elected in 2020. Resigned to become CEO of the Ohio Chamber of Commerce.	2013–2023
Vacant		May 16, 2021 – November 4, 2021	117th		2013–2023
Mike Carey (Columbus)	Republican	November 4, 2021 – present	117th 118th 119th	Elected to finish Stivers's term. Re-elected in 2022. Re-elected in 2024. Lost re-election.	2013–2023
Mike Carey (Columbus)	Republican	November 4, 2021 – present	117th 118th 119th	Elected to finish Stivers's term. Re-elected in 2022. Re-elected in 2024. Lost re-election.	2023–2027
Don Leonard (Columbus)	Democratic	Assuming office on January 3, 2027		Elected in 2026.	2023–2027

== Election results ==
The following chart shows historic election results. Bold type indicates victor. Italic type indicates incumbent.

Year	Democratic	Republican	Other
2024	Adam Miller: 148,045	**Mike Carey**: 192,477	
2022	Gary Josephson: 108,139	**Mike Carey**: 143,112	
2021 (special)	Allison Russo: 66,757	**Mike Carey**: 93,255	
2020	Joel Newby: 140,183	**Steve Stivers**: 243,103	
2018	Rick Neal: 116,112	**Steve Stivers**: 170,593	Johnathan Miller (L): 5,738
2016	Scott Wharton: 113,960	**Steve Stivers**: 222,847	
2014	Scott Wharton: 66,125	**Steve Stivers**: 128,496	
2012	Pat Lang: 128,188	**Steve Stivers**: 205,277	
2010	Mary Jo Kilroy: 86,815	Steve Stivers: 116,290	William Kammerer (L): 5,831; David Ryon (Constitution): 3,728; Bill Buckel (Write-In): 240
2008	Mary Jo Kilroy: 139,584	Steve Stivers: 137,272	Mark M. Noble (L): 14,061; Don Eckhart: 12,915; Travis Casper: 6
2006	Mary Jo Kilroy: 109,677	**Deborah D. Pryce**: 110,739	
2004	Mark P. Brown: 117,324	**Deborah D. Pryce**: 189,024	
2002	Mark P. Brown: 54,286	**Deborah D. Pryce**: 108,193	
2000	William L. Buckel: 64,805	**Deborah D. Pryce**: 156,792	Scott T. Smith (L): 10,700
1998	Adam Clay Miller: 49,334	**Deborah D. Pryce**: 113,846	Kevin Nestor: 9,996
1996	Cliff Arnebeck Jr.: 64,665	**Deborah D. Pryce**: 156,776	
1994	William L. Buckel: 46,480	**Deborah D. Pryce**: 112,912	
1992	Richard Cordray: 94,907	Deborah D. Pryce: 110,390	Linda Reidelbach: 44,906
1990	Thomas V. Erney: 68,510	**Chalmers P. Wylie**: 99,251	William L. Buckel (WI): 158
1988	Mark S. Froehlich: 51,172	**Chalmers P. Wylie**: 154,694	
1986	David L. Jackson: 55,750	**Chalmers P. Wylie**: 97,745	
1984	Duane Jager: 58,870	**Chalmers P. Wylie**: 148,311	
1982	Greg Kostelac: 47,070	**Chalmers P. Wylie**: 104,678	Steve Kender (L): 6,139
1980	Terry Freeman: 48,708	**Chalmers P. Wylie**: 129,025	
1978	Henry W. Eckhart: 37,000	**Chalmers P. Wylie**: 91,023	
1976	Manley L. "Mike" McGee: 57,741	**Chalmers P. Wylie**: 109,630	
1974	Manley L. "Mike" McGee: 49,683	**Chalmers P. Wylie**: 79,376	
1972	Manley L. "Mike" McGee: 55,314	**Chalmers P. Wylie**: 115,779	Edward Price (AI): 4,820
1970	Manley L. "Mike" McGee: 34,018	**Chalmers P. Wylie**: 81,536	
1968	Russell H. Volkema: 35,861	**Chalmers P. Wylie**: 98,499	
1966	Robert L. Van Heyde: 38,805	Chalmers P. Wylie: 57,993	
1964	**Robert T. Secrest**: 62,438	Randall Metcalf: 31,803	
1962	Robert T. Secrest: 41,856	Tom Van Horn Moorehead: 38,095	
1960	Herbert U. Smith: 47,366	Tom Van Horn Moorehead: 49,742	
1958	Herbert U. Smith: 36,026	**John E. Henderson**: 48,316	
1956	Herbert U. Smith: 35,954	**John E. Henderson**: 55,126	
1954	Max L. Underwood: 32,795	John E. Henderson: 38,524	
1952	**Robert T. Secrest**: 62,913	Percy W. Griffiths: 34,966	
1950	**Robert T. Secrest**: 47,448	Holland M. Gary: 29,573	
1948	Robert T. Secrest: 45,575	Percy W. Griffiths: 35,294	
1946	Robert T. Secrest: 32,159	**Percy W. Griffiths**: 36,564	
1944	Olney R. Gillogly: 31,756	**Percy W. Griffiths**: 47,710	
1942	Charles W. Lynch: 23,213	Percy W. Griffiths: 35,137	
1940	**Robert T. Secrest**: 57,359	Clair A. Young: 40,233	
1938	**Robert T. Secrest**: 42,573	Percy W. Griffiths: 38,903	
1936	**Robert T. Secrest**: 53,263	Kenneth C. Ray: 42,053	Joe I. Clarke: 333
1934	**Robert T. Secrest**: 42,722	Kenneth C. Ray: 33,950	
1932	Robert T. Secrest: 50,313	C. Ellis Moore: 38,113	Joseph H. Ewing: 444
1930	H. R. McClintock: 33,968	**C. Ellis Moore**: 35,611	
1928	Frank H. Ward: 26,441	**C. Ellis Moore**: 50,941	
1926	E. B. Schneider: 23,703	**C. Ellis Moore**: 28,519	
1924	James R. Alexander: 30,608	**C. Ellis Moore**: 39,155	
1922	James R. Alexander: 30,120	**C. Ellis Moore**: 32,894	F. J. Ash: 1,003
1920	John S. Talbott: 30,326	**C. Ellis Moore**: 42,419	

=== 2012 ===
Ohio's 15th congressional district, 2012
Party	Candidate	Votes	%
**Republican**	**Steve Stivers (incumbent)**	**205,274**	**61.6**
Democratic	Pat Lang	128,188	38.4
Total votes		**333,462**	**100.0**
Republican **hold**			

=== 2014 ===
Ohio's 15th congressional district, 2014
Party	Candidate	Votes	%
**Republican**	**Steve Stivers (incumbent)**	**128,496**	**66.0**
Democratic	Scott Wharton	66,125	34.0
Total votes		**194,621**	**100.0**
Republican **hold**			

=== 2016 ===
Ohio's 15th congressional district, 2016
Party	Candidate	Votes	%
**Republican**	**Steve Stivers (incumbent)**	**222,847**	**66.2**
Democratic	Scott Wharton	113,960	33.8
Total votes		**336,807**	**100.0**
Republican **hold**			

=== 2018 ===
Ohio's 15th congressional district, 2018
Party	Candidate	Votes	%
**Republican**	**Steve Stivers (incumbent)**	**170,593**	**58.3**
Democratic	Rick Neal	116,112	39.7
Libertarian	Jonathan Miller	5,738	2.0
Total votes		**292,443**	**100.0**
Republican **hold**			

=== 2020 ===
Ohio's 15th congressional district election, 2020
Party	Candidate	Votes	%
**Republican**	**Steve Stivers (incumbent)**	**243,103**	**63.4**
Democratic	Joel Newby	140,183	36.6
Write-in		75	0.0
Total votes		**383,361**	**100.0**
Republican **hold**			

=== 2021 (Special) ===
2021 Ohio's 15th congressional district special election
Party	Candidate	Votes	%	±%
**Republican**	**Mike Carey**	**94,501**	**58.30%**	**–5.11**
Democratic	Allison Russo	67,588	41.70%	+5.13
Total votes		**162,089**	**100.0%**	
Turnout		165,026 (Note: Including invalid votes or ballots not counted for either candidate)	32.25%	
Registered electors		511,773		
Republican **hold**				

=== 2022 ===
Ohio's 15th congressional district, 2022
Party	Candidate	Votes	%
**Republican**	**Mike Carey (incumbent)**	**143,112**	**57.0**
Democratic	Gary Josephson	108,139	43.0
Total votes		**251,251**	**100.0**
Republican **hold**			

=== 2024 ===
2024 Ohio's 15th congressional district election
Party	Candidate	Votes	%
**Republican**	**Mike Carey (incumbent)**	**196,338**	**56.46**
Democratic	Adam Miller	151,411	43.54
Total votes		**347,749**	**100.0**
Republican **hold**			

== In popular culture ==
The character Deanna Monroe, from AMC's The Walking Dead was a former congresswoman from Ohio's 15th congressional district.

== See also ==
- Ohio's congressional districts
- List of United States congressional districts
- Gerrymandering
