= Chalmers Wylie =

American politician

Chalmers P. Wylie
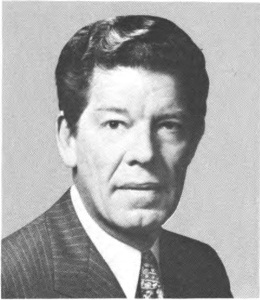

Member of the U.S. House of Representatives from Ohio's 15th district
- In office January 3, 1967 – January 3, 1993
- Preceded by: Robert T. Secrest
- Succeeded by: Deborah D. Pryce

Member of the Ohio House of Representatives from the 25th district
- In office January 3, 1961 – January 1, 1967
- Preceded by: Tom V. Moorehead
- Succeeded by: Sam Speck

Columbus City Attorney
- In office 1953–1956

Assistant Attorney General of Ohio
- In office 1951–1954

Personal details
- Born: Chalmers Pangburn Wylie; November 23, 1920 Norwich, Ohio, U.S.
- Died: August 14, 1998 (aged 77) Columbus, Ohio, U.S.
- Party: Republican

Chalmers Pangburn Wylie (November 23, 1920 – August 14, 1998) was an American politician and lawyer from Ohio, who served in various public offices in that state before serving thirteen terms as a member of the United States House of Representatives from 1967 to 1993.

== Biography ==
Wylie was born in Norwich, Ohio, and grew up in Pataskala, a small community east of Columbus. He attended Otterbein College in Westerville and Ohio State University in Columbus. He earned his Juris Doctor at Harvard Law School in 1948.

Wylie enlisted in the United States Army as a private, and eventually attaining the rank of first lieutenant while serving with the 30th Infantry Division in Europe during World War II. He remained in the U.S. Army Reserve after the war, attaining the rank of lieutenant colonel.

He was:

- assistant attorney general of Ohio from 1951 to 1954
- assistant city attorney of Columbus, Ohio, from 1949 to 1950
- elected city attorney of Columbus, Ohio, from 1953 to 1956
- administrator of the Bureau of Workman's Compensation for the State of Ohio in 1957
- appointed first assistant to the Governor of Ohio in 1957
- elected president of Ohio Municipal League
- elected to three terms in the State Legislature of Ohio, 1961–1967
- elected as a Republican for 13 terms to the United States Congress (January 3, 1967 – January 3, 1993)

In addition to his public service, Wylie worked in private practice as an attorney from 1957 until 1968, which he resumed in Columbus after leaving Congress until his death there. He is buried at Saint Joseph Cemetery in Lockbourne, Ohio.

The Chalmers P. Wylie VA Ambulatory Care Center in Columbus is named in his honor.

== Opposition to Playboy's Braille edition ==
In 1981, Republican Senator Mack Mattingly had unsuccessfully attempted to remove sections of Playboy Magazine's braille edition, which was produced using federal funds through the Library of Congress. During appropriations discussions in July 1985, Wylie successfully passed a motion in the House to reduce the budget of the Library of Congress by $103,000, which was the exact amount it cost to produce the braille edition of Playboy, subsequently leading to the discontinuation of the magazine. This would be later reversed by a 1986 ruling in federal district court from Judge Thomas Hogan, who ruled that Congress' actions were a violation of the First Amendment. Production of the Playboy braille edition resumed in January 1987.

U.S. House of Representatives
Preceded by Robert T. Secrest	Member of the U.S. House of Representatives from Ohio's 15th congressional district January 3, 1967 – January 3, 1993	Succeeded by Deborah D. Pryce
Preceded by J. William Stanton	Ranking Member of the House Banking, Finance and Urban Affairs Committee; 1983–1993	Succeeded by Jim Leach
