= Mary Jo Kilroy =

American politician (born 1949)

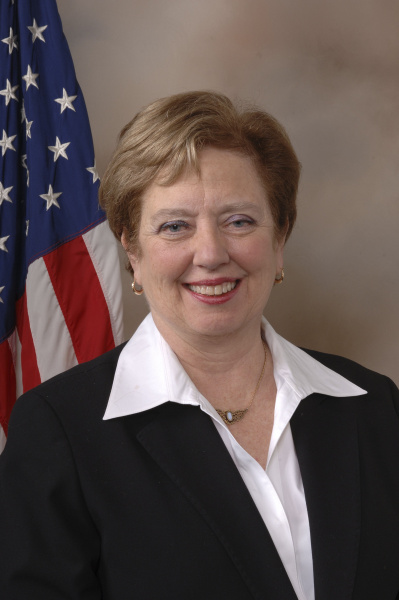

Member of the U.S. House of Representatives from Ohio's 15th district
- In office January 3, 2009 – January 3, 2011
- Preceded by: Deborah Pryce
- Succeeded by: Steve Stivers

Member of the Franklin County Board of Commissioners
- In office January 3, 2001 – January 3, 2009; President: 2005–2007
- Preceded by: Dorothy Teater
- Succeeded by: John O'Grady

Personal details
- Born: April 30, 1949 (age 77) Euclid, Ohio, U.S.
- Party: Democratic
- Spouse: Robert Handelman
- Education: Cleveland State University (BA); Ohio State University (JD)

Mary Jo Kilroy (born April 30, 1949) is an American attorney and politician who served as the U.S. representative for Ohio's 15th congressional district from 2009 until 2011. She is a member of the Democratic Party from Ohio. She was defeated in her November 2, 2010 re-election bid. In 2012, she ran in the newly redrawn, Columbus-based 3rd congressional district but lost in the primary.

She is an attorney and a former two-term County Commissioner of Franklin County, Ohio, which includes the capital city of Columbus and some of its surrounding suburban and rural areas. Previously, she served two four-year terms on the Columbus School Board after working in private practice.

In both the 2006 and 2008 United States House of Representatives elections, Kilroy was involved in close elections for Ohio's 15th congressional district. She lost in 2006 after an election that required the counting of absentee ballots and election recounts. However, after the incumbent retired, she won a similarly close election in 2008. In both cases, she was behind after the Election Day vote tabulations, but made up significant ground with belated absentee ballot voting results. The 2010 election race was widely followed in the mainstream press as a race that the Republicans were targeting.

== Early life, education, and legal career ==
Born in Euclid, Ohio, Kilroy grew up in Cleveland. The daughter of a pipe fitter, she paid her way through college by working at hospitals, as a waitress and as a counselor. She earned her bachelor's degree in political science from Cleveland State University in 1977 and her J.D. from Ohio State University in 1980.

Prior to practicing law as a partner with her husband at the plaintiffs law firm of Handelman and Kilroy, Kilroy was a social worker, hospital technician and tutor. In 1988, as chairman of her local branch of the National Lawyers Guild, Kilroy signed a letter urging Columbus Mayor Dana G. Rinehart to support an order in favor of creating an equal employment opportunity chief to handle race relations issues in the Columbus Division of Police.

== Local politics ==
In 1991, she ran for an eighteen-person contest for four Columbus School Board seats on a platform that included proposing to lengthen the scholastic day from six and a half hours to eight. Kilroy was one of four candidates to receive the endorsement of the Franklin County Democratic Party. On November 5, 1991, she placed behind incumbent Columbus School Board President, Sharlene Morgan, natural resources expert Robert Teater, past board member Bill Moss, which made her the fourth among the eighteen candidates and the final elected member.

By her second year on the seven-member board, she was a unanimous selection to be second in command as Columbus School Board Vice President. She was unanimously re-elected the following year. In her fourth year of service on the board beginning on January 3, 1995, she lost a 4–3 election for Columbus School Board President when the incumbent, Robert W. Teater, cast a tie-breaking vote for himself. She subsequently declined the vice presidency. During her fourth year, she unsuccessfully attempted to include a sexual orientation policy in the school district's nondiscrimination policy that would protect homosexuals. She was reelected in 1995. In 1996, she contested Ohio's 16th district seat in the Ohio State Senate with Eugene Watts, but she lost by a 51.80–37.46% margin in a five-way contest.

Still on the school board, she resumed her vice presidency on January 5, 1998. She ascended to the Columbus School Board President position for her eighth year of service to the board on January 4, 1999. During this eighth year, she decided not to run for re-election to a third term in order to spend more time with her family.

On January 6, 2000, she won one of the Franklin County Democratic Party's two nominations for one of two seats to the three-member Board of County Commissioners. The board oversees the Franklin County government's $1.3 billion budget and programs that range from child welfare to job training to minor league baseball. On November 7, 2000, she became the first Democrat elected as a Franklin County Commissioner in eight years. She won by a 48–47% margin by capturing 55 of 74 wards and 90% of the vote in six inner-city wards. She served as the Board's lone Democrat until she was re-elected to a second four-year term and Paula Brooks was elected on November 2, 2004, to give Democrats the majority for the first time in twenty years. In her re-election she won by a 28,500 vote margin, which was substantially more than the 4,300 vote margin in 2000. During both elections, she won despite being widely outspent. She assumed the role of Board President on January 10, 2005.

Governing magazine named Franklin County as being among the five best-managed counties in the country during Kilroy's tenure. Also, Kilroy was named the Public Official of the Year by the Central Ohio Chapter of the National Association of Social Workers as a result of her role in creating the Columbus/Franklin County Affordable Housing Trust. Her term as commissioner was not without controversy, however. Kilroy came under fire during the awarding of contracts for the construction of Huntington Park because the lowest bid for the concrete was rejected in favor of a higher bid by a union shop. Eventually, the issue went to court and the commissioners decided to award the contract to the low bidder. She lost the 2006 race for U.S. Representative from Ohio's 15th congressional district to Deborah Pryce, 50.2%–49.7%.

== U.S. House of Representatives ==
=== Elections ===
2006

Franklin County, which has elected Kilroy twice, makes up 87% of the 15th Congressional district. The 2006 race in Ohio's 15th district gained significant national attention as it was seen as one of a handful of seats that Democrats had an opportunity to gain from Republicans. As of mid-October, the race was generally considered to be a toss-up largely due to incumbent representative Pryce's leadership in the Republican Party. Pryce had not had a close contest since her first election in 1992 and had garnered 10% more of the vote than George W. Bush in 2004. However, Pryce was vulnerable due to Ohio Republican Party (Bob Taft and Bob Ney) scandals, the lagging Ohio economy, her association with controversial Dennis Hastert and Mark Foley, and backlash to Republican support of the Iraq War. Another Ohio Republican scandal in the minds of Ohio voters during the 2006 campaign was the Coingate scandal. Pryce and the Republicans had to keep conservative independent, Charles Morrison, off the ballot to have their best shot at success. A month before the election, Pryce was 12 points behind Kilroy. On the eve of the election, some experts, such as Time, considered Pryce the underdog. Kilroy was expected to be the beneficiary of the decade-long migration of conservative voters to suburbs outside of the district.

Kilroy made an issue of Pryce's knowledge of the Foley scandal and the need for Hastert to resign. Kilroy also linked her opponent to the unpopular Republican administration and congressional majority. After Foley resigned following the page scandal, Kilroy attacked Pryce with the conservative religious voters. Kilroy ran radio commercials on Christian and conservative radio stations in an attempt to appeal to family-values-oriented listeners.

Two debates were held for this race during the 2006 election cycle. The first took place September 18, and the second was on October 12. In the first debate Kilroy and incumbent U.S. Representative, Pryce discussed the war in Iraq, the War on Terror, taxes, social security, the federal deficit and President Bush. In the final week before the election, Pryce attempted to demand another debate.

The second debate was marked by a more heated exchange on behalf of both participants. Kilroy referred to Pryce as a "right-wing apologist" and said that "Deborah Pryce continues to distort my record." Meanwhile, Pryce described her opponent as a "far left fringe Democrat" and said that Kilroy "spews lies and misinformation." The debate was attended by 400 people at the Ohio State University Fawcett Center and reporters from as far away as Ireland.

After regular ballots were counted, Pryce led Kilroy by over 3,500 votes with about 19,000 provisional ballots outstanding. The Franklin county absentee and provisional ballots were not counted until approximately two weeks after the election. On Monday November 27, nearly three weeks after Election Day, Pryce was declared the winner by a 1,054 vote margin that mandated a recount. After two recounts and all of the votes were counted, Congresswoman Deborah Pryce (R) prevailed over Democratic challenger Mary Jo Kilroy. The Franklin County Board of Elections announced the results Monday morning December 11, 2006. Pryce (R) gained 25 votes and Kilroy (D) gained 18 votes in the recount of votes in Franklin, Union, and Madison Counties in Ohio. Pryce won by a vote of 110,739 to 109,677. Kilroy felt her campaign was slowed by the early candidacy of fellow Franklin County Commissioner Paula Brooks, who eventually withdrew. Immediately after losing in 2006, she announced she would recontest the seat in 2008.

2008

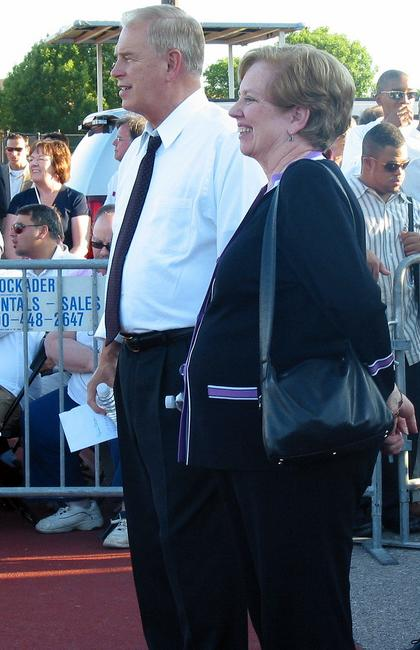
Ted Strickland and Kilroy at Obama-Biden rally in Dublin, Ohio (2008-08-30)

November 4, 2008.
Ohio's 15th congressional district

Candidate	Votes	Percentage
Kilroy	139,582	45.94
Stivers	137,271	45.18
Noble	14,061	4.63
Eckhart	12,915	4.25
Write-in	6	0

In August 2007, incumbent Pryce announced her retirement at the end of her elected term. The Democrats felt that the seat continued to be vulnerable. Kilroy announced her intention to again seek the 15th District seat in 2008. She ran against Republican Steve Stivers, a state senator from the 16th District, Libertarian Mark M. Noble, and Independent candidate Don Elijah Eckhart. The race was considered to be one of the most important U.S. House of Representatives races to watch in the country. The last Democrat to hold the 15th district was Robert T. Secrest in the mid-1960s, but with Republican voters moving out of the district into the northern suburbs of Columbus, Ohio since the 1990s, the district became more evenly matched.

In April 2008, the Sierra Club again endorsed Kilroy's candidacy due to her history of environmental advocacy and Stivers' contributions from energy and tobacco companies. During the campaign, Kilroy linked Stivers to big business, bank lobbyists, predatory lending and the 2008 financial crisis. Stivers countered by linking Kilroy to liberal media and influence peddling.

Stivers led Kilroy by a 129,852–129,703 margin with 100% of the Election Day precincts counted, but before the provisional ballots were counted. On November 25, 2008, Madison and Union counties concluded their absentee, military, and provisional ballot counting and Stivers claimed a net gain resulting in a 594-vote lead. On December 5, 2008, Stivers' supporters won a ruling in the Ohio Supreme Court that the 1,000 provisional ballots that lacked signatures or had names and signatures in the wrong places be thrown out. On December 7, 2008, Franklin County Election Canvassers completed their final ballot count, which included absentee, military, and provisional ballots received within ten days of Election Day, giving Kilroy a victory margin of 2,311 votes over Stivers. This margin exceeds the automatic recount margin of 0.5%. Stivers conceded the race to Kilroy later on Sunday. The late ballots that weighed on the election were of three types: military and overseas absentee ballots postmarked by the time the polls closed Tuesday November 4 and received by November 14; domestic absentee ballots postmarked by Monday November 3 that are received by November 14; absentee ballots with errors that voters correct by November 14.

Kilroy became the first Democrat to represent the district in 42 years (since Secrest). She is only the second Democrat to represent a significant portion of Columbus since 1967. The last Democrat to represent the city, Bob Shamansky, represented the neighboring 12th District from 1981 to 1983.

2010

In June 2009, Stivers announced his candidacy for a rematch in 2010. According to an op-ed in The New York Times, one issue upon which Stivers and Kilroy differed was the prospective repeal of the Seventeenth Amendment to the United States Constitution, which provides direct election of United States Senators. Stivers backpedaled on his support of the repeal after Kilroy made an issue of his stance. The race was one of the most closely watched in the United States House of Representatives elections, 2010, and it included a third party candidate. The Republican Party marked it as one of their targeted races according to a U.S. News & World Report article. Time accurately predicted that Kilroy might have trouble in her historically Republican district given the electoral backlash to spending by the Obama Administration and because of her mostly party line voting record. On November 2, 2010, Stivers won the rematch.

=== Tenure ===
Congresswoman Kilroy introduced legislation including a bill to start a three-year pilot program to lend $20 million per year to small businesses (HR5322) and introduced an amendment to assign liability to credit reporting agencies which passed. She voted with the Democratic majority for the federal stimulus package, the Lilly Ledbetter Fair Pay Act of 2009, the cap and trade carbon emissions legislation, and the federal health insurance reform legislation.

Kilroy helped shape the Congressional Bill on executive pay that eventually became law by proposing an amendment requiring large institutional investors to reveal how they vote the shares that they own on pay proposals affecting companies that issued those shares. While serving her first term, she felt attached to the cause of health care reform because it had been an emphasis in her electoral platform.

=== Committee assignments ===
- Committee on Financial Services
  - Subcommittee on Capital Markets, Insurance, and Government-Sponsored Enterprises
  - Subcommittee on Housing and Community Opportunity
  - Subcommittee on Oversight and Investigations
- Committee on Homeland Security
  - Subcommittee on Emerging Threats, Cybersecurity, and Science and Technology
  - Subcommittee on Management, Investigations, and Oversight

=== Caucus membership ===
- Congressional Progressive Caucus

== 2012 congressional election ==
Kilroy ran in the newly redrawn, Columbus-based Ohio's 3rd congressional district in 2012. Despite being endorsed by House Democratic Leader Nancy Pelosi, she lost the Democratic primary to former state representative Joyce Beatty, who defeated Kilroy, Tyson, and Celeste 38%-35%-15%-12%. Kilroy lost a 2014 election for Franklin County Court of Appeals.

== Personal life ==
Mary Jo Kilroy currently resides in the Clintonville neighborhood of Columbus. Kilroy owned three dogs from animal rescue organizations at the time of the 2006 election.

== See also ==
- Women in the United States House of Representatives

U.S. House of Representatives
Preceded by Deborah Pryce	Member of the U.S. House of Representatives from Ohio's 15th congressional district 2009–2011	Succeeded by Steve Stivers
U.S. order of precedence (ceremonial)
Preceded by Steve Driehaus as Former U.S. Representative	Order of precedence of the United States as Former U.S. Representative	Succeeded by Joseph Cao as Former U.S. Representative
