= Percy W. Griffiths =

American politician (1893-1983)

Percy W. (Red) Griffiths
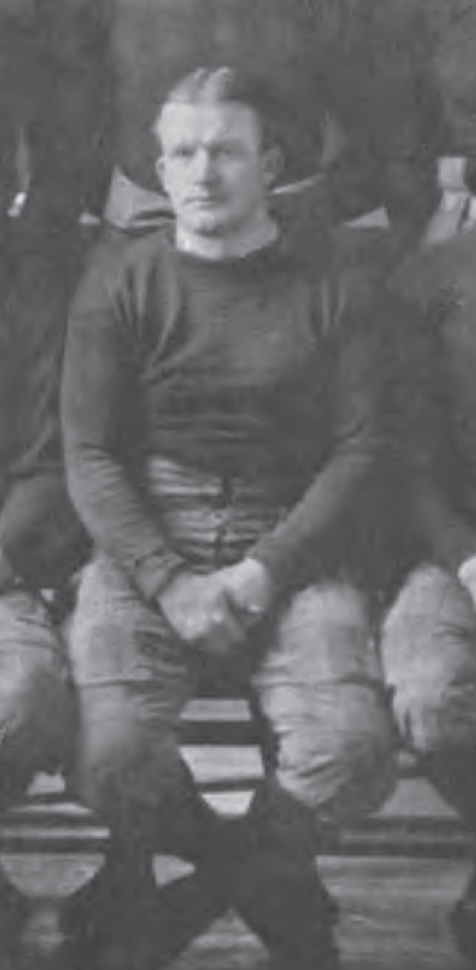
- Griffiths on 1920 Penn State football team

Member of the U.S. House of Representatives from Ohio's 15th district
- In office January 3, 1943 – January 3, 1949
- Preceded by: Robert T. Secrest
- Succeeded by: Robert T. Secrest

Personal details
- Born: Percy Wilfred Griffiths; March 30, 1893 Taylor, Pennsylvania, U.S.
- Died: June 12, 1983 (aged 90) Clearwater, Florida, U.S.
- Party: Republican
- Coaching career

Biographical details
- Education: Penn State; Columbia University

Playing career

Football
- 1917–1920: Penn State
- 1921: Canton Bulldogs
- Position: Guard

Coaching career (HC unless noted)

Football
- 1921–1926: Marietta
- 1927–1928: Penn State (assistant)
- 1929–1930: Dickinson

Basketball
- 1922–1927: Marietta

Baseball
- c. 1925: Marietta

Administrative career (AD unless noted)
- 1921–1927: Marietta

Head coaching record
- Overall: 16–41–10 (football); 31–34 (basketball); 17–15 (baseball)

Accomplishments and honors

Awards
- First-team All-American (1920)

Percy Wilfred "Red" Griffiths (March 30, 1893 – June 12, 1983) was an American veteran of World War I who played and coached football before becoming a politician.

He played college football at Pennsylvania State College—now known as Pennsylvania State University and professionally for one season in the National Football League (NFL) with the Canton Bulldogs. Griffiths was the head football coach at Marietta College in Marietta, Ohio from 1921 to 1926 and Dickinson College in Carlisle, Pennsylvania from 1929 to 1930.

Politically, he was the mayor of Marietta, Ohio in 1938 and 1939, and served three terms in the United States House of Representatives, representing Ohio's 15th congressional district from 1943 to 1949.

== Early life and playing career ==
After serving in the United States Navy during World War I, "Red" Griffiths attended Bloomsburg Normal School. He moved on to Pennsylvania State College where he played college football as a guard for Hugo Bezdek's undefeated 1920 team. Griffith was named to the 1920 College Football All-America Team. He also lettered in lacrosse for the Nittany Lions and earned a Bachelor of Science in chemistry from Penn State in 1921. He played one professional season (1921) with the Canton Bulldogs of the National Football League (NFL).

== Coaching career ==
=== Marietta ===
Griffiths was the athletic director and coached football, basketball and baseball at Marietta College in Marietta, Ohio from 1921 to 1927. He coached football at Marietta from 1921 until the end of the 1926 season, accumulating a record of 14–28–7. While at Marietta, he also coached men's basketball from 1922 until 1927.

=== Dickinson ===
Griffiths was the 21st head football coach at Dickinson College in Carlisle, Pennsylvania, serving for two seasons, from 1929 to 1930, and compiling a record of 2–13–3.

== Political career and later life ==
Griffiths continued his education at Columbia University, graduating in 1930. He served as Marietta's mayor from 1938 to 1939 and later represented Washington County, Ohio and Ohio's 15th congressional district in the 78th, 79th, and 80th U.S. Congresses for three terms from 1943 to 1949. Griffiths retired to Clearwater, Florida in 1952, where he lived until his death at the age of 90, in 1983.

== Head coaching record ==
=== Football ===
Year	Team	Overall	Conference	Standing	Bowl/playoffs
Marietta Pioneers (Independent) (1921–1925)
1921	Marietta	3–4–3			
1922	Marietta	2–5–1			
1923	Marietta	7–2			
1924	Marietta	1–6–1			
1925	Marietta	0–4–2			
Marietta Pioneers (Ohio Athletic Conference) (1926)
1926	Marietta	1–7	1–6	T–19th	
Marietta:		14–28–7	1–6		
Dickinson Red and White (Eastern Pennsylvania Collegiate Conference) (1929–1930)
1929	Dickinson	2–7–1	0–3–1	5th	
1930	Dickinson	0–6–2	0–4	4th	
Dickinson:		2–13–3	0–7–1		
Total:		16–41–10			

U.S. House of Representatives
Preceded by Robert T. Secrest	United States Representative (District 15) from Ohio; 1943–1949	Succeeded by Robert T. Secrest
