= John E. Henderson =

American politician

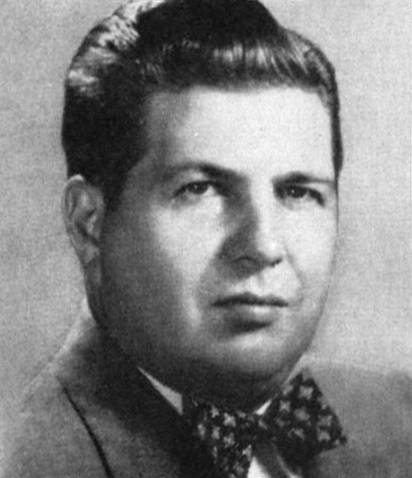

Member of the U.S. House of Representatives from Ohio's 15th district
- In office January 3, 1955 – January 3, 1961
- Preceded by: Robert T. Secrest
- Succeeded by: Tom V. Moorehead

Member of the Ohio House of Representatives
- In office 1951-1954

Personal details
- Born: John Earl Henderson; January 4, 1917 Crafton, Pennsylvania, U.S.
- Died: December 3, 1994 (aged 77) Cambridge, Ohio, U.S.
- Resting place: Northwood Cemetery, Cambridge, Guernsey County, Ohio, U.S. (Plot: Section 65 Lot 83)
- Party: Republican
- Education: Ohio Wesleyan University; University of Michigan Law School

John Earl Henderson (January 4, 1917 – December 3, 1994) was an American lawyer, jurist, and politician of the Republican Party who served three terms in the United States House of Representatives from 1955 to 1961.

== Biography ==
Henderson was born on January 4, 1917, at Crafton, Pennsylvania. He moved to Cambridge, Ohio, in 1920, and moved to a dairy farm in nearby Guernsey County in 1922. He attended the schools of Guernsey County, and high school at Cambridge. He graduated from the Ohio Wesleyan University at Delaware, Ohio, in 1939 and from the University of Michigan Law School at Ann Arbor, Michigan, in 1942.

=== Military service ===
He joined the United States Army as a private in 1942, and rose to captain of infantry after service in Europe. He was discharged in 1946 and commenced practice in Cambridge.

=== Congress ===
Henderson was elected to the Ohio House of Representatives from 1951 to 1954, and elected as a Republican to the 84th through 86th Congresses, (January 3, 1955 – January 3, 1961). Henderson voted in favor of the Civil Rights Acts of 1957 and 1960.

=== Later career ===
He was not a candidate for re-nomination in 1960, and resumed law practice in Cambridge. He was a judge of the Guernsey County Court of Common Pleas from 1980 to 1986, and resided in Cambridge until his death on December 3, 1994.

His remains were interred at Northwood Cemetery in Cambridge.

== Links ==
- John E. Henderson at Find a Grave

U.S. House of Representatives
Preceded by Robert T. Secrest	Member of the U.S. House of Representatives from Ohio's 15th congressional district 1955–1961	Succeeded by Tom V. Moorehead
