= Deborah Pryce =

American politician (born 1951)

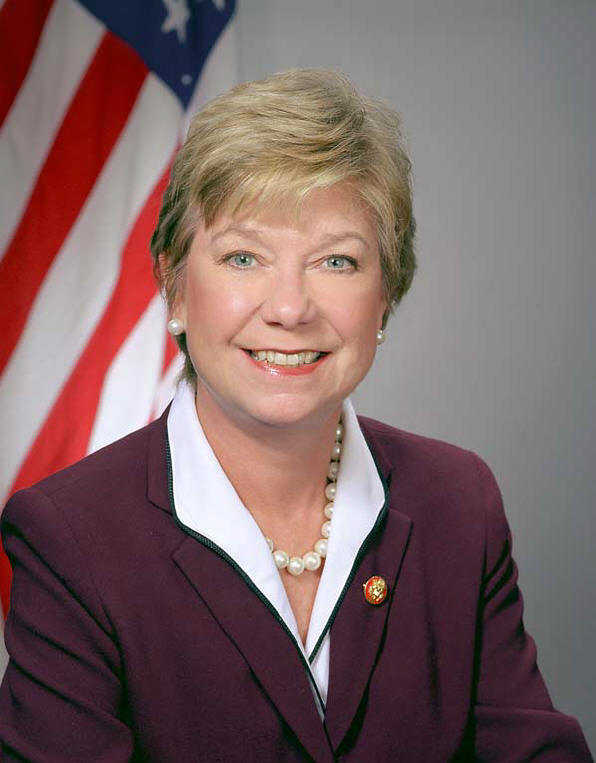

Chair of the House Republican Conference
- In office January 3, 2003 – January 3, 2007
- Leader: Dennis Hastert
- Vice Chair: Jack Kingston
- Preceded by: J. C. Watts
- Succeeded by: Adam Putnam

Vice Chair of the House Republican Conference
- In office January 3, 2001 – January 3, 2003
- Leader: Dennis Hastert
- Preceded by: Tillie Fowler
- Succeeded by: Jack Kingston

Secretary of the House Republican Conference
- In office January 3, 1999 – January 3, 2001
- Leader: Dennis Hastert
- Preceded by: Tillie Fowler
- Succeeded by: Barbara Cubin

Member of the U.S. House of Representatives from Ohio's 15th district
- In office January 3, 1993 – January 3, 2009
- Preceded by: Chalmers Wylie
- Succeeded by: Mary Jo Kilroy

Personal details
- Born: July 29, 1951 (age 75) Warren, Ohio, U.S.
- Party: Republican
- Education: Ohio State University (BA); Capital University (JD)

Deborah Denine Pryce (born July 29, 1951) is an American lawyer, jurist, and politician from Ohio who was the member of the United States House of Representatives for Ohio's 15th congressional district, which includes the western half of Columbus and the surrounding suburbs, from 1993 to 2009. She is a member of the Republican Party.

== Education and early career ==
Born in Warren, Ohio, Pryce is a 1973 graduate of Ohio State University, where she was a member of Alpha Xi Delta. In 1976, she graduated from Capital University Law School.

Pryce was an administrative law judge for the Ohio State Department of Insurance for 1976–1978. From 1978 to 1985 she worked for the city of Columbus, Ohio, first as an assistant city prosecutor, then as a senior assistant city attorney, and finally as an assistant city manager.

Pryce was a judge in the Franklin County Municipal Court from 1985 to 1992, ending as presiding judge.

== Congressional career ==
Pryce was first elected to the U.S. House in November 1992. Until the election of 2006, she was the Chair of the House Republican Conference, which is the fourth-highest Republican position in the United States House of Representatives. This position has been held by J. C. Watts, Dick Cheney and Jack Kemp, among others. She also served as a deputy Republican whip.

Pryce was a member of the House Committee on Financial Services and was ranking minority member of the Capital Markets, Insurance, and Government-Sponsored Enterprises Subcommittee. She returned to the committee after spending ten years on the House Rules Committee.

Pryce is a fiscally and socially conservative Republican, although she was a member of multiple center right groups such as the Republican Main Street Partnership, Republicans For Environmental Protection, the Republican Majority For Choice, Republicans for Choice and The Wish List (a pro-choice women's group). She does not favor banning abortion, saying "the Government should not interfere in decisions a woman makes about her pregnancy."

In November 2006, when asked about the war in Iraq, Pryce ended an interview with CNN by walking away. In a statement later issued to CNN, Pryce said: "What's happening in Iraq is not a direct reflection on me." The statement also said that "I voted to give the president the authority to use force in Iraq; that doesn't mean I'm always happy with what I see, but I can think of nothing worse for our troops or our prospects for success than having 435 members of Congress second-guessing our commanders."

Pryce voted to make the United States Environmental Protection Agency a cabinet department, to expedite forest thinning projects, and to de-authorize "critical habitat" designated by the Endangered Species Act. The League of Conservation Voters (LCV) has named her to its "Dirty Dozen" list of environmentally irresponsible federal officeholders; the organization gave Pryce an environmental score of 13 out of 100 for 2006 and 16 out of 100 for her career record. LCV also criticized Price for accepting more than $90,000 from oil and gas companies and for voting in accordance with energy interests.

== Votes in the 110th Congress ==
Formerly in charge of keeping GOP House members in line with the party's message, Pryce appeared in early 2007 to be changing her voting record, according to The Washington Post, on January 14, 2007: "After narrowly escaping defeat in November, the swing-district Republican bolted from her party's leadership last year. Last week, she virtually bolted from the party. With just one exception, Pryce sided with the new Democratic majority on every major bill and rule change that came to a vote in the past two weeks, even voting against her party on a procedural vote, a move considered heretical in the years of GOP control."

However, on the topic of Iraq, which the House discussed in detail in winter and early spring of 2007, Pryce sided firmly with her Republican colleagues, supporting Ohio Republican congressman John Boehner's H.R. 1062, "holding the Administration and the Iraqi government accountable for progress in the prosecution of the war in Iraq." The bill "requires the President to submit a status report to Congress every 30 days detailing the success of the recent 21,500 troop increase and the extent to which the Iraqi government is cooperating with the US stability efforts. It also creates a bipartisan panel to study proposals from relevant committees, the executive branch, and private sector entities concerning the development of US policy and strategy in Iraq."

During her successful 2006 campaign to retain her seat, Pryce distanced herself from the Bush administration by stating on CNN radio that, "What's happening in Iraq is not a direct reflection on me."

== Elections ==
In her first election in 1992, Pryce won in a three-way race in which an independent conservative, pro-life candidate, Linda Reidelbach, received almost 20% of the vote; Pryce got slightly over 45%. Between 1994 and 2002, Pryce won with at least 2/3 of the vote each election.

In the 2004 Republican party primary, Pryce defeated Charles R. Morrison II, 84%–16%. She won the general election with 62% of the vote, defeating Democrat Mark P. Brown. She had previously defeated Brown in the November 2002 election.

=== 2006 race ===
In the November 2006 general election, Pryce faced Democratic Franklin County Commissioner Mary Jo Kilroy .

The race in Ohio's 15th district gained significant national attention as one of a handful of seats that Democrats had an opportunity to gain from Republicans. In mid-October 2006, the race was generally considered to be a toss-up largely due to Pryce's high-ranking post in the Republican leadership as well as the strong anti-Republican mood in Ohio. The 15th had long been considered the more Republican of the two districts that divide Columbus but had become slightly less Republican as a result of the 2000 round of redistricting.

In an article titled "Pork No Longer Paves the Way to Reelection," the Amherst Times cited Deborah Pryce as a counterexample of that thesis:

"[In] several races... the ability to bring home hundreds of federal projects might have made enough of a difference to withstand a Democratic tide. Representative Deborah Pryce of Ohio, the fourth-ranking Republican in the House, issued dozens of news releases over the last 18 months boasting of the projects she brought home to a district that is considered evenly divided between the two parties[:] $2.27 million to convert a mountain of garbage into a green energy center, $1.1 million to help keep residents of a fast-growing suburb from having to pay more in user fees for a new sewage system, and the latest installment in $2.7 million in federal disbursements to 'evaluate freeze-dried berries for their ability to inhibit cancer'.... [At one point] Ms. Pryce's district stood to get the largest single earmark in Ohio—$1.75 million for a health research institute. In total, the Columbus area lined up about $4.5 million in special money.... By comparison, Portland, Ore.—a similar-sized metropolitan area with no contested Congressional seats—was to receive $625,000 in earmarks."

Two debates were held for the 2006 congressional race. The first took place September 18 and the second was held on October 12. In the first debate Pryce and her challenger, Kilroy discussed the war in Iraq, the war on terror, taxes, social security, the federal deficit and President Bush.

The second debate was marked by a more heated exchange from both participants. Kilroy referred to Pryce as a "right-wing apologist" and said that "Deborah Pryce continues to distort my record." Pryce countered by describing her opponent as a "far left fringe Democrat" and said that Kilroy, "spews lies and misinformation." The debate was attended by 400 people at the Ohio State University Fawcett Center and reporters from as far away as Ireland.

Pryce received a number of endorsements for the 15th District race in 2006, including: the Business and Professional Women, the Franklin County Republican Party, Union County Republican Party Executive Committee, National Federation of Independent Business, the U.S. Chamber of Commerce and the Fraternal Order of Police. The Human Rights Campaign gave a dual endorsement to both Pryce and her opponent, Kilroy.

Pryce's 2006 race against Kilroy was very close, as she held a lead of 3,536 votes after an initial count. Complete tallies found Pryce winning rural Madison and Union counties but losing her portion of Franklin County (urban Columbus) by several thousand votes. Pryce ended Election Night 1,055 votes ahead of Kilroy, but the difference was within a half-percentage point, which triggered an automatic recount under Ohio law.

After the mandatory recount resulted in 110,739 Pryce votes to 109,677 for Kilroy, Pryce was certified the winner.

== Retirement ==
On August 16, 2007, Pryce announced she would not run for a ninth term, citing a desire to spend more time with her daughter and aging parents.

Pryce's term ended on January 3, 2009. Price was succeeded by Mary Jo Kilroy, who had lost to her two years before.

In 2013, Pryce was a signatory to an amicus curiae brief submitted to the Supreme Court in support of same-sex marriage during the Hollingsworth v. Perry case.

== See also ==
- List of United States representatives from Ohio
- Women in the United States House of Representatives

U.S. House of Representatives
| Preceded by Chalmers Wylie | Member of the U.S. House of Representatives from Ohio's 15th congressional district 1993–2009 | Succeeded by Mary Jo Kilroy |
Party political offices
| Preceded by Tillie Fowler | Secretary of the House Republican Conference; 1999–2001 | Succeeded by Barbara Cubin |
| Preceded by Tillie Fowler | Vice Chair of the House Republican Conference; 2001–2003 | Succeeded by Jack Kingston |
| Preceded by J. C. Watts | Chair of the House Republican Conference; 2003–2007 | Succeeded by Adam Putnam |
U.S. order of precedence (ceremonial)
| Preceded by Zach Wamp as Former U.S. Representative | Order of precedence of the United States as Former U.S. Representative | Succeeded by Dennis Kucinich as Former U.S. Representative |
