= Tom Van Horn Moorehead =

American politician (1898–1979)

Tom Moorehead
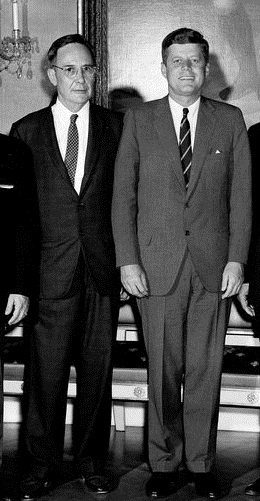
- In the Blue Room of the White House, May 25, 1961, with President John F. Kennedy

Member of the U.S. House of Representatives from Ohio's 15th district
- In office January 3, 1961 - January 3, 1963
- Preceded by: John E. Henderson
- Succeeded by: Robert T. Secrest

Member of the Ohio Senate from the 20th district
- In office January 3, 1967-December 31, 1968
- Preceded by: Districts Created
- Succeeded by: Robert T. Secrest

Personal details
- Born: April 12, 1898 Zanesville, Ohio
- Died: October 21, 1979 (aged 81) Zanesville, Ohio
- Resting place: Greenwood Cemetery, Zanesville
- Party: Republican
- Education: Ohio Wesleyan University; George Washington University

Tom Van Horn Moorehead (April 12, 1898 – October 21, 1979) was an American politician who served as a Republican member of the U.S. House of Representatives from Ohio from 1961 to 1963.

== Biography ==
Moorehead was born in Zanesville, Ohio. He attended the public schools, Ohio Wesleyan University at Delaware, Ohio, and George Washington University at Washington, D.C. During the First World War, he served in United States Naval Aviation Corps. He was engaged in the real estate and insurance business in Zanesville, and served as a member of city council and mayor of Zanesville. He was a member of the Ohio Senate serving eight terms.

=== Congress ===
Moorehead was elected as a Republican to the Eighty-seventh Congress. He was an unsuccessful candidate for reelection in 1962 to the Eighty-eighth Congress.

=== Death ===
He resided in Zanesville, where he died October 21, 1979. Interment in Greenwood Cemetery.

== Sources ==
- United States Congress. "Tom Van Horn Moorehead (id: M000927)". Biographical Directory of the United States Congress.
- The Political Graveyard

U.S. House of Representatives
Preceded by John E. Henderson	Member of the U.S. House of Representatives from Ohio's 15th congressional district 1961–1963	Succeeded by Robert T. Secrest
