= 2004 United States House of Representatives elections in Ohio =

- November 2, 2004

All 18 Ohio seats to the United States House of Representatives
	Majority party	Minority party
Party	Republican	Democratic
Last election	12	6
Seats won	12	6
Seat change	Steady	Steady
Popular vote	2,650,122	2,514,615
Percentage	51.13%	48.51%
Swing	▼4.18%	▲5.40%

Republican
50–60%
60–70%
70–80%
Democratic
50–60%
60–70%
70–80%
80–90%
>90%

The 2004 United States House of Representatives elections in Ohio were held on Tuesday, November 2, 2004, to elect the 18 U.S. representatives from the state of Ohio, one from each of the state's 18 congressional districts. The elections coincided with the elections of other federal and state offices, including a presidential election and an election to the U.S. Senate.

== Overview ==
United States House of Representatives elections in Ohio, 2004
Party	Votes	Percentage	Seats before	Seats after	+/–
Republican	2,650,122	51.13%	12	12	-
Democratic	2,514,615	48.51%	6	6	-
Independent	18,771	0.36%	0	0	-
Totals	5,183,508	100%	18	18	—

== District 1 ==
2004 Ohio's 1st congressional district election
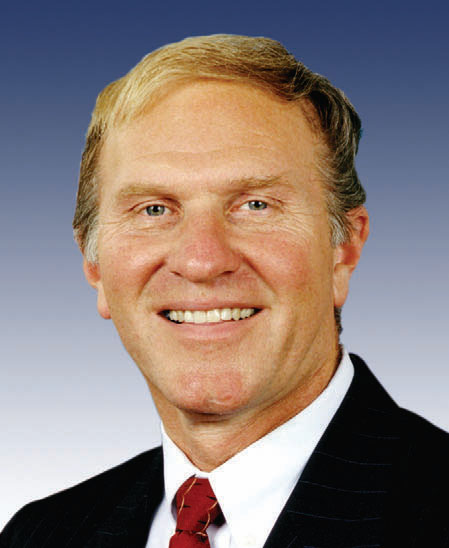

Nominee	Steve Chabot	Greg Harris
Party	Republican	Democratic
Popular vote	173,430	116,235
Percentage	59.8%	40.1%
- County results Chabot: 50–60% 70–80%
U.S. Representative before election
Steve Chabot
Republican
Elected U.S. Representative
Steve Chabot
Republican

=== Predictions ===
Source	Ranking	As of
The Cook Political Report	Safe R	October 29, 2004
Sabato's Crystal Ball	Safe R	November 1, 2004

=== Results ===
Ohio's 1st Congressional District election, 2004
Party	Candidate	Votes	%
Republican	Steve Chabot (Incumbent)	173,430	59.83
Democratic	Greg Harris	116,235	40.10
Independent	Rich Stevenson (Write-in)	198	0.07
Total votes		289,863	100
Republican hold			

== District 2 ==
2004 Ohio's 2nd congressional district election

Nominee	Rob Portman	Charles W. Sanders
Party	Republican	Democratic
Popular vote	227,102	89,598
Percentage	71.7%	28.3%
- County results Portman: 50–60% 70–80%
U.S. Representative before election
Rob Portman
Republican
Elected U.S. Representative
Rob Portman
Republican

=== Predictions ===
Source	Ranking	As of
The Cook Political Report	Safe R	October 29, 2004
Sabato's Crystal Ball	Safe R	November 1, 2004

=== Results ===
Ohio's 2nd Congressional District election, 2004
Party	Candidate	Votes	%
Republican	Rob Portman (Incumbent)	227,102	71.70
Democratic	Charles W. Sanders	89,598	28.29
Independent	James J. Condit, Jr. (Write-in)	60	0.02
Total votes		316,760	100
Republican hold			

== District 3 ==
2004 Ohio's 3rd congressional district election
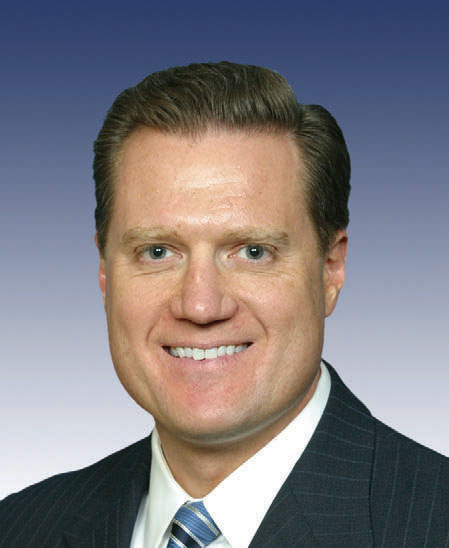

Nominee	Mike Turner	Jane Mitakides
Party	Republican	Democratic
Popular vote	197,290	119,448
Percentage	62.3%	37.7%
- County results Turner: 50–60% 60–70% 70–80%
U.S. Representative before election
Mike Turner
Republican
Elected U.S. Representative
Mike Turner
Republican

=== Predictions ===
Source	Ranking	As of
The Cook Political Report	Safe R	October 29, 2004
Sabato's Crystal Ball	Safe R	November 1, 2004

=== Results ===
Ohio's 3rd Congressional District election, 2004
Party	Candidate	Votes	%
Republican	Mike Turner (Incumbent)	197,290	62.29
Democratic	Jane Mitakides	119,448	37.71
Total votes		316,738	100
Republican hold			

== District 4 ==
2004 Ohio's 4th congressional district election
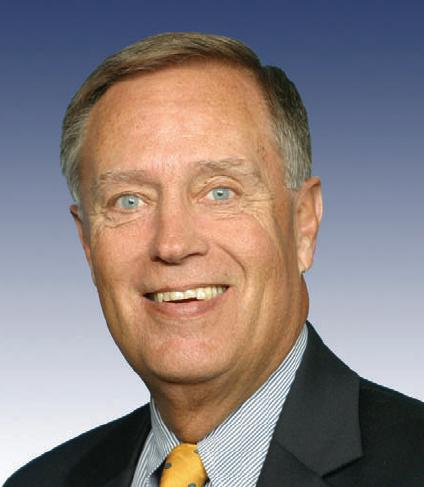

Nominee	Mike Oxley	Ben Konop
Party	Republican	Democratic
Popular vote	167,807	118,538
Percentage	58.6%	41.4%
- County results Oxley: 50–60% 60–70% 70–80% Konop: 50–60%
U.S. Representative before election
Mike Oxley
Republican
Elected U.S. Representative
Mike Oxley
Republican

=== Predictions ===
Source	Ranking	As of
The Cook Political Report	Safe R	October 29, 2004
Sabato's Crystal Ball	Safe R	November 1, 2004

=== Results ===
Ohio's 4th Congressional District election, 2004
Party	Candidate	Votes	%
Republican	Mike Oxley (Incumbent)	167,807	58.60
Democratic	Ben Konop	118,538	41.40
Total votes		286,345	100
Republican hold			

== District 5 ==
2004 Ohio's 5th congressional district election
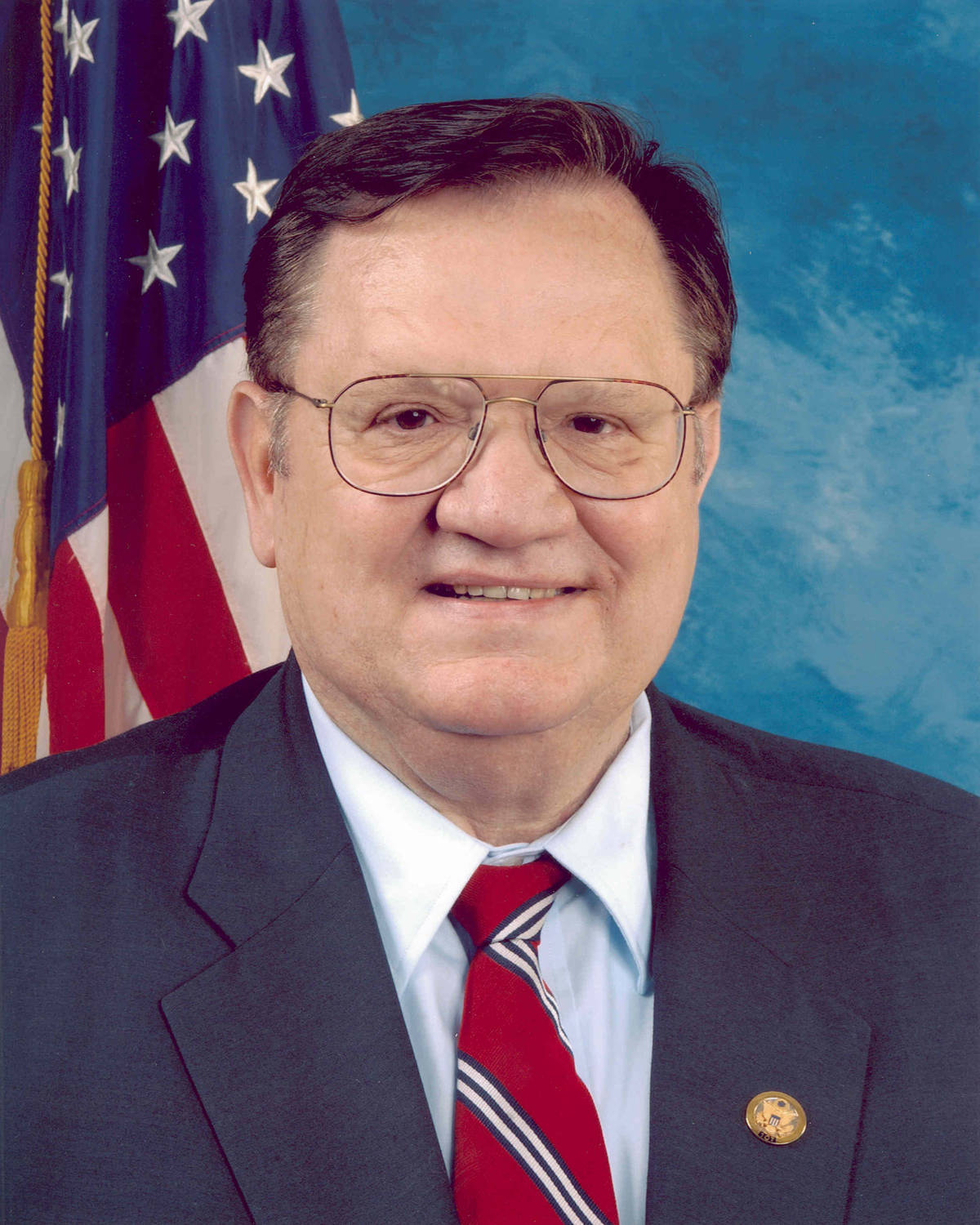

Nominee	Paul Gillmor	Robin Weirauch
Party	Republican	Democratic
Popular vote	196,649	96,656
Percentage	67.0%	33.0%
- County results Gillmor: 50–60% 60–70% 70–80%
U.S. Representative before election
Paul Gillmor
Republican
Elected U.S. Representative
Paul Gillmor
Republican

=== Predictions ===
Source	Ranking	As of
The Cook Political Report	Safe R	October 29, 2004
Sabato's Crystal Ball	Safe R	November 1, 2004

=== Results ===
Ohio's 5th Congressional District election, 2004
Party	Candidate	Votes	%
Republican	Paul Gillmor (Incumbent)	196,649	67.05
Democratic	Robin Weirauch	96,656	32.95
Total votes		293,305	100
Republican hold			

== District 6 ==
2004 Ohio's 6th congressional district election
- November 2, 2004
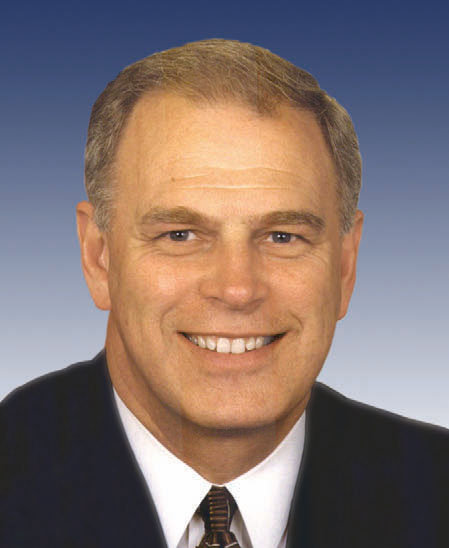
Nominee	Ted Strickland
Party	Democratic
Popular vote	223,844
Percentage	99.9%
- Strickland: 90–100%
U.S. Representative before election
Ted Strickland
Democratic
Elected U.S. Representative
Ted Strickland
Democratic

=== Predictions ===
Source	Ranking	As of
The Cook Political Report	Safe D	October 29, 2004
Sabato's Crystal Ball	Safe D	November 1, 2004

=== Results ===
Ohio's 6th Congressional District election, 2004
Party	Candidate	Votes	%
Democratic	Ted Strickland (Incumbent)	223,844	99.94
Independent	John Stephen Luchansky (Write-in)	145	0.06
Total votes		223,989	100
Democratic hold			

== District 7 ==
2004 Ohio's 7th congressional district election
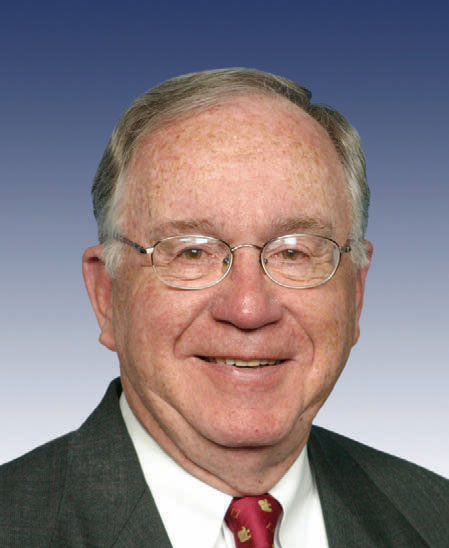

Nominee	Dave Hobson	Kara Anastasio
Party	Republican	Democratic
Popular vote	186,534	100,617
Percentage	65.0%	35.0%
- County results Hobson: 50–60% 60–70% 70–80%
U.S. Representative before election
Dave Hobson
Republican
Elected U.S. Representative
Dave Hobson
Republican

=== Predictions ===
Source	Ranking	As of
The Cook Political Report	Safe R	October 29, 2004
Sabato's Crystal Ball	Safe R	November 1, 2004

=== Results ===
Ohio's 7th Congressional District election, 2004
Party	Candidate	Votes	%
Republican	Dave Hobson (Incumbent)	186,534	64.96
Democratic	Kara Anastasio	100,617	35.04
Total votes		287,151	100
Republican hold			

== District 8 ==
2004 Ohio's 8th congressional district election
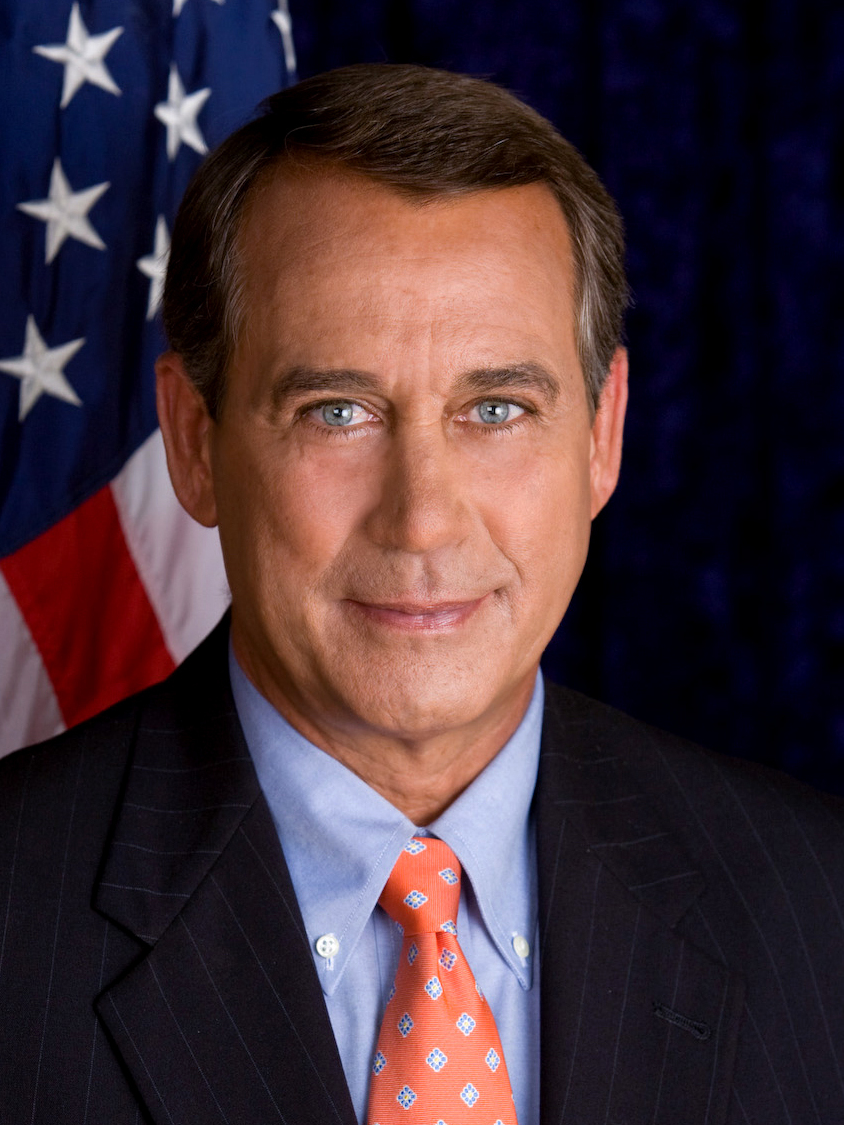

Nominee	John Boehner	Jeff Hardenbrook
Party	Republican	Democratic
Popular vote	201,675	90,574
Percentage	69.0%	31.0%
- County results Boehner: 50–60% 70–80%
U.S. Representative before election
John Boehner
Republican
Elected U.S. Representative
John Boehner
Republican

=== Predictions ===
Source	Ranking	As of
The Cook Political Report	Safe R	October 29, 2004
Sabato's Crystal Ball	Safe R	November 1, 2004

=== Results ===
Ohio's 8th Congressional District election, 2004
Party	Candidate	Votes	%
Republican	John Boehner (Incumbent)	201,675	69.01
Democratic	Jeff Hardenbrook	90,574	30.99
Total votes		292,249	100
Republican hold			

== District 9 ==
2004 Ohio's 9th congressional district election
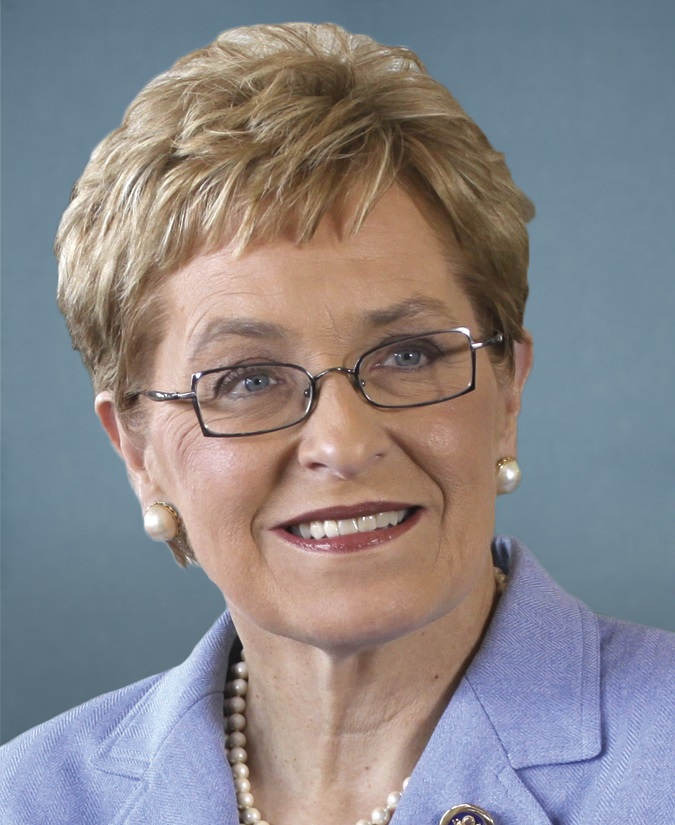

Nominee	Marcy Kaptur	Larry A. Kaczala
Party	Democratic	Republican
Popular vote	205,149	95,983
Percentage	68.1%	31.9%
- County results Kaptur: 50–60% 60–70% 70–80%
U.S. Representative before election
Marcy Kaptur
Democratic
Elected U.S. Representative
Marcy Kaptur
Democratic

=== Predictions ===
Source	Ranking	As of
The Cook Political Report	Safe D	October 29, 2004
Sabato's Crystal Ball	Safe D	November 1, 2004

=== Results ===
Ohio's 9th Congressional District election, 2004
Party	Candidate	Votes	%
Democratic	Marcy Kaptur (Incumbent)	205,149	68.13
Republican	Larry A. Kaczala	95,983	31.87
Total votes		301,132	100
Democratic hold			

== District 10 ==
2004 Ohio's 10th congressional district election
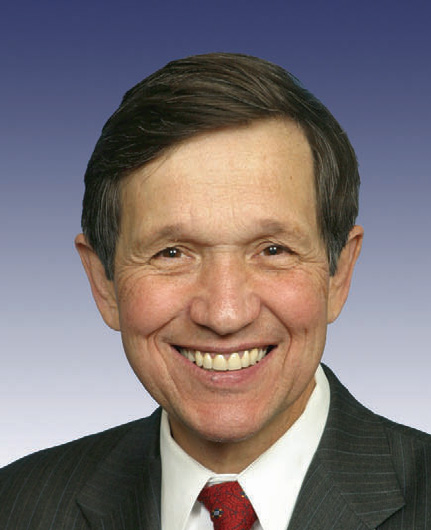

Nominee	Dennis Kucinich	Edward Fitzpatrick Herman	Barbara Anne Ferris
Party	Democratic	Republican	Independent
Popular vote	172,406	96,463	18,343
Percentage	60.0%	33.6%	6.4%
- County results Kucinich: 60–70%
U.S. Representative before election
Dennis Kucinich
Democratic
Elected U.S. Representative
Dennis Kucinich
Democratic

=== Predictions ===
Source	Ranking	As of
The Cook Political Report	Safe D	October 29, 2004
Sabato's Crystal Ball	Safe D	November 1, 2004

=== Results ===
Ohio's 10th Congressional District election, 2004
Party	Candidate	Votes	%
Democratic	Dennis Kucinich (Incumbent)	172,406	60.03
Republican	Edward Fitzpatrick Herman	96,463	33.59
Independent	Barbara Anne Ferris	18,343	6.39
Total votes		287,212	100
Democratic hold			

== District 11 ==
2004 Ohio's 11th congressional district election
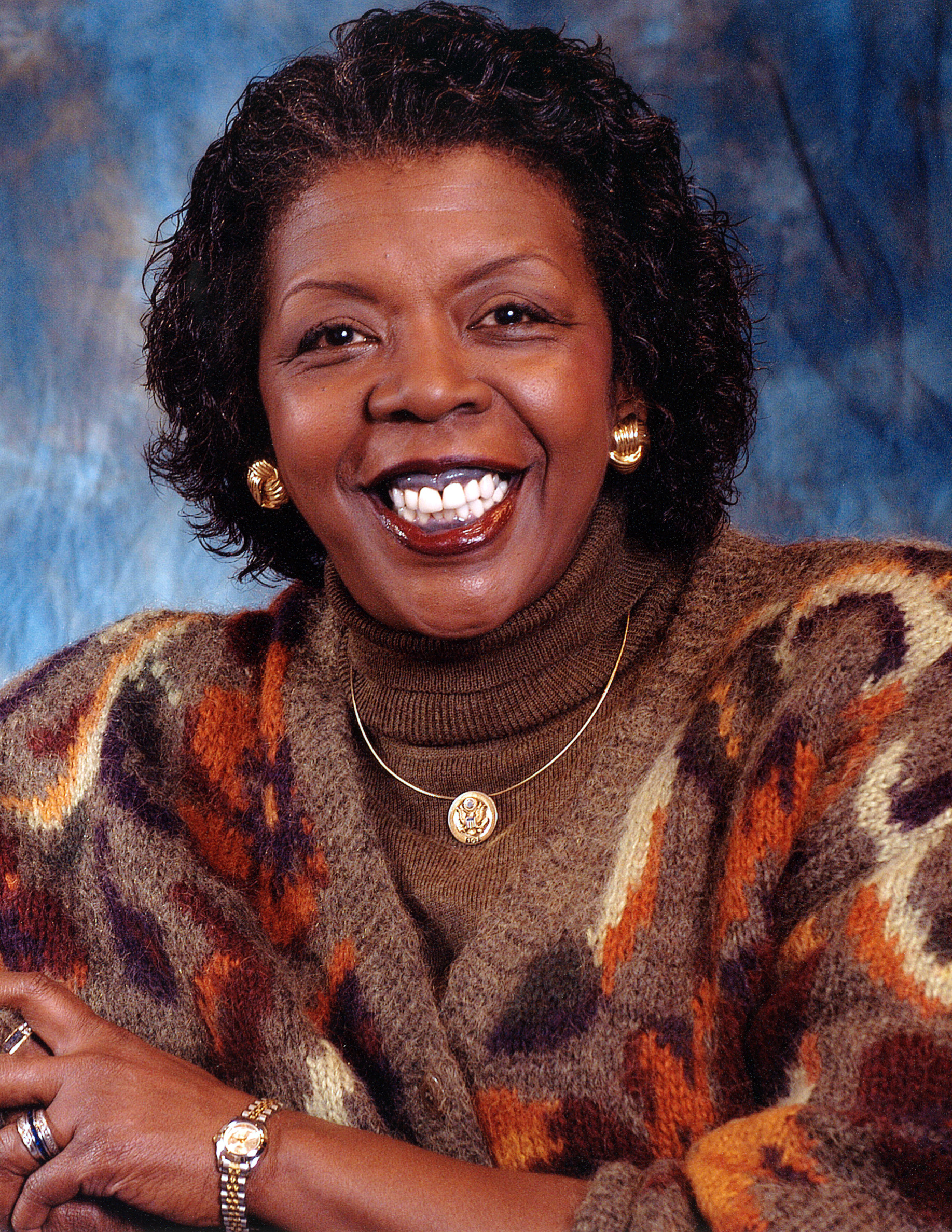
Nominee	Stephanie Tubbs Jones
Party	Democratic
Popular vote	222,371
Percentage	100.0%
U.S. Representative before election
Stephanie Tubbs Jones
Democratic
Elected U.S. Representative
Stephanie Tubbs Jones
Democratic

=== Predictions ===
Source	Ranking	As of
The Cook Political Report	Safe D	October 29, 2004
Sabato's Crystal Ball	Safe D	November 1, 2004

=== Results ===
Ohio's 11th Congressional District election, 2004
Party	Candidate	Votes	%
Democratic	Stephanie Tubbs Jones (Incumbent)	222,371	100
Democratic hold			

== District 12 ==
2004 Ohio's 12th congressional district election
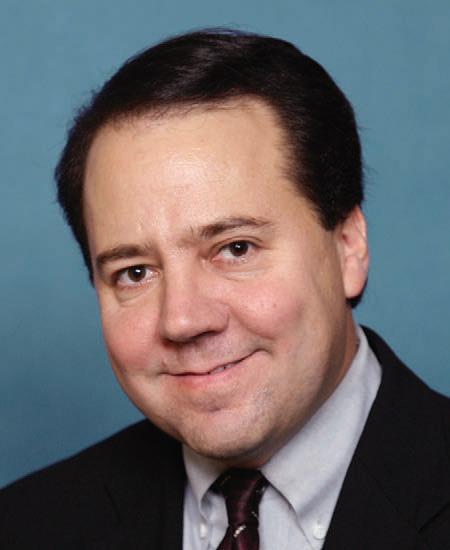

Nominee	Pat Tiberi	Edward S. Brown
Party	Republican	Democratic
Popular vote	198,912	122,109
Percentage	62.0%	38.0%
- County results Tiberi: 50–60% 70–80%
U.S. Representative before election
Pat Tiberi
Republican
Elected U.S. Representative
Pat Tiberi
Republican

=== Predictions ===
Source	Ranking	As of
The Cook Political Report	Safe R	October 29, 2004
Sabato's Crystal Ball	Safe R	November 1, 2004

=== Results ===
Ohio's 12th Congressional District election, 2004
Party	Candidate	Votes	%
Republican	Pat Tiberi (Incumbent)	198,912	61.96
Democratic	Edward S. Brown	122,109	38.03
Independent	Chuck Spingola (Write-in)	25	0.01
Total votes		321,046	100
Republican hold			

== District 13 ==
2004 Ohio's 13th congressional district election
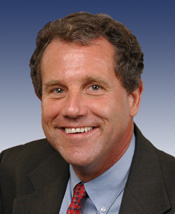

Nominee	Sherrod Brown	Robert Lucas
Party	Democratic	Republican
Popular vote	201,004	97,090
Percentage	67.4%	32.6%
- County results Brown: 50–60% 60–70% 70–80%
U.S. Representative before election
Sherrod Brown
Democratic
Elected U.S. Representative
Sherrod Brown
Democratic

=== Predictions ===
Source	Ranking	As of
The Cook Political Report	Safe D	October 29, 2004
Sabato's Crystal Ball	Safe D	November 1, 2004

=== Results ===
Ohio's 13th Congressional District election, 2004
Party	Candidate	Votes	%
Democratic	Sherrod Brown (Incumbent)	201,004	67.43
Republican	Robert Lucas	97,090	32.57
Total votes		298,094	100
Democratic hold			

== District 14 ==
2004 Ohio's 14th congressional district election
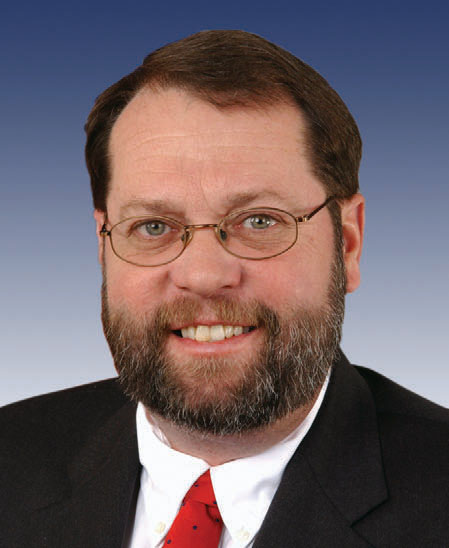

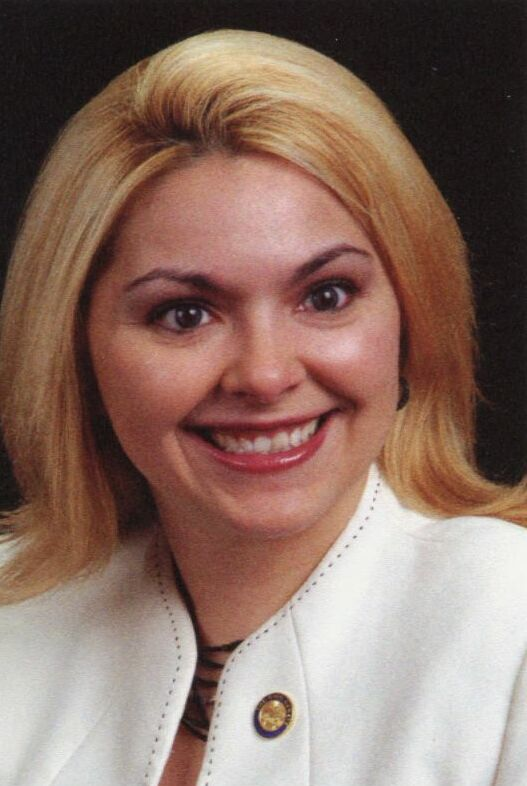
Nominee	Steven LaTourette	Capri Cafaro
Party	Republican	Democratic
Popular vote	201,652	119,714
Percentage	62.8%	37.3%
- County results Latourette: 50–60% 60–70%
U.S. Representative before election
Steven LaTourette
Republican
Elected U.S. Representative
Steven LaTourette
Republican

=== Predictions ===
Source	Ranking	As of
The Cook Political Report	Safe R	October 29, 2004
Sabato's Crystal Ball	Safe R	November 1, 2004

=== Results ===
Ohio's 14th Congressional District election, 2004
Party	Candidate	Votes	%
Republican	Steven LaTourette (Incumbent)	201,652	62.75
Democratic	Capri Cafaro	119,714	37.25
Total votes		321,366	100
Republican hold			

== District 15 ==
2004 Ohio's 15th congressional district election
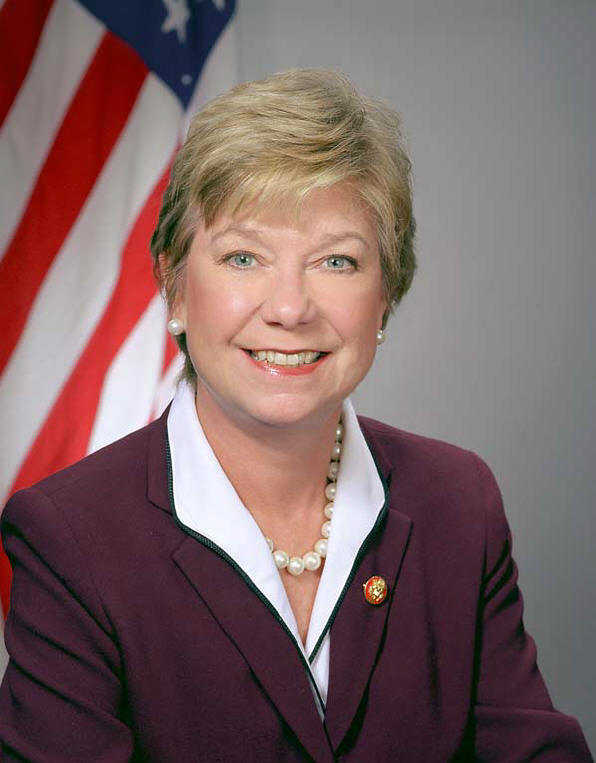

Nominee	Deborah Pryce	Mark P. Brown
Party	Republican	Democratic
Popular vote	166,520	110,915
Percentage	60.0%	40.0%
- County results Pryce: 50–60% 70–80%
U.S. Representative before election
Deborah Pryce
Republican
Elected U.S. Representative
Deborah Pryce
Republican

=== Predictions ===
Source	Ranking	As of
The Cook Political Report	Safe R	October 29, 2004
Sabato's Crystal Ball	Safe R	November 1, 2004

=== Results ===
Ohio's 15th Congressional District election, 2004
Party	Candidate	Votes	%
Republican	Deborah Pryce (Incumbent)	166,520	60.02
Democratic	Mark P. Brown	110,915	39.98
Total votes		277,435	100
Republican hold			

== District 16 ==
2004 Ohio's 16th congressional district election
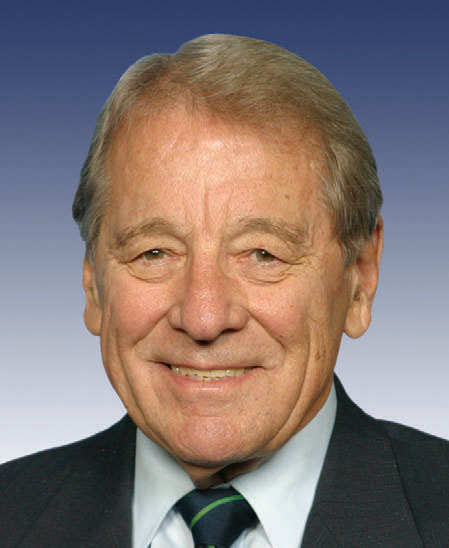

Nominee	Ralph Regula	Jeff Seemann
Party	Republican	Democratic
Popular vote	202,544	101,817
Percentage	66.5%	33.5%
- County results Regula: 60–70% 70–80%
U.S. Representative before election
Ralph Regula
Republican
Elected U.S. Representative
Ralph Regula
Republican

=== Predictions ===
Source	Ranking	As of
The Cook Political Report	Safe R	October 29, 2004
Sabato's Crystal Ball	Safe R	November 1, 2004

=== Results ===
Ohio's 16th Congressional District election, 2004
Party	Candidate	Votes	%
Republican	Ralph Regula (Incumbent)	202,544	66.55
Democratic	Jeff Seemann	101,817	33.45
Total votes		304,361	100
Republican hold			

== District 17 ==
2004 Ohio's 17th congressional district election
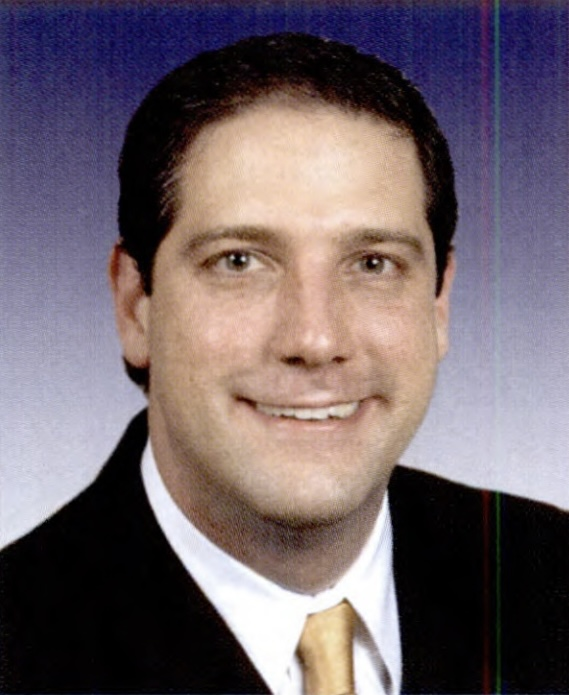

Nominee	Tim Ryan	Frank V. Cusimano
Party	Democratic	Republican
Popular vote	212,800	62,871
Percentage	77.2%	22.8%
- County results Ryan: 70–80% 80–90%
U.S. Representative before election
Tim Ryan
Democratic
Elected U.S. Representative
Tim Ryan
Democratic

=== Predictions ===
Source	Ranking	As of
The Cook Political Report	Safe D	October 29, 2004
Sabato's Crystal Ball	Safe D	November 1, 2004

=== Results ===
Ohio's 17th Congressional District election, 2004
Party	Candidate	Votes	%
Democratic	Tim Ryan (Incumbent)	212,800	77.19
Republican	Frank V. Cusimano	62,871	22.81
Total votes		275,671	100
Democratic hold			

== District 18 ==
2004 Ohio's 18th congressional district election
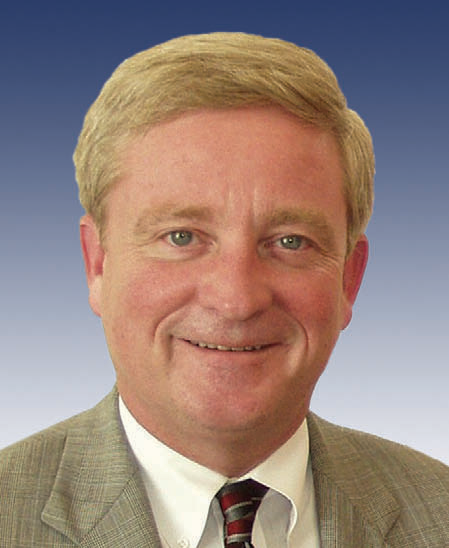

Nominee	Bob Ney	Brian Thomas
Party	Republican	Democratic
Popular vote	177,600	90,820
Percentage	66.2%	33.8%
- County results Ney: 50–60% 60–70% 70–80% Thomas: 60–70%
U.S. Representative before election
Bob Ney
Republican
Elected U.S. Representative
Bob Ney
Republican

=== Predictions ===
Source	Ranking	As of
The Cook Political Report	Safe R	October 29, 2004
Sabato's Crystal Ball	Safe R	November 1, 2004

=== Results ===
Ohio's 18th Congressional District election, 2004
Party	Candidate	Votes	%
Republican	Bob Ney (Incumbent)	177,600	66.16
Democratic	Brian R. Thomas	90,820	33.84
Total votes		268,420	100
Republican hold			
