= Robert T. Secrest =

American politician (1904–1994)

Bob Secrest
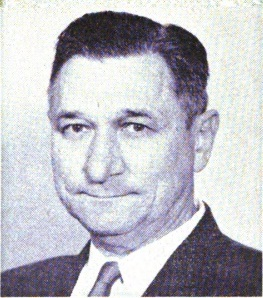

Member of the U.S. House of Representatives from Ohio's 15th district
- In office January 3, 1963 – December 30, 1966
- Preceded by: Tom V. Moorehead
- Succeeded by: Chalmers P. Wylie
- In office January 3, 1949 – September 26, 1954
- Preceded by: Percy W. Griffiths
- Succeeded by: John E. Henderson
- In office March 4, 1933 – August 3, 1942
- Preceded by: C. Ellis Moore
- Succeeded by: Percy W. Griffiths

Member of the Ohio Senate from the 20th district
- In office January 3, 1969 – December 31, 1976
- Preceded by: Tom V. Moorehead
- Succeeded by: Sam Speck

Member of the Ohio House of Representatives
- In office 1931–1932

Personal details
- Born: Robert Thompson Secrest; January 22, 1904 Senecaville, Ohio, U.S.
- Died: May 15, 1994 (aged 90) Cambridge, Ohio, U.S.
- Resting place: Senacaville Cemetery
- Party: Democratic
- Education: Muskingum College; Columbia University; British School of Civil Affairs

Military service
- Allegiance: United States
- Branch/service: United States Navy
- Years of service: 1942 - 1946
- Rank: Commander
- Battles/wars: World War II

Robert Thompson Secrest (January 22, 1904 – May 15, 1994) was an American veteran of World War II, educator, and Democratic representative to the United States Congress from the state of Ohio. He served in Congress three separate times: 1933 to 1942, 1949 to 1954, and 1963 to 1966, resigning each time prior to the end of his term.

== Biography ==
Robert Secrest was born at Senacaville, Guernsey County, Ohio, the eldest son of a miner, Robert Waits Secrest (1880-1929), and his wife Amelia née Thompson. Robert attended the State public schools. He subsequently graduated from Muskingum College in New Concord, Ohio, 1926, Washington, D.C. College of Law, 1938, and Columbia University, New York City, 1943. He graduated from British School of Civil Affairs, Wimbledon, England, 1943.

=== Early career ===
Secrest was superintendent of the Murray City, Ohio, schools 1931–1932. He was a member of the Ohio House of Representatives 1931–1932. He was elected as a Democrat to the 73rd to 77th United States Congresses, and served March 4, 1933, to August 3, 1942, when he resigned to join the United States Navy. He was later promoted to Commander and served until February 28, 1946, in England, Africa, Italy and the Pacific.

=== Political career ===
Secrest ran unsuccessfully for Congress in 1946, and acted as legal supervisor for the Library of Congress from 1946 to 1947. He was elected to the 81st through 83rd Congresses, and served January 3, 1949, to September 26, 1954, when he resigned to become a member of the Federal Trade Commission. He served on that commission 1954–1961, and was Director of Commerce, State of Ohio in 1962.

Secrest again was elected to the 88th and 89th Congresses, and served January 3, 1963, to December 30, 1966, when he again resigned after failing at re-election in 1966. He was a member of the Ohio State Senate from 1969 to 1973, and member of the National Council of the American Legion, 1978 to 1987.

=== Death ===
He died May 15, 1994, in Cambridge, Ohio. At the time of his death, he was the earliest-serving former congressman as well as the last one to have served during the Herbert Hoover administration.

U.S. House of Representatives
Preceded by C. Ellis Moore	Member of the U.S. House of Representatives from Ohio's 15th congressional district 1933–1942	Succeeded by Percy W. Griffiths
Preceded by Percy W. Griffiths	Member of the U.S. House of Representatives from Ohio's 15th congressional district 1949–1954	Succeeded by John E. Henderson
Preceded by Tom V. Moorehead	Member of the U.S. House of Representatives from Ohio's 15th congressional district 1963-1966	Succeeded by Chalmers P. Wylie
Honorary titles
Preceded by Victor Christgau	Most senior living U.S. representative (Sitting or former); October 10, 1991 – May 15, 1994; Served alongside: Jennings Randolph	Succeeded by Jennings Randolph
