= Dave Hobson =

American politician (1936–2024)

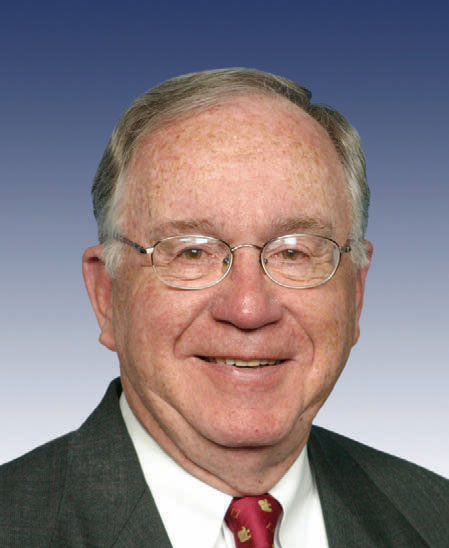
- Official portrait, 2005

Member of the U.S. House of Representatives from Ohio's 7th district
- In office January 3, 1991 – January 3, 2009
- Preceded by: Mike DeWine
- Succeeded by: Steve Austria

Member of the Ohio Senate from the 10th district
- In office December 13, 1982 – January 3, 1991
- Preceded by: Mike DeWine
- Succeeded by: Merle G. Kearns

Personal details
- Born: October 17, 1936 Cincinnati, Ohio, U.S.
- Died: October 6, 2024 (aged 87) Dayton, Ohio, U.S.
- Party: Republican
- Spouse: Carolyn Alexander Hobson
- Education: Ohio Wesleyan University, Ohio State University
- Occupation: Attorney

Military service
- Branch/service: United States Air National Guard
- Years of service: 1958–1963
- Unit: Ohio

David Lee Hobson (October 17, 1936 – October 6, 2024) was an American lawyer and politician of the Republican Party who served as a U.S. representative from the seventh congressional district of Ohio from 1991 to 2009.

== Early life and education ==
Hobson was born in Cincinnati, Ohio, and graduated from Withrow High School in 1954. He received a Bachelor of Arts degree from Ohio Wesleyan University (Delaware, Ohio) in 1958 and a law degree from Ohio State University (Columbus, Ohio) in 1963. He served in the Ohio Air National Guard from 1958 to 1963, and was inducted into the Ohio Veterans Hall of Fame. Hobson served as an Ohio state senator from 1982 to 1990, serving as President of the Ohio Senate from 1988 to 1990 and as a majority whip. Hobson was responsible for Ohio's first AIDS law and grants for treatments for Alzheimer's disease.

== Congress ==
In 1990, after Mike DeWine left his seat in the U.S. House of Representatives to become Lieutenant Governor of Ohio, Hobson was elected to replace him. It was the second time Hobson had succeeded DeWine; he had followed DeWine into the Ohio Senate. Hobson began serving in the House in 1991 (102nd Congress), and was reelected eight times without serious difficulty. Hobson was the assistant majority whip for the 110th Congress. Hobson was a member of the Republican Main Street Partnership and was considered to be a moderate Republican.

As a congressman, some of Hobson's primary concerns were improving health care, controlling government spending and balancing the budget, and strengthening national security. Hobson also believed that Congress needed to help stimulate the economies of former industrial towns which had seen factories leave. He sought to privatize military housing and fund military research at the Wright-Patterson Air Force Base, which was in his district, and helped to establish the Ohio Western Reserve National Cemetery and Glenn Research Center. He also secured funding for a memorial at the Normandy American Cemetery and Memorial for American soldiers killed in World War II.

Hobson served in the House Committee on Appropriations, and became the top Republican on the Military Construction and Energy-Water subcommittees. He opposed several attempts by the administration of George W. Bush to fund a bunker buster.

=== Controversies ===
In October 2006, the Wall Street Journal reported that Hobson led a delegation to Normandy, France in August 2004 for the groundbreaking of an "interpretive center" at a cemetery for American soldiers killed during World War II. During the seven-day trip, the delegation was feted with at least two private restaurant dinners, one given by Northrop Grumman and another by the PMA Group, a leading lobbyist for defense companies. On a 2005 trip to visit nuclear fuel processing plants in France, Hobson and his delegation attended a dinner near Avignon, in southern France, hosted by Areva SA, the world's largest maker of nuclear reactors. Because House rules prohibit members from accepting any gifts worth $50 or more, the article cited the opinions of “experts” on congressional ethics who speculated that the trip may have violated House rules and possibly federal law. However, no legal or ethics charges were brought forward and no impropriety was alleged by either legal or congressional ethics officials.

On October 14, 2007, Hobson announced that he would retire at the end of his term in 2009. After leaving Congress, he became president of the lobbying firm Vorys Advisors LLC.

=== Committee assignments ===
- Appropriations Committee
  - Subcommittee on Defense
  - Subcommittee on Energy and Water Development (Ranking Member)
  - Subcommittee on Military Construction (Chair)

== Death ==
On October 6, 2024, Hobson died at Miami Valley Hospital in Dayton, Ohio, at the age of 87.

== See also ==
- List of United States representatives from Ohio

== Footnotes ==
U.S. House of Representatives
| Preceded by Mike DeWine | Member of the U.S. House of Representatives from Ohio's 7th congressional district 1991–2009 | Succeeded by Steve Austria |
