= List of Jack Abramoff–related organizations =

Jack Abramoff's career brought him into contact with numerous organizations, including lobbying firms, restaurants, think tanks, and charitable organizations.

== 1980s ==
- Brandeis University: Abramoff's alma mater
- Citizens for America: Conservative grassroots organization, related to the Iran-Contra scandal, that Abramoff ran in the 1980s.
- College Republican National Committee: Political organization of which Jack Abramoff was chairman from 1981 to 1985.
- International Freedom Foundation: Think tank founded by Abramoff.

== 1990s - present ==
- Aeneas Enterprises: Consulting firm founded by Jack Abramoff's brother which received payments from GrassRoots Interactive and did business with Tyco International and International Interactive Alliance.
- Alexander Strategy Group: Lobbying firm founded by Ed Buckham involved in the K Street Project that coordinated with Jack Abramoff and employed Tom DeLay's wife, John Doolittle's wife, and Tony Rudy.
- American International Center: Front organization run by Michael Scanlon.
- Americans for Tax Reform: Grover Norquist organization that received donations from Abramoff's clients
- Archives Restaurant: Short-lived kosher restaurant started by Abramoff, incorporated March 18, 2002.
- Atlantic Research Analysis: Michael Scanlon organization, pass-through for Capitol Campaign Strategies.
- Beis Avrohom Chaim: Company founded by Abramoff to run Eshkol Academy and acquire real estate for the school.
- Capital Athletic Foundation: Non-profit organization, incorporated by Abramoff July 8, 1999.
- Capitol Campaign Strategies: Public relations firm run by Michael Scanlon, incorporated January 12, 2001.
- Capitol Media: Grassroots/political consulting firm owned or controlled by Ralph Reed
- Cassidy & Associates: Lobbying firm for which Abramoff worked.
- Century Strategies: A grassroots/political consulting firm owned or controlled by Ralph Reed
- Christian Research Network: A fictitious grassroots organization controlled by Michael Scanlon.
- Concerned Citizens Against Gaming Expansion: A fictitious grassroots organization controlled by Michael Scanlon.
- Council of Republicans for Environmental Advocacy (CREA):an environmental non-profit organization to or through which Abramoff or Scanlon directed their tribal clients to pay money
- Eshkol Academy: Non-profit school founded by Abramoff.
- Federal Program Services: Consulting company founded in 2002 by Sam Hook, an Abramoff associate.
- Global Christian Outreach Network: A fictitious grassroots organization controlled by Michael Scanlon.
- Greenberg Traurig: Lobbying firm that employed Abramoff.
- GrassRoots Interactive: Lobbying firm sold to Abramoff in September 2003.
- KAR LLC: Front organization, run by Team Abramoff lobbyist Kevin A. Ring, which received money by GrassRoots Interactive and Capitol Campaign Strategies
- Kay Gold LLC: Abramoff family company which received millions of dollars from Capitol Campaign Strategies, GrassRoots International, and the American international Center.
- Kollel Ohel Tiferet: Entity used by Abramoff to send money to Shmuel Ben-Zvi, his high-school friend in Israel.
- Lexington Group: a company owned or controlled by Abramoff that performed lobbying-type services
- Liberty Consulting: Front organization run by Lisa Rudy, wife of Tony Rudy, DeLay chief-of-staff and Team Abramoff lobbyist.
- Livsar Enterprises: Front organization used as the official owner of Signatures Restaurant, funded by Capitol Campaign Strategies.
- National Center for Public Policy Research: Conservative think tank, Abramoff was on the board of directors.
- Preston Gates Ellis & Rouvelas Meeds LLP: Lobbying firm that employed Abramoff.
- Scanlon Capitol Management, LLC: Controlled by Scanlon, used to invest money.
- Scanlon Gould Public Affairs: Political consulting firm controlled by Scanlon, secretly paid money to Abramoff.
- Scanlon Venture Capital: Controlled by Scanlon, used to invest money.
- Signatures: Washington, D.C. restaurant started by Abramoff.
- Sports Suites LLC: Firm created by Abramoff to handle billing for use of skyboxes at MCI Center, Camden Yards, and FedEx Field.
- Stacks Delicatessen: New York-style kosher deli started by Abramoff.
- SunCruz Casinos: An off-shore casino purchased by Abramoff, Adam Kidan, and Ben Waldman, then divested after bankruptcy
- Torah School of Greater Washington: K-6 Orthodox Jewish school Abramoff helped found in the 1994.
- Toward Tradition: Non-profit organization directed by Abramoff.
- U.S. Family Network: Charitable organization founded by Ed Buckham that received money from Abramoff's lobbying clients and the NRCC

=== Lobbying clients ===
- List of Jack Abramoff's tribal clients
- eLottery
- Foxcom Wireless: Israeli company that won Capital Hill wireless contract, contributed to Capital Athletic Foundation
- Malaysia
- Tan Holdings Corporation
- Tyco International
- Voor Huisen: Dutch company connected to Russian energy giant Naftasib.
- Chelsea Commercial Enterprises: Bahamian company connected to Naftasib.
