= Todd Boulanger =

American lobbyist

- Occupation: Lobbyist
- Known for: Jack Abramoff scandal

Todd Boulanger is an American lobbyist. He was senior vice president of Cassidy & Associates and was a figure in the Jack Abramoff scandal.

== Early life and education ==
Boulanger graduated from the University of New Hampshire with a degree in political science, and served in the U.S. Army Reserves for eight years.

== Career ==
In 1999, Boulanger followed Jack Abramoff to work for Preston Gates Ellis & Rouvelas Meeds, and then to Greenberg Traurig as a member of "Team Abramoff" in 2001, and finally to Cassidy & Associates in 2004.

In 2000, Boulanger served on the Bush recount team for Broward and Duval counties during the Florida election recount. His Greenberg Traurig online profile heralded his involvement; fellow Team Abramoff members Shawn Vasell, Tony Rudy, and Duane Gibson also participated.

Boulanger was also a legislative aide to Senator Bob Smith.

=== Abramoff scandal ===
While working for Abramoff in 2002, Todd Boulanger drafted a letter to Secretary of the Interior Gale Norton on behalf of the Louisiana Coushatta against the Jena Band of Choctaws from Louisiana, who were hoping to build a casino near the Coushatta's own. His original draft said to Norton: "we hold you accountable" to shoot down "reservation shopping" by the Jenas. In June, Norton received a toned-down letter, signed by House Majority Leader Tom DeLay (R-Tex.), House Speaker J. Dennis Hastert (R-Ill.) and Majority Whip Roy Blunt (R-Mo.).

Billing records and emails indicate Boulanger had 31 instances of lobbying contacts with the White House while at Greenberg. On February 21, 2002, for example, Susan Ralston e-mailed Boulanger in reference to briefing materials opposing the construction of a casino in Louisiana by the Jena Band of the Choctaw: "Thanks for breakfast. I showed KR the binder . . . . He gave the binder to Mehlman to read cover to cover and to be prepared. Mehlman will be at the meeting."

Emails also show that Boulanger was involved with Abramoff, Kevin Ring, Shawn Vasell and Tony Rudy in the Team Abramoff efforts to secure $16.3 million in funding from the Department of Justice for the construction of a jail by the Mississippi Band of the Choctaw. Documents released with Boulanger's guilty plea include emails by Boulanger, Abramoff, and Ring discussing giving "Staffer E"—identified by the Associated Press as Sen. Thad Cochran aide Ann Copland—tickets for ice skating and Paul McCartney and Green Day concerts. The lobbyists believed Copland could assist their client, the Mississippi Choctaw.

Boulanger was identified as "Lobbyist D" in the plea agreement of Trevor Blackann, a former staffer for Rep. Roy Blunt (R-Mo.) and Sen. Kit Bond (R-Mo.) who pleaded guilty on November 20, 2008 to making false statements about thousands of dollars in gifts from Boulanger and fellow lobbyist James Hirni. Boulanger resigned from Cassidy & Associates the following day.

On January 28, 2009, Boulanger was formally charged in the scandal. Boulanger pleaded guilty to bribing government officials the next day. Following the initial wave of the Abramoff scandal, Boulanger became a regular on Fox News and MSNBC, and was named by Politico as one of the "50 Politicos To Watch" for his "nattily attired, outside-the-box staying power."

On January 20, 2021, Boulanger received a full pardon from President Donald Trump during his last hours in office.

== Personal life ==
Boulanger is married to Jessica Incitto, a Republican spokesperson who has worked for Tom DeLay, Roy Blunt and Progress for America.
