= Capitol Campaign Strategies =

American public relations firm

Capitol Campaign Strategies was an American public relations firm run by Michael Scanlon, Tom DeLay's former press secretary, which Scanlon used in coordination with Jack Abramoff to redirect about $40 million in lobbying contributions from Indian tribes to Scanlon, Abramoff, and their associates, as well as funding bribes to Republican politicians such as Bob Ney. Scanlon and Abramoff have pleaded guilty for their activities. After Abramoff left Preston Gates and went to Greenberg Traurig in January 2001, Scanlon formed Capitol Campaign Strategies. Its official location was 611 Pennsylvania Avenue SE in Washington, D.C., which is a maildrop. Scanlon also formed the dummy organizations American International Center and Atlantic Research Analysis a.k.a. Atlantic Research & Analysis, used to receive and distribute CCS money.

Their criminal scheme worked as follows: Abramoff directed his tribal clients to pay CCS for political services without disclosing his ties to Scanlon; the clients were grossly overbilled; Scanlon and Abramoff split the profits fifty-fifty in a scheme known to the two as "Gimme Five". Public relations firms are not under the same disclosure requirements as registered lobbyists such as Abramoff.

== Money in ==
About $53 million in fees from four tribes to Capitol Campaign Strategies, either directly or through other Abramoff-controlled organizations (e.g. a $1 million from the Choctaws for "professional services" to the National Center for Public Policy Research was split $500,000 to CCS and $450,000 to Abramoff's Capital Athletic Foundation, and $50,000 to repay an Abramoff loan).

According to the Senate Indian Affairs Committee, six tribes gave CCS a total of $66 million.

As stipulated in Scanlon's and Abramoff's pleas, CCS received net profits of approximately $39,397,300 from the first four tribes listed below. Of this amount, Scanlon kicked back approximately $19,698,644 to Abramoff.

| Tribe | Moneys received | Kick-back to Abramoff | Time period |
|---|---|---|---|
| Mississippi Choctaws | $14,765,000 | $6,365,000 | June 2001 – April 2004 |
| Coushatta Tribe of Louisiana | $30,510,000 | $10,944,000 | March 2001 – May 2003 |
| Saginaw Chippewa of Michigan | $3,500,000 | $540,000 | June 2002 – October 2003 |
| Tigua Tribe of Texas | $4,200,000 | $1,850,000 | March 2002 |
| Sandia Pueblo of New Mexico | $2,750,000 | $1,175,000 | March 2002 |
| Agua Caliente Band of Cahuilla Indians | ? |

The four tribes hired Scanlon's firm mainly for state-level work, including efforts to prevent other tribes from opening rival casinos.

In 2002 the Coushatta tribe gave CCS $13.7 million. Tribal chairman Lovelin Poncho and council member William G. Worfel of the Coushatta Tribe used CCS to spy on other tribes and fellow Coushattas, approving gigantic invoices with only the description "professional services." The largest single invoice was $3,405,000 on March 13, 2002.

CCS helped put together a "Slate of Eight" for the 2001 tribal council election of the Saginaw Chippewa. Soon after the new council entered office, they paid him $1.8 million. It is a federal offense for individual tribe members to use casino profits for their own benefit.

== Money out ==
- $1.8 million plus $2.3 million from Scanlon's front organization American International Center to Abramoff's college friend Ralph Reed in 2001 and 2002 to assemble anti-gambling coalitions in Louisiana and Texas. Abramoff and Scanlon later took on the Tigua Tribe of Texas whose casinos were blocked by the coalition as clients.
- $500,000 to the Republican Governors Association before the 2002 election (in two contributions of $250,000 each on October 17 and 22). The payment was not disclosed until the association filed amended reports on April 27, 2004. In January 2006 Gov. Mitt Romney said the association would donate $500,000 to American Red Cross chapters in the hurricane areas of Louisiana, Mississippi, Texas, Florida and Alabama.
- $125,000 to Team Abramoff member Kevin Ring (through KAR LLC, based at Ring's home) with monies from the Pueblo of Sandia Tribe of New Mexico in 2002
- $20,000 each to Team Abramoff members John Van Horne and Michael Smith in 2002 (contrary to Greenberg Traurig policy; Horne and Smith were asked to resign in 2005)
- An example of the Abramoff kickback: more than $12 million to Abramoff’s Kay Gold Inc. in 9 months in 2002 [Roll Call, 3/23/04], including a $2,266,250 check on September 12, 2002
- An example of an actual lobbying expense: $50,000 to lobbying firm Lunde & Burger to lobby Senator Dodd
- $120,000 to the Alexander Strategy Group in 2002
- $950,000 via Scanlon's front organization Atlantic Research Analysis to Capital Athletic Foundation in 2003

== Employees ==
A few mostly young people were employed by CCS in a townhouse on Capitol Hill.

== Quotes ==
According to assistant attorney general Alice Fisher:

Scanlon and Abramoff agreed to defraud their tribal clients in a scheme they jokingly referred to between themselves as the "Gimme Five" program.

Let me explain to you how this program worked. As described in the court papers filed today, Abramoff would recommend that his tribal clients hire a company run by Scanlon, Capitol Campaign Strategies, or CCS, to perform grassroots or public relations services on behalf of the tribes.

But the tribes weren't getting the whole picture. Abramoff did not refer tribal clients to CCS solely to further the interest of the tribe. Rather, he did so to further his own interest and to line his own pockets in ways which were fraudulent and illegal.

As they have both now admitted, Abramoff and Scanlon agreed that Scanlon would pay secret kickbacks of 50 percent back to Abramoff each time a tribal client hired CCS. These secret kickbacks ran into the millions of dollars and were never disclosed to the clients.
