= James Hirni =

James F. Hirni is a lobbyist who was convicted of bribing U.S. Senate staff aides in exchange for favorable amendments to legislation. A former aide to U.S. Senator Tim Hutchinson (R-AR), he joined the lobbying firm Sonnenschein, Nath & Rosenthal, and then became a member of "Team Abramoff" at Greenberg Traurig. He went on to become a lobbyist for Wal-Mart from 2004–08, as its executive director of Republican outreach. He was fired when charges were filed concerning his activities with Abramoff.

Court documents filed November 21, 2008, charged Hirni with one count of "conspiracy to commit honest services wire fraud" for giving Republican Trevor Blackann, staffer to Missouri Senator Kit Bond (R) and Republican Fraser Verrusio, a staffer to Alaska Representative Don Young (R) an all-expenses paid trip to the World Series in exchange for favorable amendments to the Federal Highway Bill that benefited Hirni's client, United Rentals.

On December 12, 2008, he pled guilty to conspiring to commit wire fraud. The conspiracy had occurred just a few weeks before Hirni left Sonnenschein to work at Greenberg Traurig with Abramoff.

The United Rental conspiracy investigation also resulted in guilty pleas from Abramoff associates, Todd Boulanger and a Senate aide, Trevor Blackann, who at the time worked for Missouri Republican Senator Kit Bond.

On March 6, 2009, Verrusio was indicted for receiving trip in return for inserting the legislative amendments. Hirni also worked as a lobbyist at Rhoads Group, the National Federation of Independent Business and Sonnenschein, Nath & Rosenthal, and as a legislative assistant to Senator Bill Frist and Senator Jeff Sessions.

In January 2011, it was reported that Hirni was actively working on the campaign of Rick Santorum.
