= Hamilton Square (disambiguation) =

Hamilton Square located in Birkenhead, Wirral, England is a town square surrounded by Georgian terraces

Hamilton Square may also refer to:

- Birkenhead Hamilton Square railway station, an underground railway station located at Hamilton Square in Birkenhead, Wirral, England
- Hamilton Square, New Jersey, a census-designated place (CDP) and unincorporated community located within Hamilton Township, in Mercer County, New Jersey, United States
- Hamilton Square, Pennsylvania is an unincorporated community in Hamilton Township, Monroe County, Pennsylvania, United States
- Hamilton Square Baptist Church protests, a protest that occurred in 1993
