= Todd K. Rosengart =

American cardiothoracic surgeon, educator, and researcher

Todd K. Rosengart (born January 24, 1960) is an American cardiothoracic surgeon, educator, and researcher, currently serving as the Chair of the Michael E. DeBakey Department of Surgery and Vice President for Hospital Operations and Quality Improvements at Baylor College of Medicine (BCM). In addition, he serves as the DeBakey-Bard Chair and professor of heart and vascular disease at the Texas Heart Institute. He has been a leading researcher in cardiac angiogenesis and regeneration and is known for performing the world's first viral-based gene cardiac transfer procedure. and for his contributions to medical education and technology entrepreneurship. Rosengart is recognized for his expertise in procedures such as bypass surgery, valve repair, minimally invasive surgery and heart transplantation

== Early life and education ==
Born in Brooklyn, New York and brother to American lawyer, Mathew S. Rosengart. He completed his M.D. with honors from Northwestern University in 1983 under the mentorship of Dr. Michael Lesch, known for co-discovering the Lesch-Nyhan syndrome. After graduation, he completed an internship and residency in general surgery at New York University Medical Center in 1985, a research fellowship at the National Heart, Lung, and Blood Institute (NIH) in 1987, and a thoracic surgery residency at New York Hospital in 1991. Furthering his training, Rosengart moved to London, UK, to become an honorary senior registrar at The Hospital for Sick Children. He completed his training at The Harley Street Clinic, working with Jaroslav Stark, a pioneer in the use of mathematics to study biological systems.

== Career ==
Prior to joining BCM, Rosengart held several significant positions at the State University of New York at Stony Brook (SUNY-Stony Brook), including professor and chair of the Department of Surgery and Chief of Cardiothoracic Surgery. He also served as the co-director of the Stony Brook Heart Center.

In 2012, Rosengart joined Baylor College of Medicine, taking up multiple institutional roles, serving as the two-term chair of the BCM Faculty Group Practice Board of Governors and a member of the Baylor St. Luke's Medical Center Board of Directors. Additionally, he served as the board chair of Affiliated Medical Services, a consortium of BCM and the University of Texas faculty staffing the Harris Health System.

Throughout his career, Rosengart has made substantial contributions to cardiothoracic surgery and heart and vascular disease education, noted for performing the world's first viral-based cardiac gene transfer procedure. Rosengart has made progress in gene therapy to encourage the heart to grow new blood vessels, potentially offering a long-term cure for heart disease; already, over hundred patients have received the experimental therapy with encouraging results, with recent studies adding objective evidence of its effectiveness. He is co-founder of Vitals.com, now one of the largest medical consumerism companies in the U.S. and XyloCor Therapeutics, a gene therapy company. Moreover, he has secured approximately $20 million in research grants and holds thirteen U.S. patents.

=== Research and publications ===
Rosengart is a respected researcher and NIH-funded scientist and has over 200 published papers credited to him, with more than 1,500 citations and an h-index of 61. He served as the Editor-In-Chief of the Seminar in Thoracic and Cardiovascular Surgery from 2012 to 2020.

=== Patents ===
Rosengart's research has generated 13 patents and applications, including:

- Perfusion and occlusion device and method, (1999).
- Gene transfer therapy delivery device and method, (1998).
- Minimally invasive gene therapy delivery device, (1999).
- Method of expressing an exogenous nucleic acid, (2000).
- Method of inducing angiogenesis, (2001).
- Gene therapy platformed needle and method of administering a therapeutic solution to the heart, (2001).
- Remote sensing gene therapy delivery device and method of administering a therapeutic solution to a heart, (2003).
- Multiple site delivery of adenoviral vector directly into muscle for the induction of angiogenesis, (2003).
- Method and apparatus for performing an anastomosis, (2006).
- Apparatus and method for cutting a heart valve, (2007).
- Method for determining the quality of a professional, (2014).
- Angiogenic conditioning to enhance cardiac cellular reprograming of fibroblasts of the infarcted myocardium, (2022).

=== Memberships ===
He holds memberships in several professional societies, including the Leducq Foundation Scientific Advisory Committee, the American College of Cardiology, the American Association for Thoracic Surgery, the American College of Surgeons Academy of Master Surgeon Educations, and the American Surgical Association. He served as president of the Society of Surgical Chairs (2019) and co-editor of the Seminars in Thoracic and Cardiovascular Surgery (2013-2016). He is the current Society of Surgical Chair liaison member to the American College of Surgeons Surgical Research Committee and the American Association for Thoracic Surgery representative to the American College of Surgeons Board of Governors, for which he is vice chair of its Physician Competency and Health Workgroup.
