= Robert Coughlin =

Robert Coughlin may refer to:

- Robert J. Coughlin (born 1961), American entrepreneur
- Robert E. Coughlin, American lawyer
- Robert K. Coughlin (born 1969), Massachusetts politician
- Robert Lawrence Coughlin (1929–2001), American lawyer and politician
