= IGPA =

IGPA may refer to:

- The Internet Gambling Prohibition Act, a 1999 bill in the US Senate to ban Internet gambling.
- Indice Global de Precios de Acciones a Chilean stock index.
