= Robert H. Traurig =

American lawyer and businessman (1925–2018)

- Born: June 9, 1925; Waterbury, Connecticut, U.S.
- Died: July 17, 2018 (aged 93); Miami, Florida, U.S.
- Education: University of Miami
- Known for: Founder of Greenberg Traurig

Robert H. Traurig (June 9, 1925 – July 17, 2018) was an American lawyer and businessman who was one of three founders of the Greenberg Traurig, a law and lobbying firm in 1967. The firm grew throughout the late 20th and early 21st centuries to become one of the largest law firms in the United States. He was considered to be the “Father of Miami Land Use Law” and the “Dean of Zoning”.

== Early life and education ==
Traurig was born in 1925, in Waterbury, Connecticut. In 1939, his family relocated to Miami due to the Great Depression. After high school, Taurig enlisted in the United States Navy from 1943 until 1946, serving as a Navy Communications Operator. He later served during the Korean War from 1951 until 1952.

He received a bachelor's degree in business administration from the University of Miami and a Juris Doctor from the University of Miami School of Law. At the University of Miami, he was inducted into the Iron Arrow Honor Society, the highest award bestowed by the university.

== Career ==
After a short period with a local Miami law firm, Traurig opened his own practice in 1954. For the next 13 years he worked largely in real estate, acting for small builders and mortgage companies alongside corporate and business matters.

In 1967, Traurig co-founded the Miami-based law and lobbying firm Greenberg Traurig together with Mel Greenberg and Larry J. Hoffman. The firm, originally named Greenberg Traurig Hoffman, was built around three separate specialisms held by its founders: tax, real estate and corporate law. By 2023, the firm employed more than 2,650 lawyers across 47 offices in the United States, Europe and Asia.

Traurig was a member of the Non-Group, a civically influential group of Miami-Dade business elites.

Traurig's own practice centered on land use and zoning, and came to take in a large number of developers and builders; he also worked on administrative law and government relations. According to the University of Miami School of Law, he was involved in nearly every significant land-use case in Miami and shaped the development of the city's downtown and its suburbs, as well as the westward expansion toward the Everglades. He also carried out pro bono work for churches, schools, cultural institutions and social service organizations.

== Recognition ==
Notable Honors and Awards that Traurig has received included Super Lawyers, The Legal 500 United States, Best Lawyers in America, and Chambers & Partners USA Guide. In 2001, Miami Business Magazine recognized Traurig as one of the “100 Most Powerful People in Miami”. In 2004, Florida Trend Magazine recognized Traurig as one of “Florida’s Influential”. The University of Miami School of Law Alumni Association named Traurig its Alumnus of Distinction in 2011, and in 2012 a gift from Greenberg Traurig renamed the school's LL.M. program in real property development after him. In 2015, Traurig received the Lifetime Achievement Award from The Daily Business Review.

In 2017, the Miami-Dade Beacon Council presented Traurig with its Jay Malina Award for his contributions to Miami's business community.
