= Trevor Blackann =

American lobbyist

Trevor Blackann is an American former lobbyist who pleaded guilty in the Jack Abramoff scandal. He began his political career as a staffer for Missouri Republican Roy Blunt.

As a staffer for U.S. Senator Kit Bond (R-MO), he met with Abramoff and other lobbyists in the Mariana Islands in November 2000. Abramoff charged the islands for this meeting. After leaving Bond to work as a lobbyist, Blackann went on a trip in Todd Boulanger's boat in the Chesapeake Bay.

On November 20, 2008, Blackann pleaded guilty to lying on his 2003 tax returns by concealing $4,100 in gifts from lobbyists. The lobbyists, identified as Lobbyist D and Lobbyist E in the plea agreement, are Team Abramoff associates Todd Boulanger and James Hirni. The gifts included a free trip to Game 1 of the 2003 World Series, which included airline travel to and from New York City, transportation around the city in a chauffeured sport utility vehicle, a ticket to the game, a souvenir baseball jersey, admission to and entertainment at a gentlemen's club following the game and free meals and drinks.

== Family ==
Blackann's wife is Laura Brookshire, a former staffer for Tom DeLay.
