= Kevin A. Ring =

American lawyer

Kevin A. Ring (born October 19, 1970) is a former American attorney and congressional staffer; he served Republicans in both the House and the Senate, including U.S. Representative John T. Doolittle (R-CA). He also served as a counsel on the Senate Judiciary Committee's Constitution, Federalism and Property Rights Subcommittee.

In 2000 Ring started work as a lobbyist with Jack Abramoff, particularly to support Native American tribes trying to develop and gain approval for gaming casinos. Ring and Abramoff were each indicted in the Abramoff Indian lobbying and bribing scandal.

He went to trial on September 1, 2009, resulting in a hung jury.

In a second trial beginning October 18, 2010, Ring was convicted of charges of corruption and honest services wire fraud; he was sentenced in October 2011 to 20 months in prison. He lost his appeal in January 2013, and the US Supreme Court denied certiorari in October 2013 to hear his case. He also faces trial on charges of obstructing congressional and criminal investigators.

== Life and career ==
Ring has a B.A. in political science from Syracuse University and graduated from the Columbus School of Law at Catholic University of America in Washington, D.C. He entered private practice as a member of the Maryland Bar after having worked as a staffer in both the House of Representatives and Senate. In 1993, he joined the staff of U.S. Representative John T. Doolittle. In 1995, he was promoted to legislative director.

In 1998, he was named by then-U.S. Senator John Ashcroft (R-Mo) to serve as a counsel on the Senate Judiciary Committee's Constitution, Federalism and Property Rights Subcommittee. Among other duties, he advised Ashcroft on federal judicial nominations. In 1999 he returned to the House to become executive director of the Conservative Action Team, a group of conservative House Republicans.

In 2000, Ring went to work for Jack Abramoff at Preston Gates Ellis & Rouvelas Meeds LLP, the lobbying arm of the law firm Preston Gates & Ellis LLP, based in Seattle. A year later, he followed Abramoff to Florida-based law firm Greenberg Traurig, where he worked until October 2004. In 2002 and 2003, he was named a "Top Rainmaker" by The Hill newspaper in its annual rankings of Washington's premier lobbyists. In 2004, his book, Scalia Dissents: Writings of the Supreme Court's Wittiest, Most Outspoken Justice, was published.

After leaving Team Abramoff at Greenberg Traurig, he joined Barnes & Thornburg LLP law firm in Washington, D.C. Many of his clients followed him there even as he was identified in several congressional investigations of Abramoff. He resigned from Barnes and Thornburg on April 13, 2007, the same day the FBI raided John Doolittle's home.

In 2015, Ring joined Families Against Mandatory Minimums and became their president from 2017 to 2023. Starting in July 2023, Ring will be the Vice President of Criminal Justice Advocacy at Arnold Ventures LLC.

== Abramoff scandal ==
In 2005, Ring was subpoenaed to appear before the Senate Indian Affairs Committee as part of its Abramoff probe. Asked to discuss his work with Abramoff on behalf of several federally recognized tribes seeking to establish gaming, Ring asserted his Fifth Amendment right against self incrimination. He said, "I'm sorry the clients for whom I worked have had to endure the enormous emotional and financial burden", though he was still working for said clients, the Mississippi Band of Choctaw and the Mashpee Wampanoag Tribe as their paid Washington lobbyist.

Ring has two daughters and is separated from his wife, who asked for a divorce after the Abramoff scandal unfolded. Although he has never spoken publicly about the charges and did not testify at his trial, he touched on the scandal in an essay written for an online fatherhood magazine.

=== Arrest and trials ===
On September 8, 2008, Ring was arrested "on conspiracy, fraud and obstruction-of-justice charges in connection with his alleged role in a four-year scheme to lavish tickets and trips on lawmakers and government officials in return for help for his clients". The indictment also charged him with obstruction of justice, "including false statements about his knowledge of Abramoff's financial relationship with lobbyist Michael Scanlon; his own receipt of a $135,000 referral fee; and his knowledge of how Abramoff obtained a job for the wife of Representative 5". While not named in the indictment, "Representative 5", thought to be Congressman John Doolittle, allegedly took a series of official actions that benefited Ring and Abramoff's lobbying clients. In return, Doolittle and his aides received numerous free meals, tickets to concerts and sporting events, campaign contributions and a part-time job for Doolittle's wife, Julie, who owned a consulting firm, that netted her $96,000. Ring was said to have been an intermediary in the hiring of Julie Doolittle's consulting firm by Abramoff and his firm, Greenberg Traurig, to do fundraising for a charity he founded. Neither Doolittle nor his wife were charged to date.

During this time Ring still represented the Mashpee Wampanoag of Massachusetts, who came to his defense. In 2007 Mashpee Wampanoag Tribal Chairman Glenn Marshall told reporters, "Kevin (Ring) is a good man. He's an honest guy who's done everything for the tribe above-board." Marshall was subsequently convicted on five felony counts associated with the tribe's casino lobbying, including more than 50 illegal campaign contributions facilitated by Abramoff and Ring. The Mashpee Band remained supportive of Ring even after Marshall's arrest, with new Tribal Council Chair Shawn Hendricks affirming the former chair's endorsements and keeping Ring on the Wampanoag payroll through 2008.

Prosecutors relied on e-mail messages associated with work on behalf of the Mashpee Wampanoag to show that Ring provided tickets to sporting events and pricey meals to Robert E. Coughlin, the former Deputy Chief of Staff, Criminal Division, of the United States Department of Justice. He pleaded guilty in April 2008, saying he had accepted meals, concert tickets and luxury seats at Redskins and Wizards games from Ring. In return Coughlin helped secure a $16.3 million grant for the Mississippi Band of Choctaw Indians, whom Ring and Abramoff represented. Coughlin also helped students attending a school run by Abramoff quickly clear immigration hurdles. Court documents also asserted that Ring had provided gifts for Ann Copland, who was senior staff for Republican senator Thad Cochran. E-mails from Ring were subsequently part of the documents submitted when Copland pleaded guilty in March 2009.

==== First trial ====
On September 5, 2008, a federal grand jury had indicted Ring for conspiracy (Count I), payment of an illegal gratuity (Count II), and honest services wire fraud (Counts III, IV, V, VI, VII, and VIII). Before the trial, Ring had been meeting with investigators extensively. Apparently negotiations had broken down and Ring would not accept the proffered plea deal.

The jury trial began on September 1, 2009, and resulted in a hung jury on all counts. On October 15, 2009, U.S. District Court Judge Ellen Segal Huvelle declared a mistrial.

According to TPMmuckraker, a former prosecutor with the Justice Department's Public Integrity unit, called the case against Ring "'an extremely problematic prosecution', since the favors that Ring was accused of doing for public officials weren't in themselves illegal".

In the interval between the first trial and the start of the second trial, the US Supreme Court issued a ruling on the Honest Services Theft issue (Skilling vs. U.S., June 24, 2010), calling the original law too vague. Its ruling limited the government's application of a 1988 "honest services fraud" statute used in Ring's first trial, ruling that it applies only to bribes and kickbacks for specific acts. Before, prosecutors could target patterns of corruption and influence-peddling without proving an explicit quid pro quo. Legal analysts predicted the retrial of Ring would serve as a barometer of the effectiveness of tools available to prosecutors to combat corruption among congressional and executive branch officials.

==== Second trial ====
Ring's second trial began on October 18, 2010. Following the two-week trial, the jury couldn't reach a verdict and sent a note to Judge Huvelle, asking her to explain the difference between legal and illegal gifts. After four days of deliberations, the jury returned a verdict of guilty on five counts on November 15, 2010. Ring was found "guilty on one count of conspiring to corrupt congressional and executive branch officials by providing things of value to them and their staffs to induce or reward those who took official actions benefiting Ring and his clients. In addition, [he] was convicted of one count of paying a gratuity to a public official and three counts of honest-services wire fraud for engaging in a scheme to deprive U.S. citizens of their right to the honest services of certain public officials. The jury acquitted [him] on three counts of honest-services fraud". According to testimony, "Ring sought to further his clients' interests by lobbying public officials in the legislative and executive branches of the federal government,... identified public officials who would assist them and their clients, and then groomed them by providing things of value with the intent of making them more receptive to requests on behalf of their clients in the future. The things of value ... included all-expenses-paid travel, meals, drinks, golf outings, as well as tickets to professional sporting events, concerts and other events, and an employment opportunity for the wife of a congressman – which were often billed to Ring's and Jack Abramoff's clients... Ring's corrupt actions resulted in his clients receiving, among other actions, $14 million in congressional transportation appropriations and an additional $7 million from the Justice Department to build a jail."

Ring's attorney said Ring had only been doing his job of influencing public officials. He did not know of specific illegal acts and was not responsible for the capital's lobbying culture, stating: "The way our government works and the role lobbyists play in our government are not on trial, Kevin Ring is on trial".

The Justice Department asked for a sentence of 17 to 22 years. "One reason for the astronomical sentence, according to the government: Mr. Ring was the only lobbyist who went to trial instead of pleading guilty and cooperating with the United States." The government backed off this assessment ... after a rebuke from Judge Huvelle" who wrote: "Defendant's position is that the government is retaliating against him for exercising his Sixth Amendment right to trial", adding "It is easy to see why such an inference might be justified". Ring was asking for five years' probation.

On October 26, 2011, Ring was sentenced by Judge Huvelle to 20 months in prison and to 30 months of supervised release following his prison term. Two more charges are still pending, and may result in a third trial if there is no plea bargaining. He is free on bail while he appeals his conviction, having "shown by clear and convincing evidence that he is not likely to flee or pose a danger to the community".

Ring appealed his conviction, but it was upheld by the U.S. Court of Appeals for the District of Columbia Circuit on January 25, 2013. He appealed that decision to the United States Supreme Court, which denied certiorari on October 7, 2013.
