= Robert E. Coughlin =

American lawyer and former government official

Robert E. Coughlin II is an American lawyer and former government official who served as the Deputy Chief of Staff, Criminal Division, of the United States Department of Justice and was a senior figure in the Jack Abramoff Probe.

== U.S. Department of Justice ==
=== Legislative Affairs ===
In March 2001, Coughlin was hired at DOJ as a Special Assistant to the Assistant Attorney General for Legislative Affairs, John D. Ashcroft. Then in May 2002, Coughlin was promoted to Deputy Director of the Office of Intergovernmental and Public Liaison (OIPL) until June 2003.

=== Deputy Chief of Staff, Criminal Division ===
In June 2005 Coughlin became Deputy Chief of Staff, Criminal Division for the U.S. Department of Justice and in 2006 received the “Attorney General’s Award for Fraud Prevention” by then Attorney General Alberto R. Gonzales for his work investigating and prosecuting fraud cases after Hurricane Katrina and Hurricane Rita.

Coughlin resigned from the Department of Justice in April 2007.

== Abramoff probe ==
December 2020 pardon granted by Donald Trump

A media report linked Coughlin's 2007 resignation to his connection with longtime friend, Kevin A. Ring, who had known each other since 1992 and had worked together as aides to Senator John D. Ashcroft; has been linked in media reports to the Jack Abramoff Indian lobbying scandal. Although Coughlin didn't have substantive contacts with Jack Abramoff, Coughlin's position as Deputy Chief of Staff for the U.S. Department of Justice's Criminal Division placed him high in the chain of supervision, over the unit that was primarily responsible for the wide-ranging probe of Abramoff.

Coughlin accepted a plea bargain on April 22, 2008, pleading guilty to conflict of interest. According to his plea, from March 2001 to October 2003, Coughlin received "things of value" worth $4,800 to $6,180 from Kevin Ring who took Coughlin out for 25 meals (mostly at Abramoff's restaurant Signatures), to seven Washington Wizards and Washington Redskins games (a total of twenty tickets and access to Abramoff's skyboxes), to three concerts (a total of five tickets) and one round of golf while helping Kevin A. Ring and his clients set up meetings with “friendly” DOJ officials.

During this period Ring and Abramoff got a $16.3 million grant from the Justice Department to build a jail for Abramoff's client, the Mississippi Band of Choctaw Indians, even though the tribe was wealthy and some officials thought the money could be "better spent elsewhere." In November 2009, Ellen Segal Huvelle of Washington federal district court sentenced Coughlin to three years of supervised release and ordered him to pay a $2,000 fine. Coughlin was disbarred, but in July 2016 was reinstated to the Bar of the District of Columbia. President Donald Trump pardoned Coughlin (and 25 other individuals convicted of other crimes) on December 24, 2020.
