= Kaygold =

Kaygold LLC (aka KayGold) was Jack Abramoff's primary front organization for funneling tribal moneys in the Gimme Five scheme to his personal accounts. Its registered address was Abramoff's home address; on the National Center for Public Policy Research's 2003 Tax Form 990, Kaygold's address was listed as his work address at Greenberg Traurig.

In only nine months of 2002, more than $12 million was transferred from Michael Scanlon's Capitol Campaign Strategies to Kaygold, including a $2,266,250 check on September 12, 2002 [Roll Call, 3/23/04].

The National Center for Public Policy Research funneled $1.275 million from the International Interactive Alliance received through Abramoff's lobbying firm Greenberg Traurig in 2003 to Kaygold.

Through Kaygold and Livsar, another of Abramoff's dummy corporations, Abramoff contributed $2,000 to David Catania's campaign.
