= Mathew Rosengart =

American lawyer

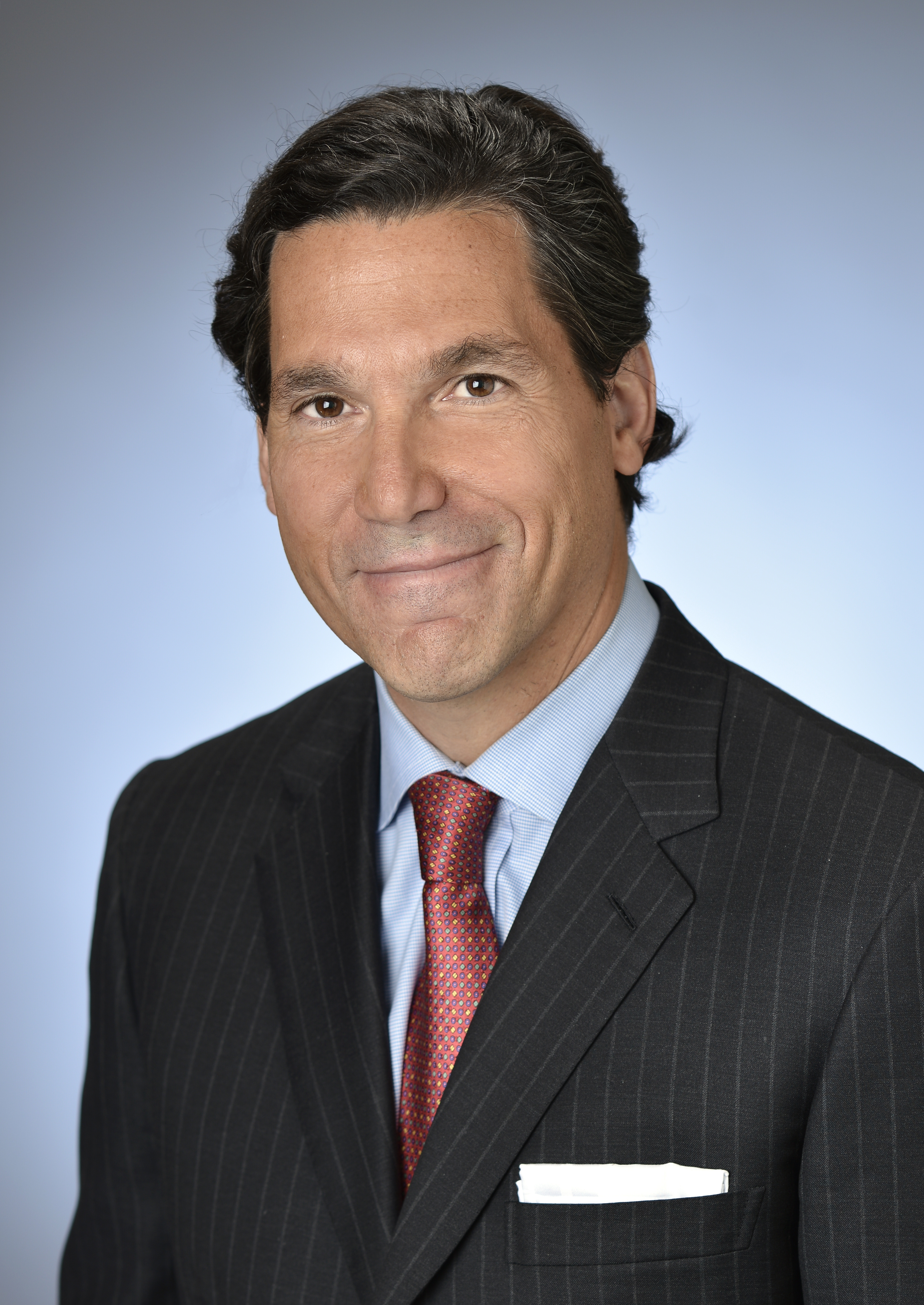
- Rosengart in 2014
- Education: Boston College Law School
- Occupation: Lawyer
- Employer: Greenberg Traurig, LLP

Mathew S. Rosengart is an American lawyer. He is a former federal prosecutor and Trial Attorney for the United States Department of Justice. Considered a "go-to" litigator for Hollywood's elite and corporate America, Rosengart is known for representing high-profile clients, including Steven Spielberg, Sean Penn, Julia Louis-Dreyfus, Kenneth Lonergan, Eddie Vedder, Jimmy Butler, Sandton Capital Partners, Verizon, and Facebook. In July 2021, Rosengart was hired to represent Britney Spears in her fight to remove her father, Jamie Spears, from her conservatorship and to end her years-long battle with her father. Rosengart and Spears won the case on November 12, 2021.

== Education and early career ==
Mathew Rosengart earned his undergraduate degree from Tulane University and his J.D. degree from Boston College Law School (graduating cum laude, in 1987). After graduation, Rosengart served as a law clerk in the New Hampshire Supreme Court for Justice David Souter. He later served as a supervisory assistant United States attorney and Trial Attorney for the U.S. Department of Justice, where he earned the Justice Department's Special Achievement Award.

== Career ==
=== Department of Justice ===
As an Assistant U.S. Attorney, Mathew Rosengart prosecuted the case of Ralph Gene Johnson, who stalked and attempted to kidnap Gay Culverhouse, former president of the Tampa Bay Buccaneers and daughter of the former owner of the Buccaneers, Hugh Culverhouse. Johnson also attempted to kidnap Gay's 20-year-old daughter in a ransom attempt. Following Rosengart's arguments, Johnson was convicted and sentenced to 27 years.

Also, in his capacity as an Assistant U.S. Attorney, Rosengart secured trial convictions in the cases of United States v. Mark Dale Viscome and United States v. Samuel Gentile. Samuel Gentile of Clearwater, Florida, was sentenced to more than 46 years for attempting to kill his estranged wife with a pipe bomb. Mark Viscome, an accomplice, was sentenced to more than 20 years.

In 2000, Rosengart worked as a Trial Attorney for the Justice Department's Campaign Financing Task Force under the direction of Attorney General Janet Reno. Rosengart worked on the case United States v. James Riady, which charged Riady, an Indonesian billionaire, with conspiracy to defraud the U.S. for having made illegal campaign contributions. Rosengart conducted a money laundering investigation and obtained a felony conviction against Riady, and secured an $8.6 million fine—the largest campaign finance fine at that time. The head of the Campaign Financing Task Force was now U.S. District Judge Robert J. Conrad, who said: "Matt Rosengart is one of the sharpest lawyers I've ever met at the Department of Justice" whose "judgment is impeccable."

After being appointed Senior Associate Independent Counsel in a case commenced at the request of then U.S. Attorney General Janet Reno, Rosengart represented the U.S. in the case United States of America, Appellee, v. Henry G. Cisneros, Appellant in 1999. Cisneros, the former Secretary of Housing and Urban Development, had been accused of lying to the FBI. Rosengart helped secure Cisneros’ conviction, and won the appeal on behalf of the U.S. government.

=== Private practice ===
In 2001, Rosengart departed from his role as a government prosecutor and went into private practice. His primary practice areas are media and entertainment litigation, commercial litigation, and white collar defense. In 2011, he joined the law firm, Greenberg Traurig.

Rosengart has worked on numerous high-profile cases, including those involving Britney Spears, Sean Penn, Winona Ryder, Julia Louis-Dreyfus, Keanu Reeves, Daymond John, and Steven Spielberg. He has a "long history of getting results for his big name clients."

==== D/F Management v. Julianna Margulies ====
D/F Management hired Mathew Rosengart to represent the management company in its dispute versus Julianna Margulies, star of The Good Wife. D/F Management had signed Margulies to a contract in 2009. Margulies broke ties with the agency in 2011. Rosengart was hired to file a lawsuit against Margulies seeking damages for unpaid commissions totaling at least $420,000. Rosengart asserted that Margulies's counterclaims against his client were filed in bad faith. In August 2013, Rosengart negotiated a settlement between the two parties. The terms were not disclosed. In an interview, Rosengart said of the case: "All actors, especially experienced actors, understand the obligation to pay their managers post-termination commissions. That is the standard. It is routine. It is universal."

==== Fox Searchlight v. Gary Gilbert; Gary Gilbert v. Kenneth Lonergan ====
Mathew Rosengart successfully defended Kenneth Lonergan, an Oscar-winning writer, and director, from a lawsuit filed by Gary Gilbert. Gilbert was the producer of Lonergan's critically acclaimed film, Margaret, starring Matt Damon, Mark Ruffalo, and Anna Paquin. Gilbert filed a lawsuit after a post-production dispute. Of Margaret and Lonergan, Rosengart said, "The movie was dumped... Having gone through it, and him really believing it was his masterpiece, and having it be doomed, was devastating."

After Lonergan hired Rosengart as his legal counsel, Gilbert filed for dismissal of the lawsuit after it was clear that Damon, Ruffalo, Martin Scorsese, and other Hollywood notables were prepared to testify on behalf of Lonergan. Lonergan attributed the outcome of the case to Rosengart, saying in an interview, "After five years of expensive and highly contentious litigation, the plaintiff suddenly dropped all of his claims in the middle of the trial, without any guarantee of ever receiving a dime."

==== Sean Penn v. Lee Daniels ====
In September 2015, actor Sean Penn hired Mathew Rosengart to represent him in a dispute with Lee Daniels, a movie director who had implied in an interview with The Hollywood Reporter that Penn had physically abused his first wife, Madonna. Rosengart filed a defamation lawsuit against Daniels on Penn's behalf. Rosengart obtained and filed in New York Supreme Court an Affidavit from Madonna confirming that Penn had never physically assaulted her. Rosengart negotiated a settlement on Penn's behalf, which involved the actor dropping the lawsuit in exchange for a retraction, an apology, and a charitable donation from Daniels. In a statement to The New York Times, Penn said: "There's no litigator I'd rather have in my corner." Rosengart is "a tough as nails streetfighter with a big brain and bigger principles."

==== Raven Capital Management v. Green-Light International Films ====
Rosengart represented Raven Capital Management an asset-based opportunity fund in their dispute with Green-Light International Films. Raven had provided loans totaling approximately $9 million to Green-Light for the production of two films. Green-Light was accused of using the money illicitly for expenses such as vacation and salaries. The case went to arbitration. The arbitrator, Jeffrey G. Benz, faulted Green-Light principals for lying under oath, failing to produce bank statements, and violating a distribution agreement. Green-Light was ordered to pay damages of $765,000 plus $1 million in attorneys’ fees and sanctions.

==== Sandton Capital v. Gold Circle Films ====
Sandton Capital Partners, a hedge fund, hired Mathew Rosengart to defend a lawsuit against Gold Circle Films. The film production company had taken out roughly $76 million in loans from CIT Bank. CIT Bank then sold the loans to Sandton. Rosengart represented Sandton and asserted counterclaims after Gold Circle sued Sandton. The lawsuit was resolved in 2019 after a trial when New York Supreme Court Judge Barry Ostrager ordered Gold Circle Films to repay the balance of the loans, which equaled $14 million.

==== ISE v. Jimmy Butler ====
Jimmy Butler, the Miami Heat All-Star guard, hired Mathew Rosengart as his legal counsel after his former sports management group, Independent Sports & Entertainment LLC (ISE), sued Butler for breach of contract in 2020. The lawsuit requested roughly $1 million of Butler's earnings from his Nike endorsement contract, worth $5 million. Rosengart developed a new legal strategy involving counterclaims that Butler was an “artist” under California law, which would have required ISE to have a special license issued by the California Labor Commissioner. ISE lacked the necessary license and opted to drop the litigation.

==== State of California et al. v. Cellco Partnership DBA Verizon Wireless et al. ====
Between 2014 and 2021, Rosengart served as lead counsel for Verizon in a False Claims Act lawsuit involving claims that Verizon, AT&T, Sprint, and T-Mobile overcharged government customers. California government entities alleged that the telecommunications carriers failed to meet contractual obligations concerning affordable cellphone plans. The plaintiffs demanded more than $1.5 billion from the defendants. The parties negotiated a settlement that allowed Verizon to pay $68 million instead. Combined, the telecommunications companies settled for a total of $116 million.

==== Britney Spears ====
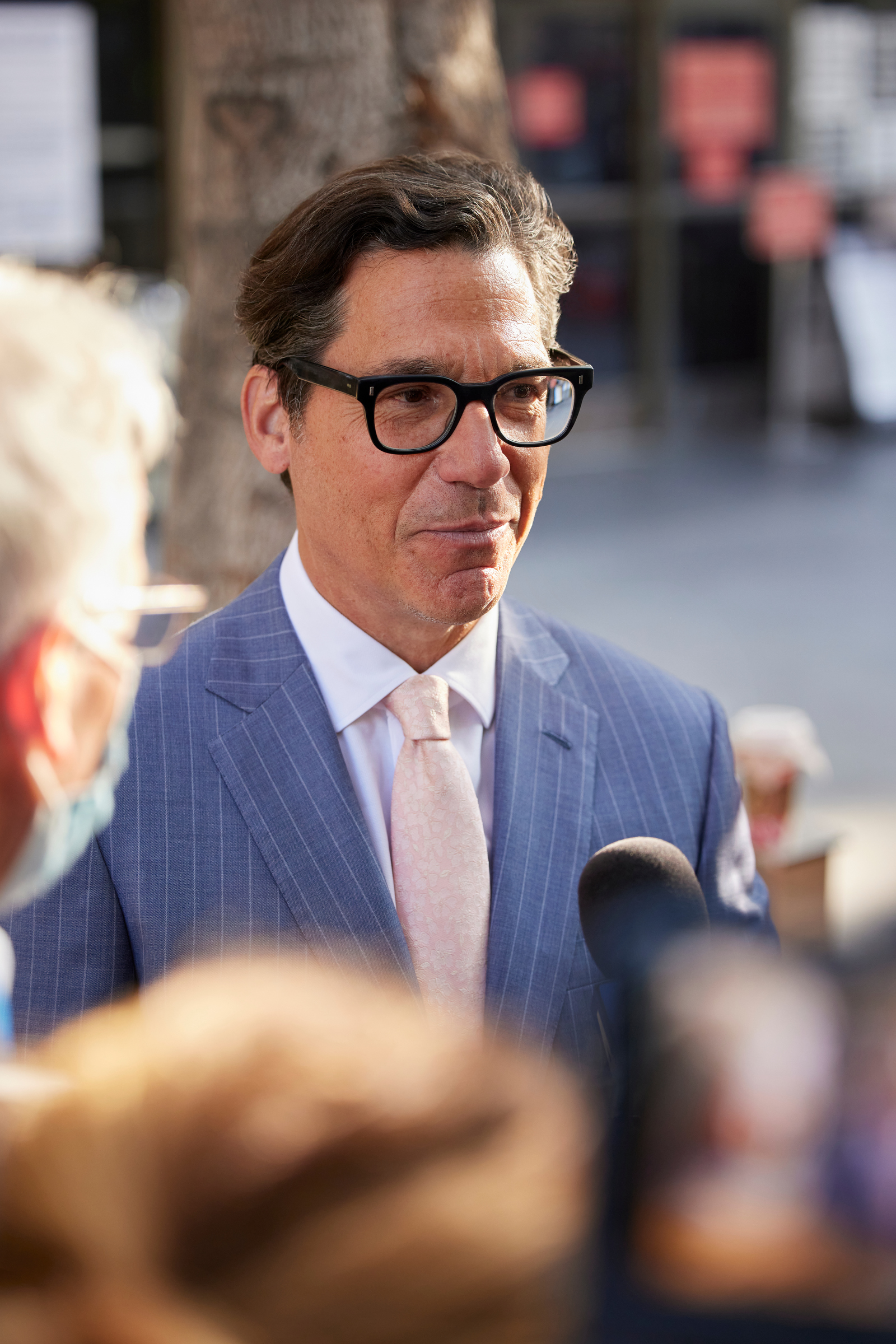
Mathew Rosengart speaking after hearing regarding Britney Spears' conservatorship.

On July 14, 2021, singer Britney Spears hired Rosengart to represent her interests in her conservatorship dispute. Rosengart was hired after Judge Brenda J. Penny ruled that Spears could hire her own legal counsel to replace the court-appointed lawyer, Samuel D. Ingham III, who resigned earlier that month. It was noted that the hiring of Rosengart signaled a more "aggressive" approach to the case.

On July 26, 2021, Rosengart filed a petition with the Los Angeles Superior Court requesting that Spears's father, Jamie Spears, be suspended or removed from his position as conservator of her estate. Rosengart's petition alleged Jamie had committed multiple acts of mismanagement and that his suspension or removal was in the best interests of Spears.

The petition came on the heels of Spears's accusations against her father on June 23, 2021, alleging that Jamie has been abusing his authority and taking financial advantage of her. On February 1, 2008, Spears was involuntarily admitted for mental health treatment by her then-estranged father. Jamie was named her co-conservator the same day. The conservatorship grants Jamie control over his daughter's fortune of nearly $60 million.

On August 5, 2021, Rosengart filed a petition requesting the court to reschedule the next hearing from September 29 to August 23 or immediately suspend the Jamie's position as co-conservator. The request was denied without prejudice by Judge Brenda J. Penny.

On August 12, 2021, in response to Rosengart's petition, Jamie filed paperwork with the Los Angeles Superior Court to remove himself as conservator. Spears conservatorship will temporarily remain with her father until the transition to a new financial conservator is completed.

Rosengart expressed his approval for Jamie's decision to step down but indicated that he may still face legal repercussions for profiting from Spears's estate. Rosengart stated, "We are pleased that Mr. Spears and his lawyer have today conceded in a filing that he must be removed. It is vindication for Britney. We are disappointed, however, by their ongoing shameful and reprehensible attacks on Ms. Spears and others." Rosengart went on to note that the investigation into allegations of Jamie's financial mismanagement would continue and that he would likely be deposed by Rosengart. Rosengart asserted that Jamie had "profited handsomely" from his daughter's estate, paying himself a percentage of her earnings.

On September 22, 2021, Rosengart filed a supplemental petition calling for the immediate resignation of Mr. Spears as the conservator of the estate, stating "While the entire conservatorship is promptly wound down and formally terminated, it is clear that Mr. Spears cannot be permitted to hold a position of control over his daughter for another day.” Rosengart also requested a hearing on the continued mismanagement of Spears's estate by her father and the outstanding accounting and financial issues surrounding the conservatorship, citing “unwarranted commissions from his daughter’s work, totaling millions of dollars.”

On September 29, 2021, Judge Brenda Penny granted Rosengart's petition to suspend Jamie Spears immediately from his position as his daughter's conservator. Rosengart called the ruling, "a substantial step towards her freedom" and stated, "We achieved exactly what we sought out to achieve and that's justice." Rosengart asked the judge for an orderly transition and ultimately a termination of the conservatorship entirely. In a press conference following the decision Rosengart said, "There is definitely something to celebrate, but today is a solemn day. Britney Spears has been faced with a decade long nightmare, a Kafkaesque nightmare, orchestrated by her father and others and she's so thankful to all of you."

On November 12, 2021, Judge Brenda Penny agreed with Rosengart's arguments and terminated the conservatorship. In a press briefing after the hearing, Rosengart stated, "What's next for Britney — and this is the first time this could be said for about a decade — is up to one person: Britney." When asked if Britney would perform again, he stated, “it’s up to her.”

In 2023, Rosengart was noted as a "Key Figure" in Spears' book deal with Simon & Schuster reportedly valued around $15 Million. The Woman in Me became a New York Times #1 Bestseller. In her memoir, Spears credited Rosengart for suspending her father as conservator, leading to the end of the conservatorship.

On June 24, 2024 it was announced that Rosengart was parting ways with Spears after concluding the outstanding litigation on her behalf.

==== Facebook ====
In October 2021, Facebook hired Rosengart to represent the company.

== Awards and honors ==
Rosengart has been featured on The Hollywood Reporter’s Power Lawyer list of the top 100 Hollywood attorneys from 2014-2017 and 2021-2023. In 2021, Rosengart received the National Law Journal’s Sports, Gaming & Entertainment Law Trailblazer Award, he also received litigator of the week from The American Lawyer. In April 2022, Rosengart was presented with Variety's Power of Law award by his client Sean Penn. In September 2022, he was honored with the Excellence in Advocacy Award by the Beverly Hills Bar Association, and Law360 recognized him as Media & Entertainment MVP. Rosengart was given the Praeses Elit Award by Trinity College of Dublin’s Law Society in 2022, other award recipients include Bob Geldof, F.W. de Klerk and Niall Horan. From 2021-2023, Rosengart was named a Leader of Influence by the LA Business Journal. Rosengart ranks among the top litigators in the U.S., having been recognized by The Best Lawyers in America in 2023 and 2024 for his work in Criminal Defense: White-Collar. In 2024, Rosengart was listed as one of the Top 200 Lawyers in America by Forbes and named in Variety's Legal Impact Report for Hollywood's Top Entertainment Attorneys.

== Professional and community involvement ==
Rosengart served as an adjunct professor of law at Fordham Law School teaching Criminal Procedure and presently serves on the board of governors of the Beverly Hills Bar Association and on the Dean's Advisory Council of Tulane University.
