= Team Abramoff =

Team of lobbyists)

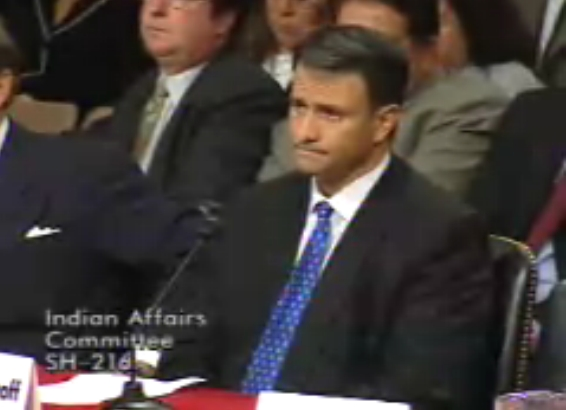
Jack Abramoff in September 2004

"Team Abramoff" is the team of lobbyists assembled by Jack Abramoff when he worked at Greenberg Traurig, primarily of former aides to prominent Congressional politicians. Their work is embroiled in the Jack Abramoff controversies.

On January 8, 2001, Abramoff left Preston Gates & Ellis to join the Government Relations division of the law firm of Greenberg Traurig, which once described him as "directly involved in the Republican party and conservative movement leadership structures" and "one of the leading fund raisers for the party and its congressional candidates." With the move to Greenberg Traurig Abramoff took as much as $6 million worth of client "work" from his old firm, including the Marianas Islands account. When asked in an interview why he moved to Greenberg Traurig, Abramoff replied "they have a dominant presence ... This move is an excellent opportunity for me and my clients with the new Administration."

At Greenberg Traurig, Abramoff assembled a "dream team" made up of lobbyists with past jobs working for congressional leaders. This team included Tony Rudy, whom Abramoff had worked extensively with during the Marianas and eLottery lobbying while Rudy was serving as chief of staff to Tom Delay. Abramoff had hired Rudy while he was still at Preston Gates, and brought him and six other staff lobbyists over to Greenberg Traurig. The hiring of Rudy was one of the first instances in a pattern by which Abramoff would directly hire aides of representatives he was actively lobbying.

Team Abramoff members Rudy and Neil Volz, Bob Ney's former chief of staff, were later named as unindicted coconspirators in Abramoff's guilty plea in the Indian lobbying scandal. In addition, Kevin Ring, Jon van Horne, Michael Smith and Stephanie Leger received secret side payments from Abramoff counter to Greenberg Traurig policy and were asked to resign. Van Horne received $20,000 from the Coushatta Tribe via Capitol Campaign Strategies. Smith also received a $20,000 payoff from CCS. Shana Tesler's husband, Samuel Hook, received $20,000 from Abramoff for serving as the titular head of Abramoff entities such as Eshkol Academy and Grassroots Interactive.

Rudy pleaded guilty to conspiracy for corruption and fraud on March 31, 2006. Volz pleaded guilty to conspiracy for corruption and fraud on May 8, 2006.

James Hirni (R) lobbyist found guilty of conspiracy for bribing Fraser Verrusio and Trevor Blackann.

1. Fraser Verrusio was Policy Director to Alaskan US Representative Don Young (R) and Policy Director for the House Transportation Committee while Rep. Young was Chairman. On March 6, 2009, he was indicted for violating federal anti-corruption laws in the long-running Jack Abramoff scandals.
2. Trevor Blackann staffer for U.S. Senator Kit Bond (R-MO) pled guilty to filing false tax returns.

**"Team Abramoff"**
Name	Former Position	Post-Abramoff
**As of March 2001**
Michelle Diedrick
Shawn Vasell	aide to Sen. Conrad Burns (R-MT)	Greenberg Traurig in 2003
**Tony C. Rudy**	Chief of staff to Rep. Tom DeLay (R-TX)	Alexander Strategy Group
Alan Slomowitz	Chief of staff to Rep. Robert Borski (D-PA)
**Todd Boulanger**	aide to former Sen. Bob Smith (R-NH)	Cassidy & Associates Inc.
Amy Berger	aide to Sen. John D. Rockefeller IV (D-WV)
Padgett Wilson	aide to Sen. Paul Coverdell (R-GA), Rep. Nathan Deal (R-GA)	Georgia’s Federal Affairs Director (lobbyist for the state)
Sara Rizzo
**Kevin A. Ring**	aide to Rep. John Doolittle (R-CA) and Sen. John Ashcroft (R-MO)	Barnes & Thornburg LLP
Julie Plocki
Susan Ralston		Assistant to Karl Rove and George W. Bush
Jon W. van Horne		Founded VHT Law PLLC with Shana Tesler
**Per Washington Post**
Edward P. Ayoob	Aide to Sen. Harry Reid (D-NV)	Barnes & Thornburg LLP
Will Brooke	Aide to Sen. Conrad Burns (R-MT)
Linsey Crisler
Duane R. Gibson	Aide to Rep. Don Young (R-AK)
Shana Tesler (Hook)	Clinton White House official	Founded VHT PLLC with Jon W. van Horne
James Forrest Miller
Brigham Pierce	Aide to Rep. Jim Santini (D-NV)
Ronald L. Platt	Aide to Sen. Lloyd M. Bentsen (D-TX)
Stephanie Leger Short	Aide to Sen. John Breaux (D-LA)	Louisiana's Director of State/Federal Relations (lobbyist for the state)
Michael D. Smith	worked for Gore-Lieberman 2000 campaign	Cornerstone Government Affairs
**Neil Volz**	Chief of staff to Rep. **Robert Ney** (R-OH)	Barnes & Thornburg LLP
Michael E. Williams	NRA lobbyist

Boldface names have pleaded guilty or are identified in the criminal indictments/plea documents.
