= Hamilton Square Baptist Church protests =

1993 LGBTQ protest in San Francisco, California

The Hamilton Square Baptist Church protests in San Francisco, California, was a protest that occurred on September 19, 1993.

The protests occurred in response to the church's invitation of Louis P. Sheldon, an anti-gay activist and chairman of the Traditional Values Coalition. The protests resulted in discussion in California regarding protests which are intended to disturb religious activity.

Testimony from a church member, cited in the California discussion claims protesters began gathering around the church property around 5:00 PM.

Protesters occupied the church grounds, shouted obscenities, and threw rocks at worshippers who wanted to enter the church. They damaged walls and fixtures, plastered obscene posters on walls and windows, and tore down a Christian flag inside the building, replacing it with the rainbow-colored "Queer Nation" flag of the gay rights activists. When they saw children standing in the lobby, the homosexual activists began shouting, "We want your children!"

Reports conflict on whether any protesters were arrested: a line in the discussion of the incident in the California legislature suggests no arrests were made, while a comment from the San Francisco Chronicle suggests three arrests were made: two for battery, and one for inciting a riot, disturbing the peace, trespassing, battery, and resisting arrest. This last article may refer to a separate event.

According to Pastor David Innes, Senior Pastor of Hamilton Square Baptist church, the protesters denied people entrance to the church and in some cases did it by physical contact.

== See also ==
- Homosexuality and Baptist churches
