= American International Center =

The American International Center LLC was a front organization established in 2001 by Michael Scanlon as part of his conspiracy with Jack Abramoff to receive and redistribute funds given by their clients for personal and political gain. AIC, like Scanlon Gould Public Affairs and Atlantic Research Analysis, was effectively a shell for Scanlon's primary company, Capitol Campaign Strategies.

Presented as a thinktank, American International Center was headed by Scanlon's childhood friends, Brian Mann, a yoga instructor, and David Grosh, a lifeguard on the Delaware shore who operated it from his beach house. Grosh had no qualifications or experience relevant to policy research and currently works in construction. At a Senate hearing into the Jack Abramoff Indian lobbying scandal, Mann refused to answer questions, but Grosh admitted that he had abetted the deception. In a prepared statement that opened his testimony, he said "I'm embarrassed and disgusted to be a part of this whole thing. The Lakota Indians have a word, Wasi'chu, which aptly describes all of us right now." The Center paid for the rent of the beach house and gave Grosh at most $2500 and some ice hockey tickets.

In a documentary Grosh recounted Scanlon's phone call to him:

"Do want to be head of an international corporation?"… I kind of laughed and I said, "All right, well, you know, what's involved? What do I got to do?" And he said, "Pretty much nothing". So I said, "Okay, sure and that's how it got started."

The American International Center received a $500,000 contribution from the Coushatta Tribe of Louisiana in 2001 via Southern Underwriters, a firm owned by a tribal member. AIC contributed $400,000 to Ralph Reed's consulting company Century Strategies to block competition to the Coushatta casino. In all, Scanlon transferred $2.3 million through AIC to Reed.
