= Jack Abramoff Indian lobbying scandal =

U.S. political scandal in the 2000s

The Jack Abramoff Indian lobbying scandal was a United States political scandal exposed in 2005; it related to fraud perpetrated by political lobbyists Jack Abramoff, Ralph E. Reed Jr., Grover Norquist, and Michael Scanlon on Native American tribes who were seeking to develop casino gambling on their reservations. The lobbyists charged the tribes an estimated $85 million in fees. Abramoff and Scanlon grossly overbilled their clients, secretly splitting the multi-million dollar profits. In one case, they secretly orchestrated lobbying against their own clients in order to force them to pay for lobbying services.

In the course of the scheme, the lobbyists were accused of illegally giving gifts and making campaign donations to legislators in return for votes or support of legislation. Representative Bob Ney (R-OH) and two aides to Tom DeLay (R-TX) were directly implicated; other politicians had various ties.

== Guilty pleas ==
Scanlon and Abramoff both pleaded guilty to a variety of criminal charges related to the scheme.

On January 3, 2006, Abramoff pleaded guilty to three felony counts—conspiracy, fraud, and tax evasion—involving charges stemming principally from his lobbying activities in Washington on behalf of Native American tribes. In addition, Abramoff and other defendants were ordered to make restitution of at least $25 million that was defrauded from clients, most notably the Native American tribes. Abramoff owes the Internal Revenue Service $1.7 million as a result of his guilty plea to the tax evasion charge.

On May 8, 2006, Neil Volz, former chief of staff to Representative Bob Ney (R-Ohio), staff director of the House Administration Committee, and later part of Team Abramoff, pleaded guilty to one count of conspiracy, including wire fraud and violating House rules, charges stemming from his work for both Ney and Greenberg Traurig.

On March 23, 2007, J. Steven Griles, former Deputy Secretary of the U.S. Department of Interior, pleaded guilty to obstruction of justice in the Senate investigation of the Abramoff scandal. A political appointee, he was the top Bush administration official to plead guilty in the scandal.

== Investigations ==
On November 25, 2005, The Wall Street Journal reported the expansion of the investigation to four members of Congress: in addition to Ney and DeLay, the report includes Rep. John Doolittle (R., Calif.) and Sen. Conrad Burns (R., Mont.) On December 2, 2005, The New York Times reported that federal prosecutors were considering a plea bargain arrangement that would give Abramoff some consideration if he provided evidence that would implicate members of Congress and their senior staffers in receiving job offers in return for legislative favors.

The guilty pleas signed by Abramoff in early January 2006 state that he bribed public officials. One of the cases of bribery described in detail involves a person identified as "Representative #1," who was reported by The Washington Post to be Representative Bob Ney (R-OH). Ney's spokesman confirmed that Ney was the representative identified, but denied any improper influence. The agreement also details Abramoff's practice of hiring former congressional staffers. Abramoff used these persons' influence to lobby their former Congressional employers, in violation of a one-year federal ban on such lobbying.

After Abramoff's guilty plea, the federal government shifted its investigation in January 2006 to focus on the lobbying firm Alexander Strategy Group, founded by a "close friend of DeLay's and his former chief of staff." The lobbying firm announced its closure at the end of the same month due to "fatal publicity"; it had represented such large firms as Microsoft and PhRMA.

On June 22, 2006, the U.S. Senate Committee on Indian Affairs released its final report on the scandal. The report states that under the guidance of the Mississippi Choctaw tribe's planner, Nell Rogers, the tribe agreed to launder money because "Ralph Reed did not want to be paid directly by a tribe with gaming interests." It also states that Reed used non-profits, including Grover Norquist's Americans for Tax Reform, as pass-throughs to disguise the origin of the funds, and that "the structure was recommended by Jack Abramoff to accommodate Mr. Reed's political concerns."

ABC News reported on November 15, 2006, that Abramoff told prosecutors that Senator Harry Reid (D) requested contributions of $30,000 from the lobbyist's clients. After being paid, Reid agreed to assist Abramoff in matters concerning Indian casinos.

In August 2010, the federal government ended a six-year investigation of DeLay's ties to Abramoff, according to Richard Cullen, DeLay's lead counsel in the matter. State prosecution continued in Texas, which ended in November 2010 with DeLay being found guilty of conspiracy and money laundering. In January 2011, he was sentenced to three years in state prison. DeLay appealed his conviction to the Texas Court of Appeals for the Third District at Austin, which heard oral arguments on October 10, 2012. On September 19, 2013, a ruling by the Court of Appeals overturned his convictions and entered an acquittal. The Texas Court of Criminal Appeals granted the prosecution's petition for discretionary review on March 19, 2013, agreeing to review the decision of the Texas Court of Appeals Third District. The Texas Court of Criminal Appeals ruled, 8–1, to affirm the lower courts' dismissal on October 1, 2014.

== Background ==
=== Mississippi Choctaw—introduction to tribal lobbying ===
In the second half of the 1990s, Abramoff was employed by Preston Gates Ellis & Rouvelas Meeds LLP, the lobbying arm of Preston Gates & Ellis LLP law firm based in Seattle, Washington. In 1995, Abramoff began representing Native American tribes that were seeking to establish gambling on reservations, starting with the Mississippi Band of Choctaw Indians.

The Choctaw originally had lobbied the federal government directly, but beginning in 1994, they found that many of the congressional members who had responded to their issues had either retired or were defeated in the "Republican Revolution" of the 1994 elections. Nell Rogers, the tribe's specialist on legislative affairs, had a friend who was familiar with Abramoff's father and Abramoff's work as a Republican activist. The tribe contacted Preston Gates, and soon after hired the firm and Abramoff.

One of Abramoff's first actions was to defeat a Congressional bill that sought to use the unrelated business income tax (UBIT) to tax Native American casinos; it was sponsored by Reps. Bill Archer (R-TX) and Ernest Istook (R-OK). Since the matter involved taxation, Abramoff enlisted help from his college acquaintance, fellow Republican Grover Norquist, and his Americans for Tax Reform (ATR). The bill was eventually defeated in 1996 in the Senate, due in part to grassroots work by ATR, for which the Choctaw paid $60,000.

According to Washington Business Forward, a lobbying trade magazine, "[Tom DeLay] was a major factor in those victories, and the fight helped cement the alliance between the two men.

=== Ralph Reed and Grover Norquist ===
Later in 1999, Abramoff enlisted the help of another Republican friend, Ralph Reed. The Choctaw needed to defeat a bill in the Alabama State Legislature that would allow casino-style games at dog racing tracks. This would have resulted in competition for their casino business. Reed had recently contacted Abramoff via email, looking for some help in establishing new business.

Hey, now that I'm done with electoral politics, I need to start humping in corporate accounts! I'm counting on you to help me with some contacts.

— Ralph Reed to Jack Abramoff, via email, November 12, 1998

Reed proposed to Abramoff some work which he and his firm, Century Strategies, could perform. Reed could access "3,000 pastors and 90,000 religious conservative households" in Alabama, as well as "the Alabama Christian Coalition, the Alabama Family Alliance, the Alabama Eagle Forum, [and] the Christian Family Association." Reed wanted a $20,000 per month retainer for his services.

On April 6, 1999, Abramoff got Preston Gates to approve hiring Reed as a subcontractor, and told Reed to "get me invoices as soon as possible so I can get Choctaw to get us checks asap."

By May 10, 1999, the Choctaw had paid $1.3 million to Reed via Preston Gates, for various grassroots activities relating to the dog-track bill, as well as opposing an Alabama state lottery.

The tribe discontinued paying the money through Preston Gates when Abramoff suggested that they use Norquist's Americans for Tax Reform as a conduit, to which the tribe agreed. Although the anti-gambling effort was not related to ATR's anti-taxation activities, ATR passed checks of up to $300,000 from the Choctaw to Reed's firm, in one case taking $25,000 as a "management fee". Later in 1999, Abramoff used Reed's services again to oppose the federal Internet Gambling Prohibition Act, on behalf of eLottery, a corporate client.

=== "Team Abramoff" ===
At Greenberg Traurig, Abramoff assembled a "dream team" made up of men who had previously worked as staff for Congressional leaders. The team included Tony Rudy, with whom Abramoff had worked extensively during the Marianas and eLottery lobbying, while Rudy was serving as Chief of Staff to Tom DeLay. Abramoff had hired Rudy while he was still at Preston Gates & Ellis, and brought him and six other staff lobbyists over to Greenberg Traurig. The hiring of Rudy was one of the first instances in a pattern by which Abramoff would directly hire former aides of representatives whom he was actively lobbying.

=== 2001 White House transition team member ===
Because he was dealing with Native American tribes, Abramoff needed a contact in the Department of Interior, where the Bureau of Indian Affairs (BIA) oversaw Indian affairs. His main contact in the office of Deputy Secretary of the Interior Steven Griles was Italia Federici, a former political aide to Secretary of the Interior Gale Norton. The lobbyist's main contact in the West Wing of the White House was his former aide Susan Ralston, who became the Executive Assistant to Karl Rove, then Senior Advisor to President George W. Bush. In 2007 Griles and Federici pleaded guilty to obstruction of justice in the Senate investigation of the Abramoff scandal; Griles on March 23 and Federici on June 8.

== "Gimme Five" begins ==
Abramoff and Michael Scanlon appeared to begin their plan for fraud via an email exchange on June 18, 2001, as documented in "Gimme Five"—Investigation of Tribal Lobbying Matters, the final report of the Senate Committee on Indian Affairs' investigation into Abramoff.

After his career in the office of Congressman Tom Delay, Scanlon had briefly been a member of Team Abramoff. He set up his own public affairs consulting firm and contacted Abramoff.

A few weeks ago you mentioned something to me—I took the concept and have put together a plan that will make serious money. We also talked briefly about it in the beginning of the year but I think we can really move it now.

— Michael Scanlon to Jack Abramoff, via email, June 18, 2001.

Scanlon described a plan by which Abramoff would help to build the client base of Scanlon's firm, Campaign Capitol Strategies, up to at least $3 million per year. At some point, Scanlon would use his contacts in the public affairs industry to get the firm acquired at a price of three times the revenue, and Scanlon and Abramoff would split the profits. This is considered by investigators to be the beginning of what Abramoff and Scanlon would refer to as "gimme five".

=== Louisiana Coushatta ===
In 2001, the Louisiana Coushatta tribe were going to renegotiate their gambling compact with the State of Louisiana. The tribe was interested in negotiating a 25-year compact with the state, but was expecting a "very vigorous fight" and were not certain that their current lobbying representatives were up to the challenge.

Abramoff and Scanlon were well recommended to the tribe by a representative of the Chitimacha Tribe of Louisiana. Kathryn Van Hoof, the Coushatta's outside counsel, introduced the idea to the Tribal Council that having a high-powered Federal lobbyist could help also with any problems on the state level.

=== Abramoff and Scanlon make their pitch ===
A few weeks later, after collecting details of the Coushatta's lobbying needs from Van Hoof, Abramoff and Scanlon gave a presentation to the Tribal Council. Abramoff claimed that he could get appropriation earmarks for the tribe, and "get things passed through the legislature". Abramoff mentioned his and Scanlon's ties with Tom DeLay, and the fact that he "worked with people" in the Department of Interior. Abramoff also suggested that participating in a DeLay golf tournament and paying "lists of suggested contributions" would give the tribe name recognition and access to politicians.

Scanlon claimed that his firm could organize direct mail, telephone, and media campaigns, as well as giving advice on strategies to gain the support of or neutralize the opposition of specific public officials. Scanlon also promised a customized database and "electronic-related services", based on polling and collection of information of individuals who could be "mobilized" in letter-writing campaigns and phone calls to officials.

The Tribal Council was initially somewhat confused by the relationship between Abramoff and Scanlon; one member believed that Scanlon's company was a branch of Greenberg Traurig. However, the two men were hired and paid separately. Members of the tribe later claimed that Abramoff "never told the Council that he would personally collect a share of those proceeds that the tribe paid Scanlon." The tribe agreed on March 20, 2001, to hire Abramoff at a relatively high retainer of $125,000 a month, plus expenses. On April 12, the tribe agreed to hire Scanlon's firm for $534,500 for initial work on the compact renegotiation.

In July 2001, Louisiana Governor Mike Foster approved the new gambling compact. The tribe later claimed that there was evidence that Scanlon's proposed strategies were implemented. Abramoff and Scanlon proposed a much larger scope of work to the tribe.

=== Texas Menace ===
The Ysleta del Sur Pueblo, or "Tigua tribe" opened its Speaking Rock Casino near El Paso, Texas in 1993. In 1999 the State of Texas sought to have the casino closed based on its interpretation of the Tribal Restoration Act, which had granted the tribe Federal recognition. The act stated that "[all] gaming activities which are prohibited by the laws of the State of Texas are hereby prohibited on the reservation and on lands of the tribe." The State of Texas interpreted this provision as allowing state law to preempt the tribe's ability to operate a casino. Future senator John Cornyn led the court challenge as the Texas Attorney General. The State of Texas succeeded in closing the casino in 2002.

In October 2001, Abramoff suggested to the Louisiana Coushatta that the Texas legislature was "one vote away" from legalizing certain forms of gambling in Texas. The Alabama Coushatta, a related but competing tribe, was also seeking to open a casino in eastern Texas in 2001. Abramoff told the Louisiana Coushatta that if the Tigua succeeded in their court case, Texas would be forced to allow the Alabama Coushatta to open a casino in the state.

As the Louisiana Coushatta attracted many customers from eastern Texas to their casino, a Texas-based Native American casino could pose a grave threat to their livelihood. Scanlon suggested forming a "Grassroots Political Structure" in Texas to oppose the Tigua's effort to have gambling approved on their land. Abramoff and Scanlon succeeded in negotiating nearly $4 million in additional fees for a "Louisiana Program". Although the fees were purportedly to support grassroots activities, Scanlon insisted that $1 million be paid directly to Greenberg Traurig. He said, "we plan to do some things through the law firm umbrella due to their highly sensitive nature and confidentiality reasons. I hate hiding behind lawyers—but we are going to do some crazy stuff on this one—so I guess it's ok." In fact, the day before Abramoff had directed Scanlon by email to run some of the fees money directly through his firm: "I want to see if we can pump up our LDA [reporting requirements under the Lobbying Disclosure Act] for the second half to make sure we don't fall out of the top ten [lobbying firms]. I can achieve this if I can run some of the money for the Coushattas through the firm and then get it to CCS." Abramoff deceived both the Coushatta and Greenberg Traurig by having the money redirected as a donation to the Capital Athletic Foundation.

Abramoff and Scanlon suggested to the Coushatta that they ought to support Christian evangelical conservatives, as they were expected to oppose gaming expansion in Texas. Abramoff specifically suggested the tribe work with Republican Ralph Reed but, according to a tribal leader, he warned that "it can't get out ... It wouldn't look good if they're receiving money from a casino-operating tribe to oppose gaming. It would be kind of like hypocritical." The tribe paid Reed via Southern Underwriters, a Louisiana insurance company, which made payments to American International Center, a shell corporation controlled by Scanlon. Scanlon and Abramoff skimmed millions of dollars for themselves from fees paid through this method.

Reed worked with Houston pastors and church congregations to demand that the state government prevent the Tigua casinos from opening. Reed also claimed to work directly with John Cornyn; in a November 15 email, Abramoff claimed "Ralph and I spoke last night. Cornyn is supposed to call Ralph as soon as he can make it to a phone after El Paso." However, in a Meet the Press interviews on January 8, 2006, Senator Cornyn denied any direct connection to the lobbyists.

In addition to working on grassroots efforts, Abramoff claimed that he had also influenced the Lieutenant Governor of Texas, Bill Ratliff, to prevent a bill to allow the Tigua to open their casino from being scheduled for a vote in the State Senate. The opposition efforts succeeded, and the Tigua officially closed their casino on February 12, 2002.

=== "Saving" the Tigua ===
Jack Abramoff: "Fire up the jet baby, we're going to El Paso!!"

Mike Scanlon: "I want all their MONEY!!!"

— Email interchange between Jack Abramoff and Mike Scanlon, February 6, 2002.

As the Tigua casino was being closed, Abramoff was trying to contact the Tigua tribe. He reached the Tigua's public relations representative Marc Schwartz on February 6, 2002, and met with the tribal council on February 12. According to Schwartz, Abramoff "expressed indignation" over what had happened to the tribe and said that he wanted to "right the terrible injustice that had been brought upon the tribe." During the meeting, Abramoff admitted that he was friends with Ralph Reed, who had publicly called for the closing of the casino, but claimed that Reed was "crazy, like other folks in the Christian Coalition". He said that Reed was supplying information about the anti-gambling effort to Abramoff, so he knew their strategy. He also admitted that the Louisiana Coushatta were also his client, but claimed that the Coushatta did not have a problem with the Tigua pursuing a casino.

Abramoff proposed that he and Greenberg Traurig would represent the tribe pro bono until the casino was re-opened. But, he said they would have to pay "a lot" for Scanlon's services. The strategy, later called "Operation Open Doors", would cost more than $5 million. He proposed getting a friendly lawmaker to sneak a provision or rider into a federal bill that would permit the Tigua to reopen their casino, and said that it would require the tribe to make contributions to the lawmakers. Abramoff mentioned Scanlon's past career in the office of Tom DeLay, and Scanlon said that he "had an ongoing relationship with Congressman DeLay." During his presentation, Abramoff gave the tribe a list of contributions to legislators, which he said were required, and advised the tribe to make these immediately.

Once the provision was made law, opponents would try to repeal it. The second part of Abramoff's strategy was for Scanlon to create a nationwide database of grassroots supporters who could be called on to send letters and make phone calls to representatives to block any repeal. The Tigua agreed to the proposal on the condition that it cost no more than $4.2 million, and signed the contract on March 5, 2002.

== Guilty plea—confirmed corrupt lobbying practices ==
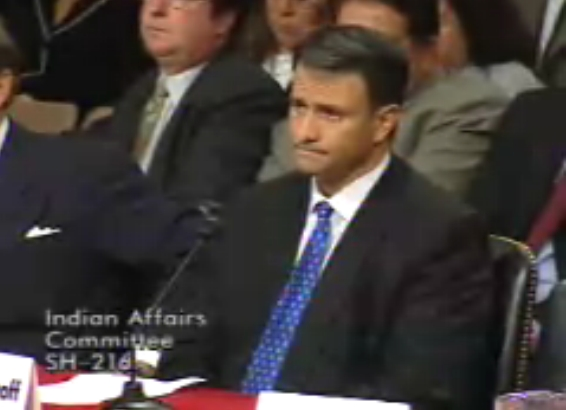
Jack Abramoff testified before the Senate Indian Affairs Committee on September 29, 2004, where he repeatedly refused to answer Senators' questions by "taking the fifth".

Abramoff and his partner Scanlon are alleged to have engaged in a series of corrupt practices in connection to their lobbying work for various Indian gaming tribes. The fees paid to Abramoff and Scanlon for this work are believed to exceed $85 million.

In particular, Abramoff and Scanlon were alleged to have conspired with Washington power broker Grover Norquist and Christian activist Ralph Reed to coordinate lobbying against his own clients and prospective clients with the objective of forcing them to engage Abramoff and Scanlon to lobby against their own covert operations. Reed was paid to campaign against gambling interests that competed with Abramoff clients. Norquist served as a go-between by funneling money to Reed.

=== Allegations of double dealing ===
On June 22, 2000, Susan Ralston e-mailed Abramoff, "I have 3 checks from elot: (1) 2 checks for $80K payable to ATR and (2) 1 check to TVC for $25K," ... "Let me know exactly what to do next. Send to Grover? Send to Rev. Lou?"

This email documented that eLottery money went through Norquist's foundation, Americans for Tax Reform (ATR), the Faith and Family Alliance, and Reed's company, Century Strategies. The last check was sent to Sheldon's Traditional Values Coalition (TVC).

In 2000, Abramoff forced the Choctaw to give the Alabama Christian Coalition of America $1.15 million in installments. Norquist agreed to pass the money on to the Coalition and another Alabama anti-gambling group, both of which Reed was mobilizing for the fight against a proposed Alabama state lottery.

In 2002, after Abramoff worked with Reed to close the casino of the Tigua tribe, he persuaded the tribe to hire him to lobby Congress to reopen the casino.

Of the $7.7 million Abramoff and Scanlon charged the Choctaw for projects in 2001, they spent $1.2 million on the tribe's behalf and split the rest in a scheme they called "gimme five."

=== Guilty plea—confirmed spending irregularities ===
In 2004, Abramoff resigned from Greenberg Traurig amid a scandal related to spending irregularities in his work as a lobbyist for Native American tribes involved in gambling, namely The Mississippi Choctaw, the Louisiana Coushatta, the Agua Caliente Band of Cahuilla Indians, Sandia Pueblo, the Saginaw Chippewa and the Tigua of Ysleta del Sur Pueblo.

The Mississippi Band of Choctaw Indians paid $15 million to Abramoff and Scanlon's organizations. The bills were heavily padded. For example, in April 2000 he padded 2 hours with over 60 hours to achieve a "$150k minimum." The funds were diverted to a number of projects, including the Eshkol Academy, an all-boys Orthodox Jewish school set up by Abramoff in Maryland.

=== American International Center ===
Part of the sums paid by the tribes for lobbying were paid to the American International Center, a purported think tank headed by David Grosh. In fact, he was a lifeguard on the Delaware shore who "operated" the organization from his beach house. Grosh had no qualifications or experience relevant to policy research and, at the time of the Congressional investigation, was working in construction. At a Senate hearing, Grosh admitted that he had abetted the deception and said that he was "embarrassed and disgusted to be a part of this whole thing."

=== Derogatory references to Native American clients ===
In emails now made public by the Senate Committee on Indian Affairs, which is investigating his activities, Abramoff repeatedly referred to Native Americans as "monkeys," "troglodites," and "morons."

Abramoff once asked his co-conspirator Scanlon to meet a client, saying in an email, "I have to meet with the monkeys from the Choctaw tribal council. You need to close the deal ... with the client ..." In another email message he wrote, "we need to get some money from those monkeys!!"

About one tribal client Abramoff wrote to Scanlon (date unknown),

These mofos are the stupidest idiots in the land for sure.

== Abramoff's monetary influence ==
Abramoff spent millions of dollars to influence and entertain Republican politicians. Abramoff had a reputation for largesse considered exceptional even by Washington standards. In addition to offering many Republican members of Congress expensive free meals at his restaurant, Signatures, Abramoff maintained four skyboxes at major sports arenas for political entertaining, at a cost of more than $1 million a year. Abramoff hosted many fundraisers at these skyboxes, including events for Republican politicians publicly opposed to gambling, such as John Doolittle. Abramoff gave over $260,000 in personal contributions to Republican candidates, politicians, and organizations, and funded numerous trips for politicians and staffers, including both Republicans and Democrats. An estimated two thirds of Ambramoff's direct contributions went to Republican congressmen, and one third to Democratic congressional leaders.

Of the approximately $85 million in tribal money entrusted to Abramoff, his employers, or his related organizations, over $4.4 million since 1999 were directed to at least 250 members of Congress, primarily Republicans in leadership positions or on relevant committees, and Democrats with standing connections to Native American interests, such as Senate Minority Leader Harry Reid (D-NV) (in a 2-1 GOP ratio). These contributions have since become tainted by their association with Abramoff's criminal behavior.

Some of those who received money from Abramoff or his clients have either returned the money or donated it. For example, months after the investigations began, on December 14, 2005, The Washington Post reported that Senator Byron Dorgan (D-ND), the vice-chairman for the US Senate Indian Affairs Committee, had announced he would return $67,000 in contributions from Indian tribes represented by Abramoff. Others, such as Representative John Doolittle (R-CA), have refused to do so. Rep. J.D. Hayworth (R-AZ), co-chairman of the Congressional Native American Caucus, received more than $150,000 from Indian tribes once represented by Abramoff. He was the largest single recipient of Abramoff-related money. Hayworth said he would keep the donations because they were given independently of Abramoff's influence. He donated to charity $2,250 which was paid directly by Abramoff.

== Other connected parties ==
=== The Bush Administration ===
==== US GSA Chief Procurement Officer David Hossein Safavian ====
On September 19, 2005, David Safavian, who was serving as the head of the federal procurement policy at the Office of Management and Budget, was the first person arrested in the Abramoff scandal. Safavian was charged with lying to investigators and obstructing the federal inquiry of Abramoff. Safavian knew Abramoff from the three years, 1995–1997, when he was part of Abramoff's lobbying team at Preston Gates & Ellis.

==== Deputy United States Secretary of the Interior J. Steven Griles ====
Abramoff claimed in emails sent in 2002 that Deputy United States Secretary of the Interior Griles had pledged to block an Indian casino that would compete with one of his clients. Abramoff later told two people that he was trying to hire Griles.

Mr. Griles pled guilty to a felony charge of lying to the Senate Indian Affairs Committee about his ties to Jack Abramoff. In March 2007, he was sentenced to a five-month jail term and another five months in a halfway house or home confinement.

==== Campaign contributions from Abramoff and his clients ====
Abramoff also personally donated $14,000 over the period 1999–2004 to the congressional campaign of Representative John Doolittle (R-CA) According to The Washington Post, Doolittle "was particularly close to Abramoff." Doolittle said he always thought of Abramoff as "a friend" for a single reason: "I liked him, frankly, because he was a partisan, conservative Republican activist." Unlike many lawmakers, Doolittle has refused to give away or return any of the Abramoff money.

==== Fund raising by Abramoff for Doolittle ====
An "ardent opponent of casino gambling," Doolittle held a fundraiser at Jack Abramoff's skybox at the MCI Center in February 1999. Abramoff, who rented the boxes himself, billed Indian tribes lobbying fees to cover his cost. These tribes had hired Abramoff to represent their casino interests.

Under federal campaign finance law, Doolittle was required to pay Abramoff for use of the box, or to report the use as an "in-kind" contribution from Abramoff to his campaign. Doolittle initially failed to report the use of the sky-boxes in his Federal Election Committee filings. In late 2004, his spokesperson, Laura Blackman, said "It was an in-kind contribution, and it was an oversight that it wasn't reported, but we are taking steps to correct that."

In January 2005, Doolittle reported that his campaign fund had sent a check for $1,040 to one of Abramoff's former employers, the Preston Gates lobbying firm, to pay for the skybox. The lobbying firm returned the check because it had never owned the skybox. In May 2005, Doolittle campaign-fund spokesman Richard Robinson acknowledged that the rejection of the check should have been reported to the FEC and said a corrected accounting would be filed. Robinson said Doolittle's fund is determined to rectify the six-year lapse in paying for the box. "If we find out that Jack Abramoff paid for the suite, then we'll reimburse Jack Abramoff, because we want to reimburse the person or entity who paid for the box," Robinson said. "We thought we were doing that in January."

==== Payments to Doolittle's wife by Abramoff ====
From August 2002 through February 2004, Abramoff's lobbying firm, Greenberg Traurig paid Julie Doolittle $66,000. Initially her work was to help plan a fundraiser for Abramoff's Capital Athletic Foundation, called the Spy Game Gala, which was to be MC'ed by Tony Snow. The event never happened because it coincided with the beginning of the 2003 invasion of Iraq in March 2003. According to the initial statement by her attorney, the $66,000 in payments from Abramoff were because she "primarily performed public relations and other event planning services for the Spy Museum event."

She was paid a total of $27,000 through February 2003, when payments stopped. In July 2003, Abramoff (via Greenberg Traurig) began paying her again, at the rate of $5,000 per month. This continued through mid-February 2004, when the first story on what would become the Abramoff scandal was published.

In a statement in June 2006, her attorney, William Stauffer, said that "Sierra Dominion, a small business owned by Julie Doolittle, provided marketing, event planning, and related services to the Greenberg Traurig law firm, and its partner, Jack Abramoff, from August 2002 through March 2004." "Sierra Dominion had a retainer arrangement with Greenberg Traurig under which it provided services concerning the Spy Museum event and also the Signatures and Stacks restaurants". (The two restaurants were owned by Abramoff.)

Julie Doolittle's records in connection with her work for Abramoff have been subpoenaed by the United States Department of Justice. The DOJ has not filed any charges in either case. No explanation has been given as to why Greenberg Taurig made the payments to Julie Doolittle, rather than the foundation (for whom the charity event was planned) or the restaurants or Abramoff personally (as restaurant owner).

==== Doolittle's actions on behalf of Indian tribes ====
In February 2002, Doolittle was among more than two dozen lawmakers who signed a letter to Secretary of the Interior Gale Norton urging her to reject an Indian casino opposed by Abramoff's tribal clients.

In October 2003, Doolittle appealed in a letter to Norton for quicker action for the Mashpee Wampanoag people of Massachusetts, which was seeking federal recognition as a tribe; the Wampanoag group was also a client of Greenberg Traurig, and Kevin Ring was a lobbyist on the account.

==== Doolittle's actions on behalf of the Commonwealth of Northern Mariana Islands (CNMI) ====
One of Abramoff's major clients was the Commonwealth of the Northern Mariana Islands government. Doolittle visited the islands in February 1999 as part of a congressional delegation. In April 2000 and April 2001, he met with CNMI House Speaker Benigno R. Fitial in Washington D.C. On May 25, 2001, the Saipan Tribune printed a letter from Doolittle to Fitial, which noted a recent $150,000 earmark, mentioned two possible Army Corps of Engineers projects on the islands, and said "I will urge the Energy and Water Appropriations Subcommittee to include funding for the feasibility study for both projects in the FY 2002 appropriations bill." In August 2001, he backed Fitial's candidacy for governor. Doolittle was successful in securing $400,000 in Corps study funds in 2001, his first year on the House Appropriations Subcommittee on Energy and Water Development.

In the governor's election in early 2002, Fitial lost. The new governor, Juan N. Babauta, cancelled the contract with Greenberg Traurig.

==== Justice Department actions and hiring of lawyer ====
Since then, "The congressman has not been subpoenaed or questioned by the Justice Department," as of December, 2005.

On January 27, 2006, three weeks after Abramoff pleaded guilty to three federal felonies, Doolittle retained the legal services of the Virginia law firm of Williams Mullen. Doolittle's chief of staff, Richard Robinson, said the attorney handling Doolittle's inquiry is David Barger. Barger is the former president of the Virginia Bar Association's criminal law section and a former assistant US attorney who later was an associate of special prosecutor Kenneth Starr in the Whitewater investigation during the Clinton administration.

Robinson said the campaign (which paid a $10,000 retainer) has hired Barger to address Doolittle's concerns about how he should respond to questions from the press as he contemplated having to talk about the scandal as part of his campaign for re-election. "The congressman has not retained an attorney to respond to any Justice Department inquiries as there have been none," Robinson said.

=== Activities of Julie Doolittle ===
John Doolittle, Steve Lund (President of the Roseville Rotary) and Julie Doolittle at a Rotary lunch on August 1, 2006.

During the 2001-2005 period, Julie Doolittle had at least three different occupations: she worked for Jack Abramoff doing event planning (see above); she worked as a bookkeeper for a lobbying firm; and she worked on commission as a fundraiser for her husband. (Richard Robinson, Doolittle's chief of staff, said Julie Doolittle had other clients. But he refused to provide their names "out of respect for the privacy of the clients.")

Payments to Julie Doolittle during the period were done via a company called Sierra Dominion Financial Solutions. It was founded in March 2001, just after Congressman Doolittle gained a seat on the Appropriations Committee. It is based at the couple's home in Oakton, Virginia; Julie is the only employee. The company (that is, Julie) has continued to do fundraising, but no event planning or other work, since the Abramoff scandal first became public in early 2005.

==== Work for lobbying firm ====
From 2002 until mid-2005, the Alexander Strategy Group, a Washington, D.C. lobbying firm with close ties to Congressman Tom DeLay, paid Sierra Dominion for bookkeeping work for a nonprofit group called the Korea-U.S. Exchange Council (KORUSEC), created by Ed Buckham, a partner in the firm, and located at the ASG headquarters. KORUSEC is also connected to Kevin Ring, one of Doolittle's former assistants.

=== Maryland – Edward B. Miller ===
In 2005, a federal grand jury issued a subpoena in 2005 to Edward B Miller, the deputy chief of staff of the Republican governor of Maryland, Robert L. Ehrlich, because of Miller's connection to Grassroots Interactive.

== In popular culture ==
- The Abramoff scandal was the basis of the Law & Order: Criminal Intent episode "Wasichu", in which a lobbyist's wife is murdered. The lobbyist was found to have been bribing a Congressman with lavish gifts and fact-finding trips on private jets, and was also double-dealing on the issue of an Indian casino. The lobbyist in this episode used the term "gimme five" to describe his schemes.

== List of Jack Abramoff's tribal clients ==
Several Native American tribes were defrauded by lobbyist Jack Abramoff in his namesake Indian lobbying scandal.

- Agua Caliente Band of Cahuilla Indians of California
- Cherokee Nation, Oklahoma
- Chitimacha Tribe of Louisiana
- Coushatta Tribe of Louisiana: Paid Capitol Campaign Strategies at least $30.5 million from March 2001 to May 2003, of which about $21.9 million was diverted.
- Mississippi Band of Choctaw Indians: Paid Capitol Campaign Strategies at least $14,765,000 from June 2001 to April 2004, of which about $12.7 million was diverted.
- Pueblo of Sandia: Paid Scanlon $2.75 million, of which about $2.35 million was diverted.
- Pueblo of Santa Clara: Paid Abramoff about $20,000 in 2003
- Saginaw Chippewa Indian Tribe: Paid Capitol Campaign Strategies at least $3.5 million from June 2002 to October 2003, of which over $1 million was diverted.
- Ysleta Del Sur Pueblo of Texas (Tigua tribe): After having a casino blocked by lobbying efforts on the part of Ralph Reed, which were secretly paid for by Abramoff using money from competing tribes, Abramoff solicited $4.2 million from the Tiguas in March 2002, of which approximately $3.7 million was diverted in the "Gimme Five" scheme.

== See also ==
- Monetary influence of Jack Abramoff
