= Eshkol Academy =

All-boys Orthodox Jewish day school in Columbia, Maryland, US

Coordinates: 39°10′12″N 76°50′58″W

Eshkol Academy was an all-boys Orthodox Jewish day school in Columbia, Maryland, that existed from fall 2002 to 2004. Its name comes from Ish Shekol Bo Hebrew for "well-rounded man" and Eshkol Hebrew for cluster of grapes. In 2002 Eshkol Academy opened at a Christian community center facility in Montgomery County; in 2003 it moved to an office park in Columbia, Maryland. Its enrollment of about 100 included both local students and students from Boston, Baltimore, Montreal, and other cities.

The school was founded by Jack Abramoff and funded through his Capital Athletic Foundation. He sent two of his three sons to the school. In all, about $5 million of Capital Athletic Foundation's money was directed to the Eshkol Academy operations. For the year 2002 the dean was Rabbi David Lapin, brother of Toward Tradition's Rabbi Daniel Lapin.

According to emails revealed during the US Senate hearings into the Abramoff-Reed Indian Gambling Scandal, David Lapin was paid through Abramoff's Capital Athletic Foundation. Tax records show that Lapin received a total of $60,529 in 2002. The Eshkol Academy closed in 2004 after questions were raised in the press about Abramoff's financial dealings with Indian tribes.

The filings of the Capital Athletic Foundation show that Eshkol Academy received a large portion of its contributions: at least $50,000 in 2001, $1,857,704 in 2002, and $2,366,512 in 2003. In addition, CAF purchased for the school's use a van ($26,060), thermal imager ($18,057), and Torah ($17,000). Eshkol purchases included two Zamboni HDs, for a planned but never purchased hockey rink for the school.

Furthermore Abramoff established the organization Beis Avrohom Chaim as, according to the 2003 CAF tax return, "a religious organization" that "provides religious services for the congregation and housing for the Eshkol Academy student athletes." In fact, a number of students were housed there. It received $251,242 in 2003 from CAF and purchased a house near to Abramoff's Silver Spring residence to house students from outside the area. It was occupied by students and the school's athletic director/dorm counselor. Beis Avrohom Chaim was incorporated in June 2003 under Maryland law as a religious corporation. The trustees were Jack Abramoff and his wife; Shana Tesler, a former "Team Abramoff" Greenberg Traurig employee; and her husband Samuel Hook.

In 2004, thirteen former Eshkol employees sued the Academy, demanding nearly $150,000 in back salary. The teachers' complaint claims that the Capital Athletic Foundation "was used to launder funds from the tribes to Eshkol."
