= GrassRoots Interactive =

American lobbying firm

GrassRoots Interactive (GRI), now defunct, was a small Silver Spring, Maryland, United States, lobbying firm controlled by Jack Abramoff. It was founded "with a $10,000 investment" by the company's sole owner, Republican lawyer Edward B. Miller, in May 2003, "a month after he began work as a senior official in the state Department of Business and Economic Development." Miller, then a lawyer at DLA Piper Rudnick Gray Cary, is a former aide to Governor of Maryland Robert L. Ehrlich, Jr. and "was promoted to deputy chief of staff in the governor's office" in early 2004.

Documents, including copies of canceled checks, show that millions of dollars flowed into GrassRoots Interactive in 2003, the year it was created, and then flowed out again to unusual places. At least $2.3 million went to a California consulting firm that used the same address as the law office of Abramoff's brother, Robert. A separate check for $400,000, from GrassRoots, was made out to Kay Gold LLC, another Abramoff family company.

In September 2003, Miller sold Grassroots to Samuel Hook, an associate of indicted lobbyist and Republican fund-raiser Jack Abramoff at the law firm Greenberg Traurig.

== Tyco ==
GrassRoots Interactive "came under scrutiny on Capitol Hill in recent months when the Senate Judiciary Committee considered" President George W. Bush's nomination of Timothy E. Flanigan, a senior lawyer at Tyco International Ltd., a "former lobbying client of Mr. Abramoff, as the No. 2 official at the Justice Department."

Around the same time in May 2003, when Miller founded GRI, according to Flanigan's testimony, Miller was introduced to Abramoff and retained him as a lobbyist.

Abramoff and his firm "persuaded" Tyco "to hire Grassroots for a lobbying effort to protect tax breaks the company received as an offshore corporation based in Bermuda... Tyco paid Grassroots to promote its position that not all offshore companies sought to avoid U.S. taxes, Flanigan said. Grassroots were also supposed to coordinate efforts with advocacy groups that shared Tyco's views and arrange for radio ads supportive of the company's position."

GRI "collected hefty fees" from Tyco, "money that was allegedly diverted to other entities controlled by Abramoff and misspent."

Flanigan, "told the committee that at Mr. Abramoff's suggestion, he had directed $2 million to GrassRoots from Tyco for lobbying on the company's behalf."

Around April 2004, "Greenberg Traurig officials contacted Flanigan to inform him that the firm had conducted an internal investigation and found that Abramoff had used Grassroots to launder about $1.5 million in Tyco money, which he diverted to accounts he controlled... Greenberg Traurig agreed to repay Tyco that sum after learning they 'were apparently deceived' by Abramoff, Flanigan said."

== Gabon ==
A document from Abramoff's files shows that in the summer of 2003, he pushed to sign President Omar Bongo of the poor West Central African nation of Gabon as a client, even offering to travel to Gabon immediately after an August golfing vacation to Scotland "with the congressmen and senators I take there each year." Documents also show that Abramoff and his colleagues drew up a draft contract that called for $9 million in fees from Gabon to be paid to GRI.
