= Capital Athletic Foundation =

US non-profit organization and front group

The Capital Athletic Foundation is a 501(c)(3) charity organization founded in 2000. The organization's nominal purpose was to provide needy youths with athletic opportunities. The organization has been used by its founder, Jack Abramoff, as a front group for channeling money into his own political causes. In its first four years of operation, the charity collected nearly $6 million.

== Fraud scandal ==
According to information revealed by The Washington Post during the US Senate hearings into the Jack Abramoff Indian lobbying scandal, Abramoff channeled money from corporate clients into the foundation and spent the overwhelming portion of its money on projects having little to do with the advertised sportsmanship programs, including political causes, the Eshkol Academy and an overseas golf trip for Bob Ney. Less than 1% of its revenue was spent on sports-related programs for youths.

=== Timeline ===
- In 2000, Abramoff sought a $5,000,000 federal earmark for CAF, then called Capital Education and Athletic Foundation. He solicited the help of Rep. Connie Morella and apparently worked with Tony Rudy, who was then Chief of Staff to Tom DeLay, but was unsuccessful.
- In 2001, CAF received $1 million from the Coushatta and $177,415 from Foxcom. The Coushatta apparently believed that the donation was for a sky box from which Abramoff would lobby members of Congress during Redskins games.
- In 2002, CAF collected $2.56 million from 9 donors including 3 tribes.
- In 2003, CAF collected $2.15 million from tribes, Michael Scanlon and an internet casino client of Abramoff’s. $2.13 million of the money went to the Eshkol Academy, a school started [in 2001] by Abramoff.
- In a February 2003 email, Abramoff told Scanlon to make sure that his share of money went to Eshkol directly – "using school as conduit for some of our activities . .. If that won’t fly with them, use CAF."
- CAF also paid $120,000 in August 2002 for Abramoff, Robert W. Ney, Ralph E. Reed, Jr., and then-General Services Administration Chief of Staff David Safavian "to St. Andrews to play golf with a stop in London on way back. Ney later claimed that the trip’s purpose was to raise money for a foundation, but there were no fundraising events during the course of the trip."
- $700,000 of the aforementioned money was passed through the National Center for Public Policy Research, a conservative think tank for which Abramoff was a board member.

=== Outcome ===
Abramoff, who has been described by his spokesman Andrew Blum as, "an especially strong supporter of Israel" and by reporter Michael Isikoff, quoting an anonymous Abramoff associate, as "a super-Zionist," diverted "money meant for inner-city kids" to Israeli West Bank to be used by a Jewish settlers in order to help them "fight the Palestinian intifada." Tribal donors were outraged by Abramoff's diversion of funds to Israeli settlers.

Investigators believe that more than $140,000 of Capital Athletic Foundation funds were actually used for "purchases of camouflage suits, sniper scopes, night-vision binoculars, a thermal imager and other material described in foundation records as 'security' equipment."

Juan Cole asserts, in critiquing The Hill report on this subject, "the Israeli army does not need shooting lessons from Ben-Zvi. The sniper lessons were for the colonists, practice for shooting Palestinians. The "high-school friend" is, apparently, "Abramoff's connection" to the Jewish West Bank settlement of Beitar Illit, "Schmuel Ben-Zvi, an American emigre who, the lobbyist told associates, was an old friend he knew from Los Angeles;" Ben-Zvi has denied knowing Abramoff.

The Foundation told the IRS it gave away more than $330,000 in grants in 2002 to four other charities. These charities have told investigators they never received the money.

On March 5, 2003, Paul Bond of The Hollywood Reporter announced the March 26, 2003, celebrity fundraiser "Interactive Spy Game Gala" to be held at the International Spy Museum in Washington, DC, "to raise about $300,000 for the Capital Athletic Foundation." Those who were planned to attend were NFL players Jerome Bettis and Brian Mitchell, opera singer Plácido Domingo, Media Commentators Tony Snow, Chris Matthews, and Brit Hume as well as several congressman such as Tom DeLay, Rick Santorum, and Dana Rohrabacher. However the event was canceled at the last minute.
