= Louis P. Sheldon =

American pastor and lobbyist (1934-2020)

Louis Philip Sheldon
- Born: June 11, 1934; Washington, DC, US
- Died: May 29, 2020 (aged 85); Orange County, California, US
- Education: Michigan State University BS History (1957); Princeton Theological Seminary MDiv Ministry (1960)
- Occupations: Presbyterian pastor (Note: served as Presbyterian pastor from 1960 - March 2012 (52 years)); Anglican priest (Note: served as Anglican priest from March 2012 - May 2020 (8 years))
- Known for: founder Traditional Values Coalition (Note: Traditional Values Coalition founded in 1980)
- Television: Fox News Channel; C-SPAN (Note: C-SPAN appearances spanning years 1991–2003)
- Title: President Traditional Values Coalition (Note: served as president 1980–2011); Chairman Traditional Values Coalition
- Spouse: Beverly Sheldon (m. 1957)
- Children: 4
- Parents: Rex Sheldon (father); Gertrude Sheldon (mother)
- Relatives: Andrea Sheldon Lafferty (daughter)

Louis Philip Sheldon (June 11, 1934 – May 29, 2020) was an American Presbyterian pastor, and then Anglican priest, and chairman of the social conservative organization, the Traditional Values Coalition.

He principally spoke and wrote about controversial social issues such as abortion, religious liberty, censorship, and public acceptance of homosexuality and same-sex marriage. He appeared as a guest commentator on the Fox News Channel, on programs such as Cavuto on Business, Hannity & Colmes, and The O'Reilly Factor. He appeared on C-SPAN, CNBC, MSNBC, CNN, and PBS. He was also featured in newspapers such as The New York Times, The Los Angeles Times, The Wall Street Journal, as well as on numerous national radio talk shows.

== Early life and education ==
Louis Philip Sheldon was born in 1934 in Washington, D.C., the son of Rex and Gertrude Sheldon. His father was raised in the English Protestant tradition, his mother as an Orthodox Jew. He became a Christian in his teens.

Sheldon earned a B.S. in history from Michigan State University in 1957. He received a M.Div. from Princeton Theological Seminary in 1960, the year he was also ordained a Presbyterian minister.

== Career ==
Sheldon served as a pastor in the 1960s and 1970s for churches in North Dakota and California, including Melodyland Christian Center in Anaheim, before striking out on his own as a lobbyist. He founded the Traditional Values Coalition (TVC) in 1980 as a non-denominational, grassroots movement.

In the 1980s and 1990s he wielded influence first in California and then in Washington, DC as a lobbyist for conservative causes, once considered among the ten most influential figures in conservative evangelical politics. Sheldon served as president of the organization from its founding (1980) until 2011.

Sheldon began his career as an ordained minister in the Presbyterian Church USA, and later moved to the more conservative Presbyterian Church in America. He left the Presbyterian ministry after 52 years and was ordained an Anglican priest in March 2012 at St. James Anglican Church (Newport Beach) California, which is part of the Anglican Church in North America. Sheldon was a 2013 delegate representing the Anglican Diocese of The Armed Forces and Chaplaincy to GAFCON II, the Global Anglican Future Conference, in Nairobi, Kenya.

== Criticism ==
TVC was designated an anti-gay hate group by the Southern Poverty Law Center (SPLC), citing TVC's use of "known falsehoods — claims about LGBT people that have been thoroughly discredited by scientific authorities — and repeated, groundless name-calling." Sheldon often responded to charges of homophobia and hate speech that he didn't hate gay people, but that he only wanted them to change.

Sheldon was also criticized in the early 2000s for his financial association with gambling lobbyists including Jack Abramoff. At the time, he responded by saying that "Politics makes strange bedfellows. The devil had that money long enough. It was about time we got our hands on it."

== Personal life and death ==
Sheldon and his wife, Beverly, married on August 24, 1957, and had four children.

He died May 29, 2020, in Orange County, California, aged 85.

== Bibliography ==
Sheldon authored one book:

- The Agenda: The Homosexual Plan to Change America. Frontline. 2005. ISBN 1-59185-796-1.

== See also ==
- Christian fundamentalism
- Christian right
- Hamilton Square Baptist Church protests
- Radical right (United States)
- C Street Center
