= Traditional Values Coalition =

American conservative Christian organization

- Abbreviation: TVC
- Founded: 1980 (46 years ago)
- Founder: Louis P. Sheldon
- Founded at: Anaheim, California; United States
- Type: nonprofit
- Tax ID no.: 33-0055498
- Legal status: 501(c)(4)
- Purpose: public education and lobbying
- Headquarters: 139 C St SE; Washington, DC 20003-1807; United States (Note: IRS Form-990 yr2021)
- Region served: United States
- President: Andrea Sheldon Lafferty (Note: Andrea Lafferty became president in 2011)
- Revenue: $1,270 (2021)
- Expenses: $44,555 (2021)

The Traditional Values Coalition (TVC) was an American conservative Christian organization. It was founded in 1980 at Anaheim California by Rev. Louis P. Sheldon to oppose LGBT rights. Sheldon's daughter, Andrea Sheldon Lafferty, was initially the executive director; after 2011 she served as president. TVC was influential in the 1980s and 1990s in lobbying for government policy based in Christian fundamentalism.

TVC was designated an anti-gay hate group by the Southern Poverty Law Center (SPLC), citing TVC's use of "known falsehoods—claims about LGBT people that have been thoroughly discredited by scientific authorities—and repeated, groundless name-calling."

The SPLC reported that the Traditional Values Coalition may have effectively ceased to function as of 2018. It was still filing IRS forms as of 2021.

== History and organization ==
Evangelical preacher Lou Sheldon was the California executive director of Anita Bryant's 1977 anti-gay Save Our Children campaign. Sheldon started his own organization in the 1980s to carry on his anti-LGBT advocacy, initially named the American Liberties Institute, later the California Coalition for Traditional Values, and finally the Traditional Values Coalition.

In 1984 TVC organized parents to oppose Project 10, a Los Angeles School District stay-in-school program for LGBT youth. TVC continued to battle the LA School District into the 1990s, but gradually expanded into a national organization with a Washington, D.C. headquarters.

TVC created a video called Gay Rights/Special Rights in 1993. The widely distributed video was a powerful tool in the anti-gay rights movement of the 1990s.

In the 1990s TVC claimed to represent over 43,000 Christian churches in the United States. Sheldon and his daughter Lafferty met with president US George W. Bush on eight occasions. TVC exerted considerable influence in the United States Congress in the 1990s.

Andrea Lafferty worked closely with her father at TVC from the late 1980s to the mid-2010s, becoming executive director by the year 2000 and gaining influence during the George W. Bush White House years from 2001 to 2008. Andrea Lafferty became president of the organization in 2011.

The organization was struggling to maintain relevance by the mid-2010s. In March 2018, the SPLC noted that the organization is "a ghost of its former self, if it exists at all. Its website disappeared from the internet last year, and its phone line is disconnected".

Lou Sheldon died in 2020. At the time of his death, Sheldon was suing the organization he founded, claiming that "TVC no longer functions as a legitimate lobby organization" but instead conducts fraudulent fundraising to benefit Andrea Lafferty and her husband.

=== Locations ===
TVC maintained an office in Anaheim California where it was founded. A Washington, D.C. office, run by Andrea Lafferty, provided lobbying access to the federal government.

==== Colorado ====
Barbara Sheldon was the chairwoman of TVC's Colorado branch. Sheldon complained that LGBT acceptance was "raising doubts in children's minds about religious prohibitions of homosexuality" and organized opposition to protecting Colorado school students from homophobic bullying. She was also on the executive board of Colorado for Family Values. Barbara Sheldon was not related to Lou Sheldon.

==== Nebraska ====
Cyndi Lamm was the director of the Nebraska branch. Lamm moved away from California, to Nebraska, in 1988 because TVC was unsuccessful in opposing LGBT rights in Los Angeles Schools. She believed that giving children information about homosexuality could cause them to become gay, and so chose to raise her family elsewhere. Lamm later ran unsuccessfully for mayor of Lincoln.

=== Video ===
The video Gay Rights/Special Rights: Inside the Homosexual Agenda made by TVC in 1993 attempted to depict the 1993 March on Washington for Lesbian, Gay and Bi Equal Rights and Liberation as "perverted". It contrasted the march unfavorably with the Civil Rights era March on Washington for Jobs and Freedom as an attempt drive a wedge between the LGBT and Black communities. The video was distributed widely to churches in America, in particular to African-American churches.

The video features Senator Trent Lott and William J. Bennett making anti-gay statements. Media scholars Linda Kintz and Julia Lesage describe the video as a "titillating peepshow that conceals a battering ram" against gay rights, and consider it a follow-up to the 1992 video The Gay Agenda.

== Policy positions ==
In some ways, the aims of the group were those of a Christian right. It did not provide formal position statements but outlined the traditional values it was fighting for as follows:

1. Right to life (against abortion and euthanasia but in favor of capital punishment)
2. Sexual fidelity in marriage and abstinence before marriage
3. Opposition to homosexuality and "other deviant sexual behaviors" (see below)
4. Opposition to pornography
5. Patriotism (supporting national boundaries, the armed forces, political participation, free enterprise, limited government, low taxes, and personal responsibility)
6. Opposition to "liberal" immigration reform without first securing the U.S.-Mexico border
7. Freedom for Christians' to attempt to convert non-Christians
8. Cleanness from addictive behaviors (with opposition to gambling, the legalization of addictive drugs, alcohol, and smoking)

The group then explained in paragraphs titled "Discrimination and Tolerance" and "Love and Hate" how it aimed to deal with accusations that its activities were based on hatred of those not following similar beliefs. Without stating what action should be taken, the organization maintained that "individuals may be free to pursue such behaviors as sodomy, but [that they] will not and cannot tolerate these behaviors." However, the TVC's stances against homosexuality and the LGBT rights movement were, comparatively, more confrontational than those of many groups with similar views. There were a number of smaller groups that take a harder line, most notably Westboro Baptist Church, which the TVC criticized for many years, likening it to a false flag operation. The gap between the TVC and other conservative groups was described by Winnie Stachelberg of the pro-LGBT Human Rights Campaign as follows: "They're out there every day supporting discrimination against gay people on nearly every issue, and you don't see that so much from other groups." The Coalition took this as a compliment. By comparison, Jerry Falwell stated in his later years, "Civil rights for all Americans...gay, straight, et cetera, is not a liberal or a conservative value. It's an American value that I would think that we pretty much all agree on."

The TVC suggested that homosexuals posed a threat of child molestation; claiming they "have long sought unrestricted access to children for recruitment purposes" and are more willing than others on the right to use the word sodomy in reference to gay men. Historically, the group at one time called for "cities of refuge" to keep AIDS patients from infecting the general population.

Lafferty's response to a Gallup poll suggesting a tilt in public opinion towards gay rights was this: "Jesus didn't ask for a 'show of hands' at the Sermon on the Mount. We, His followers, should not ask America to vote on which of his teachings they choose to obey."

== Hate group ==
The Southern Poverty Law Center (SPLC) enumerated false statements made by TVC, including the claim that gay people travel door-to-door to steal American children and transform them into homosexuals. The SPLC also notes that TVC has a history of Islamophobic statements. Because of this, SPLC classified TVC as a hate group beginning in 2008. The SPLC removed the designation in 2018 because the group appeared to be inactive or defunct.

== Christian Seniors Association ==
The TVC operated a subsidiary under the name of "Christian Seniors Association" under the leadership of James Lafferty, the husband of Andrea Sheldon Lafferty. It aims to be a conservative alternative to the AARP. It attracted some attention for distributing financial appeals that are designed to be confused with census material.

== Jack Abramoff ==
Louis Sheldon was an associate of Jack Abramoff, the Republican lobbyist jailed for influence peddling. Despite the group's stated opposition to gambling, Sheldon lobbied members of the US Congress to kill the Internet Gambling Prohibition Act. Abramoff directed his client, eLottery, to pay $25,000 to the Traditional Values Coalition.

The group has also been linked to the Mariana Islands worker abuse scandal, as it was used by Abramoff to pay for the trip of Representative Bob Schaffer to visit the island. The Denver Post reported that the TVC paid the $13,000 travel bill for the trip organized by Abramoff's lobbying firm.

Abramoff's lobbying team would prepare questions and "factual backup" for friendly lawmakers. Trips to the island for congressmen and staff would be a key tool to "build permanent friends", the memo said.

The congressional junkets to the Mariana Islands were designed to build support in Congress among Republican lawmakers to block labor and immigration legislation for the islands, which had been found to harbor squalid working conditions and abusive labor practices.

== See also ==
- Christian fundamentalism
- Christian right
- Radical right (United States)
- List of organizations designated by the Southern Poverty Law Center as anti-gay hate groups
