= Michael Scanlon =

American lobbyist and convicted felon

Michael Scanlon (also known as Sean Scanlon) is a former communications director for Rep. Tom DeLay, lobbyist, and public relations executive who has pleaded guilty to corruption charges related to the Jack Abramoff lobbying scandal. He is currently assisting in the investigation of his former partners Abramoff, Grover Norquist and Ralph Reed by separate state and federal grand jury investigations related to the defrauding of American Indian tribes and corruption of public officials.

In addition to the allegation of dishonest dealing arising from the consulting contracts themselves, Abramoff and Scanlon are accused of illegally giving favors to senior Republicans Tom DeLay, Conrad Burns, John Doolittle, and Bob Ney. In 2005, Scanlon pleaded guilty to conspiring to bribe a member of Congress and other public officials. On February 11, 2011, he was sentenced to 20 months in federal prison and 300 hours of community service.

== Early career ==
In 1994, Scanlon worked as press secretary for Republican U.S. Senate candidate Ross Pierpont of Maryland. Pierpont failed to gain the party's nomination. Scanlon later acted as a press secretary to Michael Patrick Flanagan (R-IL), who was elected to the former congressional seat of Dan Rostenkowski (D-IL) in 1994, Fred Heineman (R-NC) in 1996, and then Bob Riley (R-AL), who later became Governor of Alabama. Scanlon later became an aide to congressman Tom DeLay (R-TX), and rose in the ranks to become the Majority Whip's communication director.

== Scanlon leaves Capitol Hill ==
Michael Scanlon resigned his position as communication director for Tom DeLay in March 2000, while DeLay was being lobbied by Abramoff to vote against the Internet Gambling Prohibition Act. Shortly thereafter, Scanlon was hired by the Washington law firm of Preston Gates Ellis and Rouvelas Meeds, and joined Abramoff's lobbying team.

== Scanlon, Abramoff and SunCruz Casinos ==
In February 2000, Abramoff became involved in the purchase of SunCruz Casinos, a Florida-based cruise line which ran "cruises to nowhere" into international waters, where gambling was allowed on board. Scanlon was not a partner in the deal but assisted in the purchase, by contacting Neil G. Volz, an old friend from his time on Capitol Hill and Chief of Staff to Rep. Bob Ney (R-OH). Volz aided Scanlon in getting Ney to place comments in the Congressional Record to aid Abramoff in purchasing the business. Abramoff was accused and later pleaded guilty in 2005 to charges of wire fraud, stemming from a forged wire transfer showing a non-existent down payment used to obtain financing for the purchase.

== Scanlon and Tribal lobbying ==
As of September 11, 2000, Scanlon was one of the lobbyists assigned to Abramoff's team lobbying on behalf of the Saginaw Chippewa Indian Tribe of Michigan. After Abramoff left Preston Gates and went to Greenberg Traurig in January 2001, Scanlon formed his own public relations firm, Capitol Campaign Strategies (along with the dummy organizations American International Center, Atlantic Research Analysis, and Scanlon Gould Public Affairs). Abramoff and Scanlon used the firm to bilk tribal clients for millions of dollars in fees. Abramoff directed clients to use Scanlon's firm for political campaign services, without disclosing his own relationship with Scanlon. Scanlon's firm would then only perform part of the campaign services billed for, and would split the excess money received with Abramoff in a scheme known to the two as "Gimme Five".

Private communications revealed as a result of the Congressional enquiry into Scanlon and Abramoff's consulting business demonstrate a contemptuous attitude to both clients and supporters. Indian Clients were referred to as "troglodytes" and "monkeys", while Christian Conservatives were called gullible "wackos" who could be manipulated to vote on demand:

The wackos get their information through the Christian right, Christian radio, mail, the internet and telephone trees ... Simply put, we want to bring out the wackos to vote against something and make sure the rest of the public lets the whole thing slip past them.

Scanlon also emailed colleagues, saying:

This whole thing about not kicking someone when they are down is BS - Not only do you kick him - You kick him until he passes out - then beat him over the head with a baseball bat - then roll him up in an old rug - and throw him off a cliff into the pounding surf below!!!!!

== Criminal charges ==
On November 18, 2005, in a one-count criminal information filed by the US Justice Department, Scanlon was charged with conspiring with another lobbyist, who was identified only as "Lobbyist A", believed to be Abramoff. That same day Scanlon agreed to testify against Abramoff in any future criminal case involving his ex-partner. On November 21, 2005, in proceedings before Federal District Judge Ellen Segal Huvelle, Scanlon pleaded guilty to conspiring to bribe a member of Congress and other public officials. Under the plea agreement, Scanlon will repay $19.6 million to his former Indian tribe lobbying clients.

== Fictional portrayals ==
Scanlon was portrayed by Barry Pepper in the 2010 film Casino Jack.

== Sources ==
- Hampson, Rick (Associated Press). "They find public resentment no joking matter - Lawyers take stand to lift negative image" The Philadelphia Inquirer, August 9, 1993.
- Johnson, Steve. "Mr. Flanagan Goes to Washington - A Young Upstart Comes to Grips With His role and his sudden renown" Chicago Tribune, January 15, 1995.
