= Internet Gambling Prohibition Act =

The Internet Gambling Prohibition Act (IGPA) was a 1999 bill in the US Senate to ban Internet gambling. Passage of the bill was defeated, in large part, by the lobbying efforts of Jack Abramoff. The bill was supported by Christian conservative groups such as Focus on the Family, Moral Majority, and the Christian Coalition.

A new version of this legislation was attached to the SAFE Port Act and became law in 2006.

In 1999, eLottery, inc. hired Jack Abramoff's lobbying firm, Preston Gates & Ellis, to represent their effort to block the bill. ELottery, an Internet-based firm, intended to sell state lottery tickets online, and this business venture was threatened by the IGPA. Abramoff recruited Ralph Reed, his College Republicans cohort, and Rev. Louis P. Sheldon of the Traditional Values Coalition to oppose the legislation. Although Reed was a former director of the Christian Coalition which now supported the bill, Abramoff suggested a strategy for opposing the bill on the basis of exceptions in the bill for horse racing and jai-alai. Reed and Sheldon later claimed that they did not know that they were effectively doing this work on behalf of a gambling corporation. These claims contradict email exchanges between Abramoff and Reed which discuss eLottery and its parent company, eLot in 2000 and 2001.

In June 2000, Susan Ralston helped Jack Abramoff pass checks from eLottery to Lou Sheldon's Traditional Values Coalition (TVC) and also to Grover Norquist's Americans for Tax Reform (ATR), en route to Ralph Reed's company, Century Strategies

"I have 3 checks from elot: (1) 2 checks for $80K payable to ATR and (2) 1 check to TVC for $25K," wrote Ralston, "Let me know exactly what to do next. Send to Grover? Send to Rev. Lou?"

Abramoff directed his client, eLottery, to direct $25,000 in payments to Sheldon's Traditional Values Coalition, and also checks totalling $160,000 to Grover Norquist's Americans for Tax Reform. Abramoff then directed Norquist to receive his checks and write another check for $150,000 to Faith and Family Alliance, a Delaware-based political advocacy group started by Reed. The check was received by Robin Vanderwall, then Director of Faith and Family Alliance, who claimed Reed called him and directed him to write a check for an equal amount to Century Strategies, Reed's political consultancy. "I was running a shell", Vanderwall later claimed. "I regret having had anything to do with it."

Abramoff was working closely with Tony Rudy, then Majority Whip Tom DeLay's Chief of Staff. In numerous emails, Rudy delivered inside information on the status of discussions of IGPA within the House Republican Caucus, and suggested strategies to defeat it. DeLay was normally a staunch opponent of gambling, but had not taken a position on the bill.

Reverend Sheldon worked publicly to oppose the bill, holding numerous press conferences. On July 13, 2000, Sheldon met privately with DeLay. DeLay later announced his opposition to the bill.

While the bill was under consideration in the House, a letter began circulating among congressman opposing the legislation, signed by Florida Governor Jeb Bush. The letter caused confusion amongst the Republican Caucus, but was later shown to be a forgery.

Abramoff's firm had hired Shandwick Worldwide, based in Tampa, Florida to lobby Jeb Bush and other leaders for letters showing opposition to IGPA. Months later, a Florida man, Matthew Blair, told authorities in a plea bargain agreement that he was hired by Shandwick to obtain the letter, but created a forgery when he failed to get a real one. Shandwick denied any complicity in the forgery.

DeLay voted against IGPA, and used his powers as Majority Whip to place the bill on the suspension calendar, a House procedural maneuver which bans amendments and limits debate. The bill's sponsor, Robert Goodlatte (R-VA) agreed, as he expected the bill to pass.

The bill failed to meet the two-thirds majority required by the suspension calendar, and was rejected on July 18.

The bill's original supporters, such as James Dobson's Focus on the Family, immediately demanded that the House leadership revive the bill. Abramoff realized that he would not be able to muster support to reject the bill in an ordinary majority vote. Abramoff used Sheldon to target 10 Republican House members in vulnerable districts, using Sheldon to carry out a media campaign and Reed to carry out a direct-mail campaign accusing the members of being 'soft on gambling' if they supported the bill. In a fax to eLottery on August 18, Abramoff wrote, "please get me a check as soon as possible for $150,000 made payable to American Marketing Inc. This is the company Ralph [Reed] is using."

Abramoff also directed eLottery to write a check for $25,000 to Toward Tradition, a Seattle, Washington-based foundation formerly chaired by Abramoff, and then chaired by Rabbi Daniel Lapin. Toward Tradition later employed Tony Rudy's wife, Lisa Rudy for work allegedly related to an Interfaith conference to be held in September 2000. Lapin claimed that Lisa Rudy's company, Liberty Consulting, was paid over $25,000 for "ground work" related to the conference.

Toward Tradition also received $25,000 in funding from Abramoff's client Magazine Publishers of America. According to the MPA, this donation was given at the direction of another Preston Gates employee, not Abramoff. Tony Rudy had also aided Abramoff in lobbying Tom DeLay on a postal-rate increase opposed by the magazine publishers. The FBI interviewed Toward Tradition in 2005 regarding this apparent money laundering.

Due to the campaigns manufactured by Reed and Sheldon, the targeted members reported to DeLay's office that they were being pressured by constituents to vote against the bill. Tony Rudy used his position as Chief of Staff to exaggerate these concerns in reports to Tom DeLay. DeLay eventually convinced other members of the House Republican leadership that passing the bill could cost the Republican caucus 4 seats, at which point the other leaders agreed not to put the bill to a vote in that session of Congress.
