= Greenberg Traurig =

American law firm

Greenberg Traurig, LLP
- No. of offices: 51
- No. of attorneys: Approximately 3200 (as of 2026)
- Major practice areas: Restructuring & Special Situations, Litigation, Securities Litigation, Products Liability & Mass Torts, Corporate, Intellectual Property & Technology, Data, Privacy & Cybersecurity, Entertainment, Media & Sports, Real Estate, Tax, Estate Planning, Trust & Estate Administration, International Trade, Government Law & Policy, Public Finance & Infrastructure, Environmental, Land Use, Private Wealth Services, Private Equity, Energy & Natural Resources, Mergers & Acquisitions
- Key people: Brian Duffy (CEO); Michael Baum (co-president); Richard A. Rosenbaum (executive chairman); Ernest LaMont Greer (co-president); Brad D. Kaufmann (senior chairman); Cesar Alvarez (senior chairman); Matthew B. Gorson (senior chairman)
- Revenue: $2.9+ Billion USD (2025)
- Date founded: 1967
- Founder: Mel Greenberg, Larry J. Hoffman, and Robert H. Traurig
- Website: gtlaw.com

Greenberg Traurig is an American law firm founded in Miami in 1967 by Mel Greenberg, Larry J. Hoffman, and Robert H. Traurig.

As of 2025, it is the eighth-largest law firm in the United States. The firm has 51 locations in the U.S., Europe, the Middle East, Latin America, and Asia, and approximately 3,200 attorneys worldwide as of 2026. Its 2025 revenue was over $2.9 billion.

Its largest office is in New York City, and clients have included Diane Von Furstenberg Studios, Conde Nast Publications, The New Yorker, New Yorker staff, former New York City Mayor Rudy Giuliani, and the plastics industry.

== History ==
=== 20th century ===
In the 1970s, Greenberg, Traurig and Hoffman became Greenberg, Traurig, Hoffman, Lipoff, and Quentel with the addition of attorneys Norman H. Lipoff and Albert D. Quentel as named shareholders. Former Florida governor Reubin Askew was a named shareholder in the early 1980s while he also sought the Democratic nomination for president.

Larry Hoffman became managing partner of the firm in 1991, at which point the firm began to expand nationwide, beginning with the opening of an office in New York City. Further expansion followed in 1999, with offices opened in Chicago, Boston, Los Angeles, and Wilmington, Delaware.

In 1996, the firm established the Greenberg Traurig Fellowship Foundation to support attorneys working with public interest groups. By 2002, the foundation was the largest sponsor of Equal Justice Works Fellowships in the U.S. In 2013, the foundation was renamed the Greenberg Traurig Holly Skolnick Fellowship Foundation in honor of the late Holly Skolnick, a Greenberg Traurig shareholder who helped establish the foundation and served as its president.

=== 21st century ===
In 2000, the firm doubled the size of its New York City office by acquiring the local office of Graham & James.

In July 2009, Greenberg Traurig opened an office in London under the name of Greenberg Traurig Maher LLP, since renamed to Greenberg Traurig, LLP. The London office is currently located in The Shard skyscraper.

According to OpenSecrets, Greenberg Traurig was one of the top law firms contributing to federal candidates during the 2012 election cycle, donating $1.49 million, 50.2% to Democrats. By comparison, during that same period Akin Gump Strauss Hauer & Feld donated $2.56 million, 66% to Democrats, while oil conglomerate ExxonMobil donated $2.66 million, 88% to Republicans. Since 1990, Greenberg Traurig contributed $11.2 million to federal campaigns.

Between 2011 and 2013, Greenberg Traurig participated in the American Bar Association's National Pro Bono Week.

In 2013, the firm launched a residency program to hire associates who are not recruited in traditional on-campus interviews by allowing them to spend up to a third of their billable hours in training for a one-year trial period.

In 2016, Brian Duffy became CEO. In July 2018, founding member Robert H. Traurig died at age 93 in Miami.

In 2020, Greenberg Traurig became the first law firm certified to be net carbon neutral by the Center for Resource Solutions.

=== 2023-present ===
In March 2023, Greenberg Traurig announced an affiliation with Khalid Al-Thebity Law Firm in Riyadh, Saudi Arabia. In April 2024, GT became fully incorporated in the Kingdom of Saudi Arabia. It later announced the establishment if a regional headquarters in Riyadh and now operates as Greenberg Traurig through Greenberg Traurig Khalid Al-Thebity Law Firm. This was the firm's second office in the Middle East, following a location in Tel Aviv.

On Sept. 11, 2025, company co-founder, Larry Hoffman, passed away.

== Finances ==
Revenue Chart
Year	Revenue	Sources
2018	$1.477 billion	
2019	$1.556 billion	
2020	$1.73 billion	
2021	$2+ billion	
2022	$2.17 billion	
2023	$2.3 billion	
2024	$2.618 billion	
2025	$2.9+ billion	

== Awards and rankings ==
It is the ninth largest law firm in the United States by headcount and ranks in the top 20 of the Am Law 100 by gross revenue, in the top 10 of the NLJ 500, and in the top 25 of the Global 200. Greenberg Traurig is among the 23 firms most recommended by general counsels in 2025, according to BTI Consulting Group. The firm earned top marks on the survey for trust and relationship management. The firm has the most attorneys listed by Best Lawyers in America from 2008-2026.

Law Firm Rankings
Year	AM Law 100 Rank	Global 200 Rank	NLJ 500 Rank
2021	16	21	9
2020	14	19	9
2019	14	19	10
2018	14	19	N/A
2017	14	19	N/A
2016	14	20	N/A
2010	15	20	N/A

== Notable attorneys ==
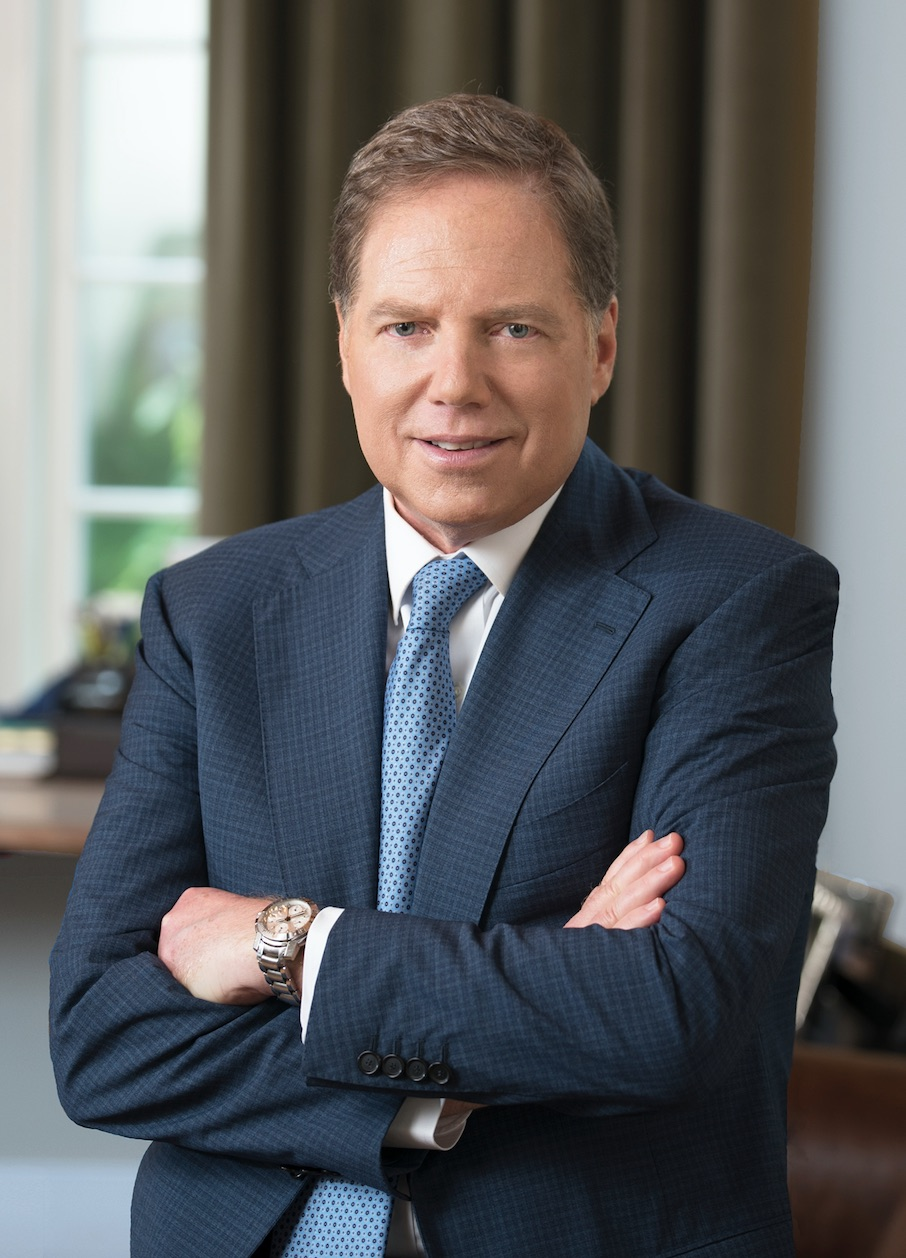
Geoffrey Berman

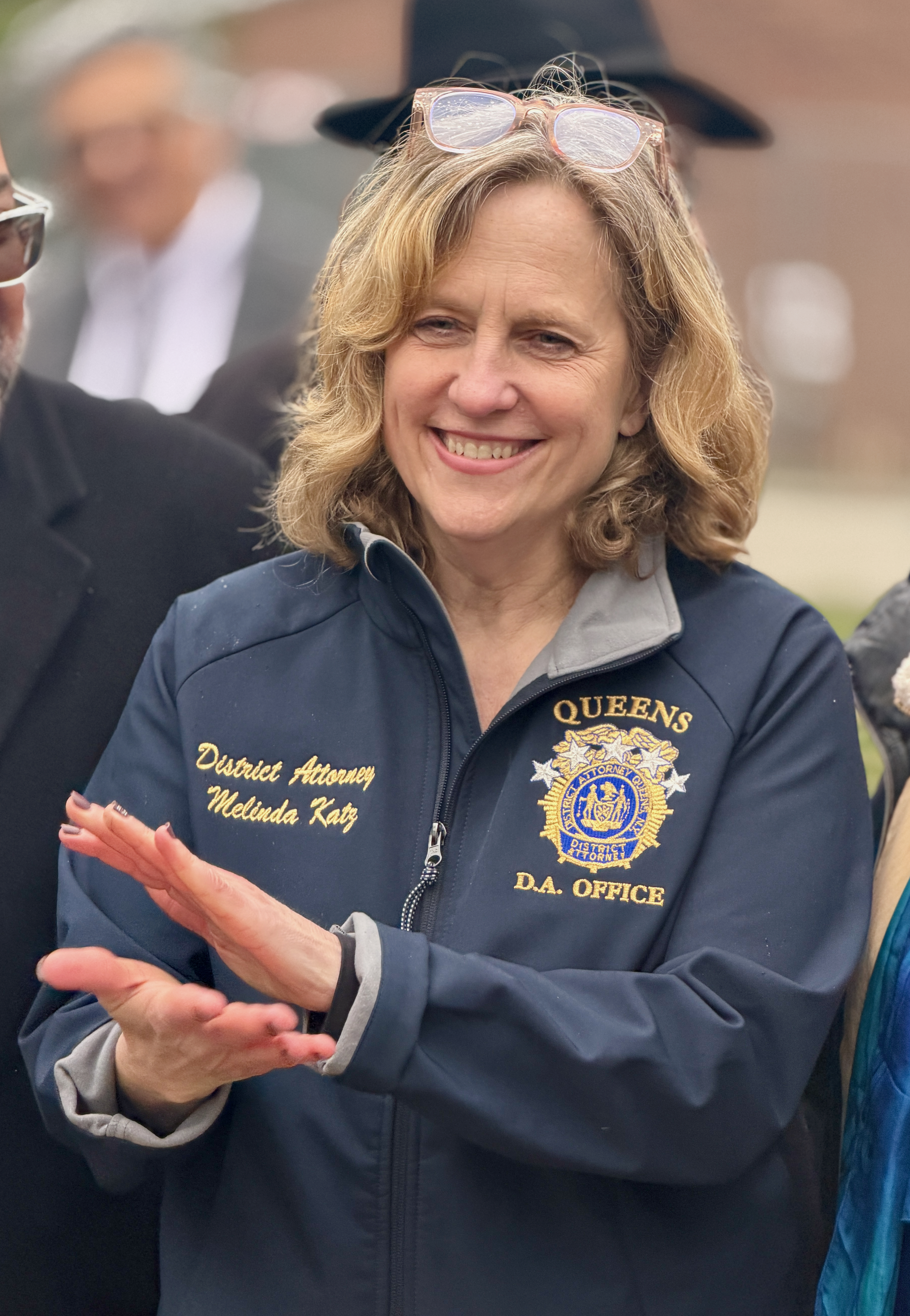
Melinda Katz

- John D. Altenburg (born 1944), lawyer for the U.S. Army and retired major general
- Reubin O'D. Askew (1928-2014), attorney, Governor of Florida, U.S. Trade Representative, member of the Florida House of Representatives and Florida Senate
- Geoffrey Berman (born 1959). attorney, U.S. Attorney for the Southern District of New York
- Robert Charrow (born 1944), lawyer and government official
- Carmen Beauchamp Ciparick (born 1942), associate judge on the New York Court of Appeals
- Sam Dubbin (born 1955), lawyer, government worker, and Holocaust Survivors' rights advocate
- Rudy Giuliani (born 1944), politician and disbarred lawyer, 108th mayor of New York City, U.S. Associate Attorney General, and U.S. Attorney for the Southern District of New York.
- Ernest Istook (born 1950), lawyer and politician, member of the U.S. House of Representatives from Oklahoma
- Melinda Katz (born 1965), Queens County District Attorney, 19th Borough President of Queens, member of the New York City Council and the New York State Assembly
- Henry Latimer (1938–2005), judge
- Alberto J. Mora (born 1951), general counsel of the Navy
- Susan Phillips Read (born 1947), judge on New York State Court of Appeals
- Samuel K. Skinner (born 1938), politician, lawyer, and businessman, served as U.S. Secretary of Transportation, White House Chief of Staff, and the U.S. Attorney for the Northern District of Illinois.
- Robert H. Traurig (1925–2018), lawyer and businessman who was one of three founders of Greenberg Traurig in 1967.
- Kevin Warren (born 1963), attorney and sports executive; president and chief executive officer of the Chicago Bears of the National Football League

== Controversies ==
=== Abramoff lobbying scandals ===
In January 2001, lobbyist Jack Abramoff joined Greenberg Traurig and assembled "Team Abramoff", a lobbying team implicated in the Jack Abramoff Indian lobbying scandal. Greenberg Traurig cooperated with federal prosecutors and the Senate Committee on Indian Affairs during subsequent investigations.

Senator John McCain, committee chairman at the time, said, "I want the record to reflect that, consistent with their professional obligations, Greenberg Traurig and its counsel have always been responsive to the committee's requests, always made themselves available to answer questions, and have always conducted themselves with dignity and professionalism in these trying circumstances."

=== Chicago patronage ===
In 2001, Victor Reyes, who headed the Hispanic Democratic Organization, joined Greenberg Traurig to lead its Chicago lobbying practice. Federal prosecutors later alleged Reyes's office was central to a patronage scheme to funnel city jobs to campaign workers for Richard M. Daley. Reyes resigned from Greenberg Traurig in August 2005 and was named as a "co-schemer," but was not criminally charged.

=== Hamilton Bank ===
In June 2006, Greenberg Traurig agreed to pay $7.6 million to the Federal Deposit Insurance Corporation and $750,000 to the Office of the Comptroller of the Currency to settle allegations regarding its work with the now-defunct Hamilton Bank in Miami.

=== Tax shelter kickbacks ===
In November 2006, Jay I. Gordon, the former chairman of Greenberg Traurig's tax practice, resigned from the New York State Bar Association and was disbarred for taking over $1.2 million in kickbacks on tax shelters that he had recommended to wealthy clients of the firm. Jay I. Gordon passed away in 2018.

=== New York state real estate ===
In November 2008, a New York state court refused to dismiss a suit alleging that Robert J. Ivanhoe, head of its real estate group, disregarded his "legal and fiduciary duties" by taking a personal financial stake in a competitor to a client that had invested in a multibillion-dollar real estate venture. The former client sued Ivanhoe and Greenberg Traurig in April 2008 for breach of fiduciary duty, aiding and abetting breach of fiduciary duty, tortious interference with prospective economic damages, and malpractice. Greenberg Traurig responded that the allegations were "without merit" and that it would appeal the ruling.

=== Trademark infringement ===
Greenberg Traurig was named in a civil action suit brought by Richard and Catherine Snyder: Snyder et al v. Greenberg Traurig, LLP et al. The suit was ultimately dismissed.

=== Insider trading investigation ===
In 2014, the Securities and Exchange Commission (SEC) looked into insider trader allegations between United States House Ways and Means Subcommittee on Health staff director Brian Sutter and Mark Hayes, a lobbyist at Greenberg Traurig. After two years of litigation and its 2nd Circuit appeal of the subpoena in December 2015, the Committee finally dropped its opposition to the order requested by the SEC.

=== Rudy Giuliani ===
In May 2018, the firm parted ways with Rudy Giuliani over his allegations that he would pay his clients' adversaries hush money in a manner consistent with the Stormy Daniels affair. Giuliani suggested that such payments were common, even without the knowledge of the clients.

=== Frank Butselaar ===
In February 2025, a tax lawyer and one-time partner of the firm, Frank Butselaar, was sentenced to 30 months in federal prison for helping wealthy clients conceal tens of millions of dollars from the IRS.

=== 2026 data breach ===
In September 2026, Greenberg Traurig confirmed that an outside party had obtained a limited number of its documents and published them on the dark web. The firm stated that its own systems had not been breached and that it continued to operate without interruption, and said it had informed the small number of clients whose material was affected.

The firm lodged breach notifications with state regulators, among them the attorney general of Vermont, whose filing recorded the exposure of Social Security information, and with authorities in California, Texas and other states. A notice sent to one affected California resident identified the person's name, contact details, date of birth and Social Security number among the data involved.

Two proposed class actions were subsequently brought in the United States District Court for the Southern District of New York. Four plaintiffs filed the first, Addison v. Greenberg Traurig, earlier in September 2026, and a New York resident filed a second, Hancock v. Greenberg Traurig, on 20 September. The later complaint alleged that the firm had held sensitive personal information in connection with legal services it had provided and had failed to safeguard names, Social Security numbers and contact details; it characterised the August intrusion as avoidable and sought to represent thousands of others in a similar position. Neither filing stated whether the plaintiffs had been clients of the firm, which did not comment on the litigation at the time.

The disclosures came amid a broader increase in attacks on the legal profession. A report published in March 2026 by BakerHostetler recorded that its digital assets and data management groups had responded to close to 60 incidents at law firms over the preceding year, roughly double the figure for the year before. Other firms that reported breaches during the same period included Quinn Emanuel, Herbert Smith Freehills Kramer and Goodwin Procter, while WilmerHale was sued in federal court in Washington in July 2026 over an alleged data-security failure.
