= List of trips funded by Jack Abramoff =

The following is a list of trips for politicians, lobbyists, and staffers funded by Jack Abramoff.

The picture at right (taken at Carnoustie) for the trip to St. Andrews, the famed Scottish golf course. This trip was paid for by Abramoff at a cost of $160,000. Congressman Bob Ney's then chief of staff, William Heaton, admitted "falsifying his and Ney's financial disclosure forms in 2002 and 2003 to keep gifts secret. For example, Ney's forms said the Scotland trip was paid for by the National Center for Public Policy Research so he could meet with Scottish parliamentarians, though the Scottish Parliament was not in session...."

== Trips ==
Date	Location	Participants	Details
December 4–12, 1996	Saipan	Ed Buckham, Tony Rudy, Jeff Shockey	Abramoff paid at least $3000; he was reimbursed by Preston Gates & Ellis, reimbursed in turn by the Marianas government
New Year's, 1997	Saipan	Tom DeLay (R-TX) with his wife and daughter	Stayed for free at beachside resort
January 1997	Saipan	James Clyburn (D-SC) and Bennie Thompson (D-MS)	Clyburn and Thompson invited by National Security Caucus Foundation, who was paid by Preston Gates & Ellis and told that the government had paid for it
Six days, 1997	Russia	Tom DeLay, Ed Buckham, Jack Abramoff, lobbyist Julius "Jay" Kaplan, Amy Ridenour of NCPPR and her husband, journalist Bart Adams, Jesse Helms aide James P. Lucier, David Lowe (National Endowment for Democracy)	About $60,000 funneled by Naftasib executives Marina Nevskaya and Alexander Koulakovsky through Bahamas company Chelsea Enterprises, which paid the National Center for Public Policy Research.
late May-early June 2000	London/Scotland	Tom DeLay, Tony Rudy, Ed Buckham, Susan Hirschmann	Airfare charged to Abramoff's credit card, expenses charged to Ed Buckham's credit card; supposedly organized by National Center for Public Policy Research
February 21, 1999	Marshall Islands	Official congressional delegation led by Don Young (R-AK)	Also in delegation: John Doolittle (R-CA), Ken Calvert (R-CA), Dana Rohrabacher (R-CA), delegates of Guam, American Samoa, Virgin Islands and 8 staffers. Preston Gates sued the Marshall Islands to get reimbursed for the trip.
January 2001	Super Bowl XXXV, Tampa	Conrad Burns chief of staff Will Brooke, Bob Ney chief of staff Neil Volz, Burns appropriations staffer Ryan Thomas, Tom DeLay staffers	Funded by SunCruz Casinos; Brooke and Volz later joined Team Abramoff
2001	Korea	Tom DeLay, DeLay's wife, Ed Buckham
July 2001	Puerto Rico	John Lopez (John Doolittle chief of staff)	Paid for by Greenberg Traurig in violation of House ethics rules
August 3–11, 2002	Scotland & London	Bob Ney, Ralph Reed, David Safavian, Jack Abramoff, Ney's chief of staff, William Heaton, House Administration Committee lawyer Paul D. Vinovich, lobbyist Michael Williams	golfing trip paid for by Capital Athletic Foundation at a cost of over $130,000—this trip was named in Safavian's indictment because he had falsely claimed Abramoff had no business before the GSA at the time of the trip
January 2003	Fiesta Bowl, Tempe, Arizona	Bob Ney and staffers	named in Neil Volz's plea
May 9–12, 2003	New Orleans	Bob Ney, William Heaton, Neil Volz, and another lobbyist	named in Neil Volz's and Bob Ney's plea; $7200 paid for by Greenberg Traurig
August 9–14, 2003	Scotland	Tom Feeney (R-FL), Ralph Reed, Mark Zachares, Bob R. Brooks Jr., chief of staff to Rep. Jim McCrery (R-La.)	paid for by Abramoff though supposedly by National Center for Public Policy Research
August 24–27, 2003	Lake George, New York	Bob Ney, William Heaton, another Ney staffer, Neil Volz, and another lobbyist	named in Neil Volz's plea and Bob Ney's plea; $3500 paid for by Volz and reimbursed by Greenberg Traurig

== Sources ==
- "Abramoff associate Michael Scanlon". Thinkprogress.org.
- "DeLay's Lavish Island Getaway". ABC News. 10 November 2005.
- R. Jeffrey Smith (May 4, 2005). "Democrats' Travel Costs Linked to Lobbyist". Washington Post. p. A01.
