= Monetary influence of Jack Abramoff =

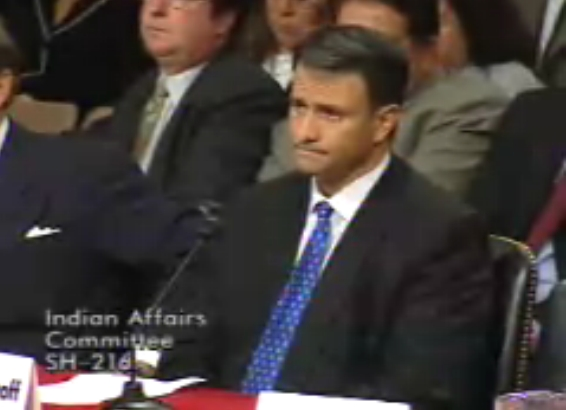
Jack Abramoff in January 2006

The monetary influence of Jack Abramoff ran deep in Washington, as Jack Abramoff spent millions of dollars to influence and entertain both Republican and Democratic politicians. Abramoff had a reputation for largesse considered exceptional, even by Washington, D.C. standards. In addition to offering Republican members of Congress expensive free meals at his restaurant, Signatures, Abramoff maintained four skyboxes at major sports arenas for political entertaining at a cost of over $1 million a year. Abramoff hosted a number of fundraisers at these skyboxes including events for Republican politicians publicly opposed to gambling, such as John Doolittle. Abramoff gave over $260,000 in personal contributions to Republican candidates, politicians, and organizations, and funded multiple trips for politicians and staffers and gave none to Democrats.

From 2000 to 2006, funds and Leadership PACs of multiple Republican candidates for Congress. Under his guidance, his Indian tribe clients loosened their traditional ties to the Democratic Party, giving Republicans two-thirds of the $2.9 million they donated to federal candidates since 2001. He raised $100,000 for the reelection of George W. Bush, making him a Bush Pioneer. Abramoff and his wife gave $10,000 to the Bush-Cheney Recount Fund, shortly before Abramoff joined Greenberg Traurig, which forgave over $314,000 in legal fees incurred by the Bush Campaign in the 2000 Florida election recount.

Of the approximately $85 million in tribal money entrusted to Abramoff, his employers, or his related organizations (see Jack Abramoff Indian lobbying scandal for more), over $4.4 million since 1999 were directed to at least 250 members of Congress, primarily Republicans in leadership positions or on relevant committees, and Democrats with standing connections to Native American interests (in a 2:1 GOP ratio). These contributions have since become tainted by their association with Abramoff's criminal behavior.

Abramoff was associated with Tom DeLay's and Grover Norquist's K Street Project to bring Republican dominance to Washington lobbying.

== Skyboxes and St. Andrews ==
Through the front company Sports Suites LLC, Abramoff owned skyboxes at MCI Center and Camden Yards, and two at FedExField. Between 1999 and 2003, Abramoff hosted 72 events for members of Congress, all but eight for Republicans.

On May 7, 2000, while Abramoff was actively lobbying against the Internet Gambling Prohibition Act in the House of Representatives, Tom DeLay attended a performance by the Three Tenors in a skybox at Washington's MCI Center. Several major donors to DeLay's Texans for a Republican Majority PAC were also invited. It was later revealed that the skybox was leased and paid for by Jack Abramoff, at an estimated cost of $3,600–7,500. Although Federal law at the time did not require disclosure or reimbursement of this sort of gift-giving from a lobbyist to a PAC, the law was changed several months later, and the incident was cited in later criticisms of DeLay's acceptance of gifts.

On May 25, DeLay departed on a 10-day trip to Scotland together with Abramoff and DeLay's aides Tony Rudy and Susan Hirschmann. In documents filed after the trip as required by House rules, DeLay claimed that the purpose of the trip was primarily "educational", to hold meetings with Conservative leaders in Britain, including former Prime Minister Margaret Thatcher, and that the total cost of the trip was $28,106. The filings indicated that the trip was being paid for by the "National Center for Public Policy Research", a think tank then chaired by Jack Abramoff.

On the same date as DeLay's trip departure, Abramoff clients eLottery and the Mississippi Choctaw sent checks totaling $50,000 to the National Center for Public Policy Research. eLottery and the tribe both later claimed that they were unaware that the money was intended to pay for a trip.

Details later emerged that parts of the trip were paid for directly on Abramoff's credit card, and a card belonging to Edwin A. Buckham, another prominent lobbyist. Although the trip did include a meeting with Margaret Thatcher, according to detailed bills leaked to the Washington Post, the trip also included golf at the exclusive St. Andrews Golf Resort, theater tickets, and "superior" room accommodations at the London Four Seasons. The total cost of the trip was estimatedGambling interests paid for House leader’s trip to Britain at $70,000, of which approximately $12,000 was reimbursed to Abramoff by Preston Gates.

The length of the trip, expense, source of funding, and activities of the trip are significant as House ethics rules at the time prevented representatives from accepting gifts from private parties if it would "create the appearance of using public office for private gain."

== Justice Department investigation ==
These actions by Abramoff ignited an investigation by the Justice Department to examine widespread claims and allegations of corruption of law-makers connected with Jack Abramoff. The allegations of corruption were later shown to be true, and resulted in a politician (Rep. Bob Ney, (R-OH)) getting convicted for accepting bribes from Abramoff. Abramoff also plead guilty to tax fraud and bribery of public officials in January 2006.

== Politicians who have received direct contributions from Abramoff ==
FEC records show that Abramoff gave $172,933 for Republican candidates, $88,985 to Republican causes and nothing to Democratic candidates or organizations. A compilation of the complete FEC record and its analysis of contributions made by Jack Abramoff, only, independently confirmed the latter claim. Some of the most prominent who have received such contributions and who may have other connections to Abramoff include:

President George W Bush (R)

As a Bush Pioneer, Abramoff raised over $100,000 for the George W. Bush reelection campaign in addition to the $6,000 which he personally contributed.

Although the White House insists President Bush never met Jack Abramoff outside of large gatherings, The Texas Observer reports that in May 2001 Abramoff "charged two of his clients $25,000 for a White House lunch date and a meeting with the President."

Time Magazine also reports having at least five White House publicity photos, or 'clicks' showing Bush together with Abramoff or Abramoff's family members.

U.S. Rep. & Former House Majority Leader Tom DeLay (R-TX)

Joining Abramoff on a vacation was Tom DeLay, whose airfare to London and Scotland in 2000 was charged to an American Express card issued to Abramoff, according to two sources who know Abramoff's credit card account number and to a copy of a travel invoice displaying that number. DeLay's expenses during the same trip for food, phone calls and other items at a golf course hotel in Scotland were billed to a different credit card also used on the trip by a second registered Washington lobbyist, Edwin A. Buckham, according to receipts documenting that portion of the trip.

U.S. Rep. & Former Chairman of the House Administration Committee Bob Ney (R-OH)

Bob Ney also guilty

In 2002, after Abramoff and Reed closed the casino of the Tigua tribe, Abramoff persuaded the tribe to hire him to lobby Congress to reopen the casino. After Abramoff met with Bob Ney to ask him to push the legislation, the Tigua (by overnight mail) sent three checks to Ney's political committees, totaling $32,000. The exchange of campaign contributions in return for Ney's support of an amendment to reopen the Tigua's casino constituted bribery.

Emails between Abramoff and the Tigua's political consultant show that Ney solicited the Tigua to pay for part of a 2002 golf trip to Scotland, knowing full well that solicitation of travel is specifically prohibited by House rules. Shortly after Ney returned from Scotland, he was scheduled to meet with members of the Tigua tribal council. Prior to that meeting, Abramoff reminded the Tigua that "for obvious reasons" the golf trip would not be mentioned at the meeting, but that Ney show his appreciation "in other ways", which was, Abramoff pointed out, just what the tribe wanted. Although the tribe never ended up paying for the golf trip, Ney's attempt to tie the gift of the trip to the legislative assistance the tribe was seeking likely violates federal criminal law.

Ney lied when he said he was "duped" by Abramoff and lied again on financial disclosure forms when he said that a nonprofit had paid for the trip. However, Safavian, in an email to his government employer seeking permission to go on the trip, states that Abramoff personally extended invitations to all the guests. Ney also said he made the trip to speak to Scottish parliamentarians. But the Scottish parliament wasn't in session at the time he was in Scotland.

Ney is also implicated in the separate Abramoff SunCruz scandal.

In 2005 Bob Ney set up a legal defense fund for Abramoff.

Bob Ney was "Representative #1," in Abramoff's January 3 plea agreement. On September 15, 2006 Ney's guilty plea for bribery related to Abramoff's clients and others was submitted to the court and made public.

U.S. Rep. Heather Wilson, CD1 (R-NM)

Congresswoman Heather Wilson received $1,000 in a direct contribution from Abramoff.

U.S. Rep. Tom Feeney, III (R-FL);

Congressman Tom Feeney (R-FL) joined other Republicans on the golf trip to Scotland with Abramoff in 2003.

U.S. Rep. Richard Pombo (R-CA)

In 2003, Abramoff gave Richard Pombo's (R-CA) PAC $5,000. Abramoff also gave $2,000, the maximum allowed, to Pombo's congressional campaign committee that same year.

On January 8, 2006, the Los Angeles Times reported that "Pombo helped one of Abramoff's clients, the Mashpee Indians in Massachusetts, gain official recognition as a tribe; the congressman received contributions from the lobbyist and the tribe in that instance."

U.S. Rep. Mike Ferguson (R-NJ)

New Jersey Republican Rep. Mike Ferguson is not going to give back the $1,000 he received in 2001, according to his spokeswoman Abby Bird.

U.S. Rep. Frank LoBiondo (R-NJ)

New Jersey Republican Rep. Frank LoBiondo has planned or has given back the $1000 contribution he had received in 2001.

U.S. Rep. Jim Saxton (R-NJ)

New Jersey Republican Rep. Jim Saxton has given back the 1000-dollar contribution he had received from Abramoff.

U.S. Senator Conrad Burns (R-MT)

Conrad Burns (R-Montana) is an alleged recipient of illegal favors and $136,000 in campaign contributions from Abramoff. As the chair of the Interior Subcommittee on Appropriations, Burns received over $136,000 in campaign contributions through Abramoff and then directed $3 million to the Saginaw Chippewa Tribe of Michigan, an Abramoff client and one of the wealthiest tribes in the country from a program intended to help the neediest tribes fix dilapidated schools.

After initially claiming credit for the appropriation, Burns subsequently denied knowledge of it. "A lot of things happened that I didn't know about. It shouldn't have happened, but it did."

Although initially refusing to return Abramoff's donations, Burns ultimately said that he would return or give away $150,000 he received from Abramoff and his clients.

In December, 2005, a leader of a tribe which gave $22,000 in campaign contributions to Burns in 2002 stated that they had done so solely at the request of Abramoff and believed the senator was part of "Abramoff's group".

U.S. Senator John Cornyn (R-TX)

(R-Texas) On November 12, 2001, Reed sent Abramoff an e-mail stating, "get me details so I can alert cornyn and let him know what we are doing to help him" [sic]. Similarly, on November 13, Reed wrote "I strongly suggest we start doing patch-throughs to perry and cornyn [sic]. We're getting killed on the phone." Also, on January 7, 2002, Reed sent Abramoff an e-mail stating "I think we should budget for an ataboy for cornyn" [sic].

When Cornyn ran for Senate, Abramoff contributed $1,000, the maximum amount legally allowed. Cornyn, who has spoken out against gambling, also received $6,250 in contributions from Las Vegas casino interests who oppose Indian gaming, some of which were made at the same time Cornyn was pushing to close the Tigua's casino.

New Jersey State Senator William Gormley (R-Atlantic, NJ)

New Jersey State Sen. William Gormley, R-Atlantic, got $1,000 from Abramoff when Gormley was running for the U.S. Senate in 2000.

Abramoff also gave $5,000 to the New Jersey Republican State Committee. New Jersey Democratic Party Chairwoman Bonnie Watson Coleman hopes this money will be returned to Abramoff.

According to an analysis by the nonpartisan OpenSecrets, Abramoff has contributed more than $220,000 in New Jersey since 1995, almost exclusively to Republican candidates and committees and only a "smattering" of those who received donations from Abramoff have returned them.

U.S. Senator Jim Talent (R-MO)

U.S. Rep. Ed Royce (R-CA)

In 2000, Abramoff gave $500 to Ed Royce.

== Politicians with connections to Indian affairs and Greenberg Traurig ==
U.S. Rep. J.D.Hayworth (R-AZ)

Rep.J.D. Hayworth the largest single recipient of Abramoff related money and co-chairman of the Congressional Native American Caucus, has received more than $150,000 from Indian tribes once represented by Abramoff.

U.S. Senator David Vitter (R-LA)

The Louisiana Jena Band of Choctaws offered testimony accusing Louisiana Senator David Vitter (R) of being in cahoots with Abramoff and his attempts to stymie the tribe's casino plans.

U.S. Senator Charles Grassley (R-IA)

Senator Charles Grassley (R-Iowa) is chairman of the Senate Finance Committee, one of several committees investigating the scandal. From 2001 to 2004, Grassley received over $62,000 in donations from groups related to the scandal. In March 2002 he sent a letter to Secretary of the Interior Gale Norton opposing the Jena casino. In April he received a donation of $1000 from Abramoff's firm.

U.S. Senate Minority Leader Harry Reid (D-NV)

Between 2001 and 2004 Sen. Harry Reid received $61,000 from donors with whom after the fact had hired Abramoff later on, Reid's office confirmed, and has decided not to return any donations. In a February 9, 2006 Washington Post article, Reid's office acknowledged contacts with Greenberg Traurig during this time.

Reid also intervened on government matters in ways that Abramoff's tribal clients might have deemed helpful, once opposing legislation on the Senate floor and four times sending letters pressing the Bush administration on tribal issues. Reid collected donations around the time of each action. Reid's office said none of the senator's actions were affected by donations or done for Abramoff.

Reid sent a letter they wrote on March 5, 2002, to Interior Secretary Gale Norton asking her to reject an application from the Jena Band of Choctaw Indians, which was seeking to open a casino outside its Louisiana reservation. An Abramoff client fighting the Jena casino, the Coushatta Tribe of Louisiana, donated $5,000 to Reid's political action committee, the Searchlight Leadership Fund, the next day, at Abramoff's request. While Abramoff never donated directly to Reid, the lobbyist did instruct the tribe to send $5,000 to the fund. The Washington Post reported that Abramoff sent a list to the tribe titled "Coushatta Requests" recommending donations to campaigns or groups for 50 lawmakers. Alongside Reid's name, Abramoff wrote, "5,000 (Searchlight Leadership Fund) Senate Majority Whip." Reid was Democratic whip at the time.

About the same time, Reid sent a letter to the Interior Department helpful to the tribe, records show. His March 5, 2002, letter pressed the agency to reject a casino proposed by a potential rival to the Coushattas, the Jena Band of Choctaw Indians. Sen. John Ensign (R-Nev.) also signed the letter.

Future Abramoff coworker Edward Ayoob before he knew Abramoff worked for Reid from June 1997 to March 2002 variously as legislative counsel, tax counsel, appropriations manager, foreign affairs adviser and chief aide on judicial nominations, according to a biography on his employer's Web site. Ayoob in 2002 was hired as a lobbyist by Greenberg Traurig LLP, where his work included teaming with Abramoff and other lobbyists on client matters. According to the Greenberg Traurig website, Greenberg Traurig has over 1400 lobbyists.

Abramoff left Greenberg Traurig in March 2004 after the Senate and the FBI began investigating his activities while Ayoob left Greenberg Traurig in spring 2005. Ayoob is now a senior lobbyist at Barnes & Thornburg LLP.

Reid downplayed Ayoob's role, saying Ayoob was a legislative assistant on his staff and not an adviser.

Ayoob and Reid met "from time to time" after Ayoob became a lobbyist, according to a Reid spokesperson. She said she did not know when they last spoke or how Reid would characterize their relationship today. The Washington Post has reported that the aide later helped throw a fundraiser for Reid at Abramoff's firm that raised money from several of Abramoff's lobbying partners.

U.S. Senator Byron Dorgan (D-ND)

Senator Byron Dorgan, the senior Democrat on the Senate Committee on Indian Affairs, had received at least $79,300 from associates and clients who later hired Abramoff to work for them.

After several news articles appeared detailing the tribal donations, Dorgan wrote a news release replying to several claims he said were erroneous, including the allegation he received money directly from Abramoff. In the release, Dorgan said, "The fact is I have never met Abramoff and have never received a campaign contribution from him. If he was directing any of his clients to make a political contribution to me, it was done without my knowledge."

Dorgan says, in the release, that his activities in support of several tribal programs are continuing his trend of supporting Native American issues since being elected, and do not stem from Abramoff-related campaign contributions.

In December 2005, Dorgan returned tribal donations totaling $67,000.

U.S. Senator Tom Harkin (D-IA)

According to the FEC, Sen. Tom Harkin (D-Iowa) failed to account properly for two fundraisers he held in Abramoff's skybox at Washington's MCI Center in 2002 and 2003, according to filings with the FEC and the Iowa Democrat's spokeswoman.

== Campaign contributions returned or donated ==
Many politicians have returned or donated all or part of the money received from Abramoff or his clients though only two lawmakers have given some of this money back to Native Americans. According to CBS, over 100 lawmakers have donated Abramoff related money to charity. It is not yet clear if donating the money will give them tax advantages in a way that returning the money would not or if these charities have a history of donating money or aiding favorable lawmakers in other ways.

President George W. Bush (R)

On January 4, 2005 President George W. Bush announced that his campaign will donate $6000 to the American Heart Association. The $6000 is the sum of the donations by Abramoff, Abramoff's wife, and the Saginaw Chippewa Indian Tribe of Michigan. The more than $100,000 in Bush Pioneer money raised by Abramoff, but not directly contributed by Abramoff will not be returned.

Republican Governors Association

On January 12, 2006, The Boston Globe reported paraphrased Massachusetts Governor, Mitt Romney, saying that "the Republican Governors Association would donate to charity $500,000 in contributions it received from a donor entwined in the Abramoff investigation."

U.S. Rep. J.D.Hayworth (R-AZ)

Rep.J.D. Hayworth, the largest single recipient of Abramoff related money and co-chairman of the Congressional Native American Caucus, has received more than $150,000 from Indian tribes once represented by Abramoff. Hayworth has said he will keep these donations because they were given independently of Abramoff's influence. He donated to charity $2,250 he got directly from Abramoff. The charity's name is unavailable, but was claimed to be related to Hurricane Katrina relief.

U.S. Senator Mel Martinez (R-FL)

Returned $2,500 contribution he received from Bob Ney. He has so far refused to return a quarter million dollars raised at a fundraiser co-chaired by Abramoff.

U.S. Senator Jim Talent (R-MO)

On October 26, Sen. Jim Talent returned a $2,000 contribution made to his 2002 Senate campaign by Abramoff. Talent also returned a $1,000 contribution that Abramoff's former law firm made to Talent's re-election campaign earlier this year.

U.S. Senator Max Baucus (D-MT)

Sen. Max Baucus gave $18,892 in Abramoff-related money he received to tribal colleges in Montana.

U.S. Senator Conrad Burns (R-MT)

Sen. Conrad Burns, the fourth largest recipient of Abramoff related money, some $60,000, announced that he would return or donate $150,000 he received from Abramoff and his clients. Via his spokesman he had previously claimed that the money could not be returned as the committee that received it was shut down and the money was "already spent".

Burns attempt to make a $111,000 "donation" to the Montana-Wyoming Tribal Leaders Council was rejected by the tribe who said the money was tainted because it originally came from Abramoff and his clients.

Julia Doney, president of the Fort Belknap Indian Community Council, and a member of the tribal leaders council, explained that the tribes are "tired of being used" and don't want help Burns with his political troubles.

"it's tainted money" said Doney

The Blackfeet Community College has also refused to accept money Burns because it came from Jack Abramoff. James St. Goddard, a Blackfeet council member, told The Great Falls Tribune that taking the money "would have made it look like the money is clean. We do not want Mr. Burns to use the tribes any more for his political gain."

U.S. Rep. Denny Rehberg (R-MT)

Rep. Denny Rehberg returned $20,000.

U.S. Senator Byron Dorgan (D-ND)

On December 13, 2005 Sen. Byron Dorgan reported that he would return $67,000 in questionable donations from Abramoff's clients (the entirety of his "Abramoff-related money"). Dorgan was quoted as saying he would not "knowingly keep even one dollar in contributions if there is even a remote possibility that they could have been the result of any action Mr. Abramoff might have taken."

U.S. Rep. Frank LoBiondo (R-NJ)

On August 18, 2005, Rep. Frank LoBiondo said he plans to give back the $1,000 contribution he received in 2001 from Abramoff.

U.S. Rep. Jim Saxton (R-NJ)

On August 18, 2005 Rep. Jim Saxton also returned a $1,000 contribution Abramoff made in 2001.

U.S. Senator Hillary Clinton (D-NY)

On January 5, 2006, Sen. Hillary Clinton's campaign announced that it would contribute $2,000 in donations from American Indian tribe clients of lobbyist Jack Abramoff to a New York charity.

U.S. Rep. & Former Chairman of the House Transportation Committee Ernest Istook (R-OK)

On January 9, 2006, Rep. Ernest Istook announced he is giving $23,000 that was donated to his re-election campaign or his PAC to the Boy Scouts of America. This is in addition to $6,000 in Abramoff-related donations given to Indian health research last month. In December 2005, Rep. Ernest Istook, said he would donate a $1,000 campaign donation he received from Abramoff to the Oklahoma Medical Research Foundation for Indian health research. A $5,000 donation to a political action committee Istook was involved with will also be given to the OMRF.

U.S. Rep. Peter DeFazio(D-OR)

On January 9, 2006, the office of Rep. Peter DeFazio announced he will return $1,500 he received from out-of-state Indian tribes represented by disgraced lobbyist Jack Abramoff.

U.S. Rep. Eric Cantor (R-VA)

As the Virginia Democratic Party called on all Virginia Republicans in Congress to dump Abramoff's contributions, Virginia Representative and chief deputy Republican whip Eric Cantor announced that he would donate almost 10,000 of Abramoff money to charity on January 4.

U.S. Rep. Thomas M. Davis, III (R-VA)

At the same time, the Richmond Times-Dispatch reported that "Rep. Thomas M. Davis III, R-11th, planned to give to charity money from the Abramoffs and tribal clients, possibly totaling $4,500, according to an aide who was uncertain of the exact amount.

U.S. Rep. J. Randy Forbes (R-VA)

Rep. J. Randy Forbes planned to give to charity $1,000 from the Abramoffs;

U.S. Senator John W. Warner (R-VA)

and Sen. John W. Warner, $1,000, from an Indian tribe."

== Campaign contributions to be kept ==
Some politicians who received campaign contributions from Abramoff's clients, but not from Abramoff himself, have decided to keep donations.

President George W. Bush (R)

On January 4, 2005 President George W. Bush announced that his campaign will donate $6000 to the American Heart Association. The $6000 is the sum of the donations by Abramoff, Abramoff's wife, and the Saginaw Chippewa Indian Tribe of Michigan. The more than $100,000 in Bush Pioneer money raised by Abramoff, but not directly contributed by Abramoff will not be returned.

U.S. Rep. J.D.Hayworth (R-AZ)

Rep.J.D. Hayworth the largest single recipient of Abramoff related money and co-chairman of the Congressional Native American Caucus, has received more than $150,000 from Indian tribes once represented by Abramoff. These donations Hayworth has said he will keep because they were given independently of Abramoff's influence. He donated to charity $2,250 he got directly from Abramoff.

U.S. Senator Mel Martinez (R-FL)

Senator Martinez has so far decided not to return $250,000 raised at a fundraiser co-chaired by Abramoff.

U.S. Senator Patty Murray (D-WA)

Sen. Patty Murray received $35,000 from tribal donors who once used Abramoff's services. Murray will not return the donations, saying in a letter to the Seattle Times, "I will not rush to scapegoat those tribes who have already been victimized by Jack Abramoff."

U.S. Senate Minority Leader Harry Reid (D-NV)

Sen. Harry Reid received $61,000 from Indian tribes represented by Abramoff's firm, Reid's office confirmed, and has decided not to return any donations.

U.S. Rep. Charles Rangel (D-NY)

Rep. Charles Rangel of Harlem, who received $36,000 in donations from Abramoff clients, says he's keeping the money. A Rangel spokesman says Abramoff's guilty pleas won't affect Rangel's decision.

U.S. Rep. John Doolittle (R-CA)

Rep. John Doolittle, who is the fifth highest recipient of Abramoff-directed money and has gotten more money from this source than any two Democrats combined, has refused to return the donations, explaining that the money is his.

U.S. Rep. Randy Forbes (R-VA)

Rep. Randy Forbes was not a major receiver of funds, but has kept the $2,000 from the Coushatta Tribe of Louisiana, $1,000 from the Mississippi Band of Choctaw Indians, and $1,000 from the Tigua Indian Reservation.

U.S. Rep Charles H. Taylor (R-NC)

Over several years, Taylor's campaign received approximately $3,000 total in donations from now convicted lobbyist Jack Abramoff, his firm, and one of his clients. Several editorials in the Asheville Citizen-Times have called on Taylor to explain his relationship with Abramoff, which he has so far chosen not to do, other than to claim he did nothing wrong and wasn't going to give up the money he received from Abramoff.

== See also ==
- List of trips funded by Jack Abramoff
