= Morou Ouattara =

Chef

- Born: Ivory Coast
- Occupations: executive chef and entrepreneur

Morou Ouattara is an executive chef and owner of the Kora and Farrah Olivia restaurants in Arlington, VA. Born and raised on the Ivory Coast in West Africa in a family with 33 children, he combines French, African and Middle Eastern cuisines. He has appeared on Iron Chef America, and was a contestant on The Next Iron Chef, but was eliminated during the 'Resourcefulness' challenge. Unlike most chefs, he uses his first name professionally, preferring to be referred to as 'Chef Morou' instead of 'Chef Ouattara'.

== Career ==
Morou moved to Washington, DC in 1988 to study computer science. While at school, he worked as a dishwasher at Francesco Ricchi’s I'Ricchi. He stayed there for three years, and progressed through stations of the restaurant's kitchen. In 1991, he left I'Ricchi to work under Mark Miller at Red Sage, and rose to be executive chef.

In 2002, Chef Morou moved to be executive chef at Signatures and revealed his own style, a combination of French, African and Middle Eastern flavors, though reviews said in retrospect he restrained himself at the location; one reviewer said, "Watching Ouattara at Signatures was a little like watching a talented filmmaker turning out commercials, the brilliance of his work confined to discrete bursts." He remained there until it closed in 2005. After consulting and appearing on Iron Chef America, Morou opened Farrah Olivia in the fall of 2006. Freed from the necessity of offering more conventional restaurant fare, Morou began to experiment and gained a reputation for being a brilliant, though inconsistent, chef. Farrah Olivia was closed in April 2009 (because of irreconcilable differences between Morou and his landlord).

After a break Morou (together with his brother) opened Kora, serving trattoria style Italian food. Four days a week, Farrah Olivia is opened in the private dining room of Kora, featuring a more menu like in the old Farrah Olivia.

He ran a restaurant, Lily and the Cactus, in NE Washington DC serving the same cuisine he was known for in the Red Sage, which was Located in NOMA between grocery stores and fast food chains. His style is more rustic then prior restaurants but he has gone back to his southwestern roots inside the Hilton Garden Inn on First St. Lily and the Cactus was closed January 2022.

== Jack Abramoff scandal ==
In late 2005, Signatures, the restaurant where Morou was executive chef, was closed in the wake of the Jack Abramoff scandal. Lobbyist Jack Abramoff, who owned the restaurant, frequently used his ownership of the restaurant to offer free meals and fancy fundraisers to sway lawmakers. Morou stated that Abramoff was a good boss who gave him a lot of freedom in the kitchen, but after the scandal was revealed, people with strong political ties did not want to be seen at the restaurant, for fear that people might assume they were being treated by Abramoff. The political 'scene' was more than fifty percent of the restaurant's business, and it was forced to close due to lack of revenue. The investment group Da Vinci Group started arrangements to take over the restaurant, however, in November 2005, Da Vinci pulled out of the deal, and the restaurant was closed.

== Television appearances ==
- Iron Chef America
- The Next Iron Chef
