= Will Brooke =

American political staffer

Will Brooke is an American political staffer and a figure in the Jack Abramoff Indian lobbying scandal.

He worked as chief of staff to U.S. Senator Conrad Burns (R-Montana) from November 2000 until the end of 2003, when he quit "to resume his Bozeman law practice and be the statewide chief" for President George W. Bush's Montana re-election campaign, Burns said in December 2003.

In January 2001 Brooke went on a trip to Super Bowl XXXV in Tampa, Florida paid for (against House ethics rules) by Jack Abramoff's SunCruz Casinos. Also on the trip were Burns appropriations staffer Ryan Thomas, Tom DeLay staffers, and Bob Ney chief of staff Neil Volz.

Brooke and Volz then became members of "Team Abramoff" at Greenberg Traurig.

In December 2005, Brooke was working as a lobbyist for the Washington firm Ryan, Phillips, Utrecht & MacKinnon, with a lobbying office in Bozeman.

It was later reported that Brooke voluntarily met with federal investigators and the Department of Justice and disclosed all information related to the Super Bowl XXXV trip as well as his work with Abramoff's firm, Greenberg Traurig. During the course of the investigation, it was revealed that Brooke had confirmed in advance of the Super Bowl trip that the trip complied with Senate ethics rules. Brooke was never charged with any violation of Senate ethic rules or any federal law. He now owns and operates Brooke Law Firm, P.C., located in Bozeman, Montana.

== Footnotes ==
As of this edit, this article uses content from SourceWatch, a source licensed under the terms of the GNU Free Documentation License which was imported into Wikipedia before November 2008 and is therefore validly licensed for use on Wikipedia. All relevant terms must be followed. The original article was at "Will Brooke".
