= Susan Ralston =

American businesswoman

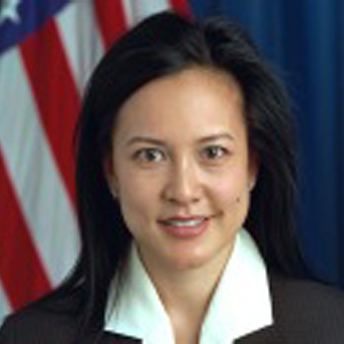
Ralston's 2001 White House portrait.

Susan Bonzon Ralston (born October 15, 1967), is public relations and business consultant. Ralston was formerly Special Assistant to President George W. Bush and a deputy to Karl Rove, the Deputy Chief of Staff and Senior Advisor at the White House, from 2001 until her resignation in 2006.

== Early life and education ==
Ralston was born in Pennsylvania to Filipino-American parents, Teotimo D. Bonzon and Purificacion Lagman Bonzon. She graduated from Loyola University Chicago with a bachelor's degree with honors, and from Keller Graduate School of Management with a Masters of Business Administration.

== Early career ==
Before moving to Washington, D.C., Ralston was an office administrator for M&J Wilkow, Ltd., a commercial real estate firm in Chicago, Illinois. In Washington, she worked for Jack Abramoff, at the legal and lobbying firm of Preston Gates Ellis & Rouvelas Meeds, LLP. In 2001, when Abramoff left Preston Gates to work at Greenberg Traurig, she also changed firms, continuing to work for Abramoff, with the title of assistant director of Governmental Affairs.

== Personal life ==
Ralston lives near Culpeper, Virginia with her husband Troy.

== Government career ==
=== White House ===
Ralston was hired in 2001 as the most senior assistant to Karl Rove. Ralston was the Special Assistant to the President and a deputy to Rove, the Deputy Chief of Staff and Senior Advisor at the White House for almost six years. She was responsible for managing the activities that comprised the Office of the Senior Advisor, including the development of policy, strategic planning, political affairs, public liaison, and intergovernmental affairs efforts of the White House. She was also responsible for the development and production of presidential and major surrogate events.

As a Filipino-American, Ralston was a member of the presidential delegation to attend the inauguration of President Gloria Macapagal Arroyo of the Philippines in June 2004. She took part in a bi-partisan exchange to Vietnam in August 2003 that was organized by the American Council of Young Political Leaders (ACYPL).

=== Investigations and questioning ===
On July 29, 2005, Ralston testified before federal grand jury prosecutor Patrick J. Fitzgerald, investigating whether government officials illegally disclosed the identity of CIA officer Valerie Wilson. Matthew Cooper made a call sometime in July 2003 to Karl Rove, but there were no records of the call. Ralston claimed there were no records because they had transferred his call.

On January 3, 2006, Jack Abramoff pleaded guilty to conspiracy, and related charges, and agreed to cooperate with prosecutors in a corruption probe in Washington. In September 2006, the House Government Reform Committee released a report on Abramoff's dealings with the White House. Ralston resigned on October 6, 2006, after it became known that she had accepted gifts and passed information to Abramoff.

In May 2007, Ralston sought immunity before testifying in front of Representative Henry Waxman's House Committee on Oversight and Government Reform. She was deposed in private before asking for immunity. On May 10, 2007, she testified to the United States Committee on Oversight and Government Reform that Rove used a Republican National Committee (RNC) email account daily for most of his official communications as Deputy White House Chief of Staff for Strategic Planning and Senior Advisor to the President, a possible violation of the Presidential Records Act of 1978.

== Other organizations ==
Ralston created SBR Enterprises in 2012. It received $300,000 in funding from the Paul E Singer Family Foundation between 2018 and 2020.

In 2019 Ralston founded Citizens for Responsible Solar, which advocates for the proper siting of utility-scale solar on industrial-zoned land, not on agricultural land. Lisa Lisker is its treasurer. Ralston and others lobbied against a 1600-acre 80 megawatt solar project by BayWa near Culpeper.

In 2020 Ralston also founded Culpeper Battlefield Tours, LLC as a result of her work to preserve historic agricultural land, specifically the Brandy Station Battlefield, the site of the largest cavalry battle of the Civil War. Virginia equestrians study cavalry battle Cavalries clash in Brandy Station
