= Jack Abramoff controversies =

American political scandal

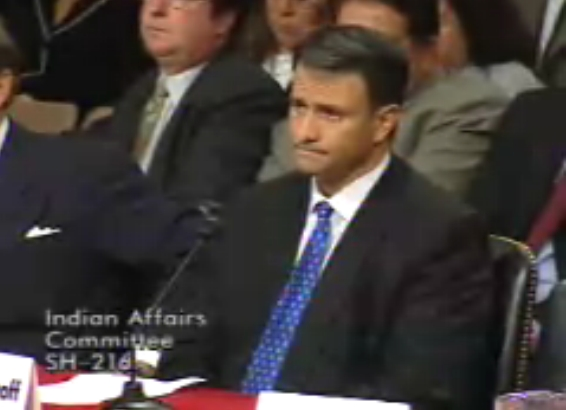
Jack Abramoff in September 2004

The Jack Abramoff controversies were a series of investigations into Jack Abramoff, a Washington, D.C.-based lobbyist, which culminated in several plea agreements by those involved, including U.S. Representative Bob Ney (R-OH). Abramoff pleaded guilty to federal corruption charges, including tax fraud and bribing public officials.

Abramoff's activities also became an issue that many Democratic candidates raised in the November 2006 U.S. House and U.S. Senate elections, as challengers painted the incumbent Republican Congress as tarnished and corrupted by Abramoff and his powerful allies. On March 29, 2006, Abramoff was sentenced to five years and ten months in prison and ordered to pay restitution of more than $21 million.

As a result of Abramoff's criminal behavior, prominent politicians with close ties to Abramoff and hundreds of Congressional politicians who received contributions from his clients as part of the monetary influence of Jack Abramoff came under media scrutiny, and some donated their contributions to charity.

In 2006, responding to the Abramoff controversies, lobbying reform proposals were presented in Congress by both parties. In September 2006, both the U.S. Senate and U.S. House passed legislation and rules changes related to federal earmarks and other substantive lobbying reforms.

== Controversies ==
=== Jack Abramoff Indian lobbying scandal ===
Abramoff was under investigation by federal grand juries for his involvement in the multimillion-dollar defrauding of Native American tribes who were his lobbying clients, and related bribery of public officials. On January 3, 2006, Abramoff pled guilty to three felony counts: conspiracy, fraud, and tax evasion (Abramoff owes the Internal Revenue Service $1.7 million for that charge). In addition, Abramoff and other defendants must make restitution of at least $25 million USD that was defrauded from clients, most notably the Native American tribes. Abramoff's guilty plea was part of a plea deal that requires him to cooperate in the ongoing investigation of his role in congressional corruption.

The agreement alleges that Abramoff bribed public officials, including a person identified as "Representative #1," confirmed to be Bob Ney, a Republican congressman from Ohio. Also included: the hiring of congressional staffers and conspiring with them to lobby their former employers; including members of Congress in violation of a one-year federal ban on such lobbying. Ney has established a legal defense fund for himself to defend against possible charges related to Abramoff. On January 15, 2006, Ney relinquished his post as Chairman of the House Administration Committee. On May 8, 2006, Ney's former Chief of Staff, Neil Volz pleaded guilty to one count of conspiracy, including wire fraud and violating House rules. On June 20, 2006, White House procurement official David Safavian, a long-time colleague of Abramoff and Grover Norquist, was convicted of lying and obstruction for concealing his efforts at the GSA to aid Abramoff.

=== Jack Abramoff Guam investigation ===
Abramoff was under investigation by a grand jury in Guam over an alleged plot to control the functions of the courts in that territory, until the prosecutor was removed from office by the Bush administration.

=== SunCruz Casinos investigation ===
Abramoff was indicted on August 11, 2005, by a grand jury in Fort Lauderdale, Florida, for bank fraud arising from the purchase of SunCruz Casinos. On January 4, 2006, Abramoff pled guilty to conspiring to commit wire fraud and mail fraud, and of a separate charge of wire fraud.

=== Team Abramoff ===
Abramoff's influence circle.

=== Other scandals ===
Abramoff made multiple payments to Doug Bandow, former Senior Fellow at the Cato Institute, and at least one other think tank expert, Peter Ferrara, to write opinion pieces favorable to his clients.

Abramoff was involved in a scandal to influence the U.S. Department of Interior to prevent the Jena Band of Choctaw Indians from building a Casino that would take away money from one of Abramoff's tribal clients. Abramoff paid the Council of Republicans for Environmental Advocacy (CREA), in exchange for help from CREA president Italia Federici in persuading Deputy Secretary for the U.S. Department of Interior J. Steven Griles to block the Jena Band's casino application.

In 2002, Abramoff was a registered lobbyist for the General Council for Islamic Banks, for which he was paid $20,000. Saleh Abdullah Kamel, chairman of the council, was investigated for allegedly funding terrorism and terrorists, including Osama bin Laden, the architect of the September 11 attacks.
