= Capitol Punishment (book) =

2011 autobiography by Jack Abramoff

- The cover of Capitol Punishment, written by Jack Abramoff in 2011
- Author: Jack Abramoff
- Language: English
- Genre: Non-fiction memoir
- Publisher: WNDbooks
- Publication date: November 2011
- Publication place: United States
- Pages: 300
- ISBN: 978-1-936488-44-5

Capitol Punishment: The Hard Truth About Washington Corruption From America's Most Notorious Lobbyist is a 2011 memoir by American former lobbyist Jack Abramoff, published by WNDbooks.

In December 2011, The Washington Post described the book as an "account of his political triumphs, serial lawbreaking and unethical conduct", details the author's life in Washington, D.C., as a power broker and lobbyist. In its last chapter, titled "Path to Reform", Abramoff lists a number of proposals to eliminate bribery of federal government officials.

== Writing process ==
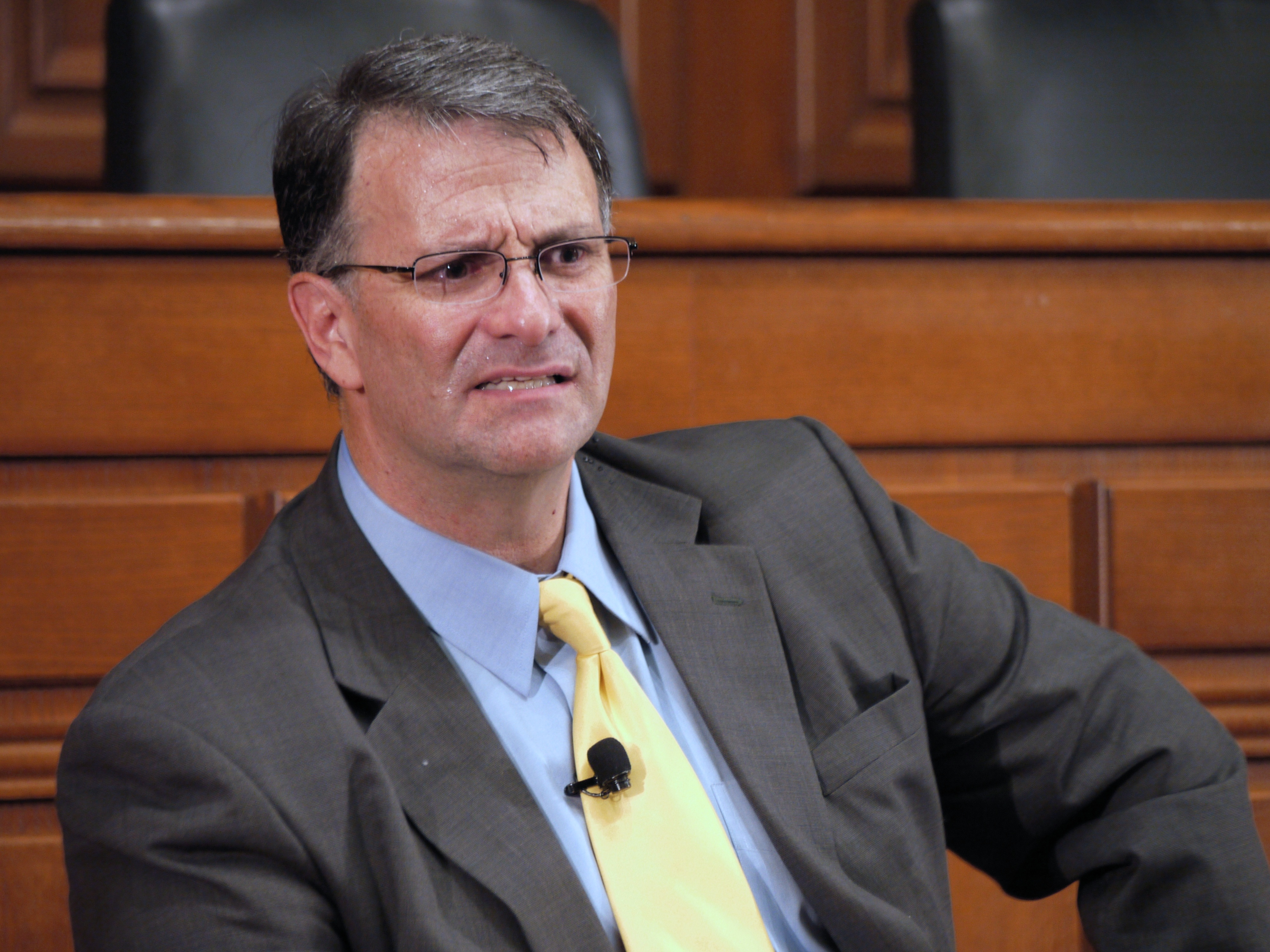
Abramoff in December 2011

Abramoff wrote Capitol Punishment in four weeks after having served four years in a federal prison for corruption connected to his lobbying. When NPR asked Abramoff why he wrote the book, he said, "When I was in prison, I started thinking about how to fix the system that is there. Because, obviously, throwing Jack Abramoff in jail didn't clean up the system", adding "I had something to give back, some way to make some recompense for what I was by telling what is going on in Washington – from the point of view of somebody who rose very high in that industry – and what goes on behind those doors, and how horrible it really is."

== Content ==
The book details the inner workings of Washington, D.C., which Abramoff knew. It discusses Abramoff's relationships with powerful congressional leaders, including Tom DeLay and Bob Ney, and shares the names of senators who, according to Abramoff, took tens of thousands of dollars, but offers no significant new details beyond what was known before, and "doesn't help identify the people he corrupted who are still on the Hill", as The Huffington Post notes. Some of the people he accuses of having taken money from his team and clients, particularly members of the Senate Indian Affairs Committee and Democratic Party politicians, have denied the allegations, calling Abramoff "a liar".

The book is meant to expose what Abramoff considers the real problem of Washington, D.C.–based lobbying. The real problem, according to Abramoff, is not what is illegal in Washington, D.C., but rather what is legal. In the last chapter of the book, Abramoff portrays himself as someone who supports genuine reform. He suggests to shut the "revolving door" between Capitol Hill and the K Street offices of the biggest lobbying firms by banning legislators and their aides for life from becoming lobbyists. He also proposes barring lobbyists from giving gifts to lawmakers, and prohibiting lobbyists and special interest groups from making political donations. In addition to this, he advocates instituting term limits for representatives and senators.
