= Yang Enterprises =

American software company

Yang Enterprises (a.k.a. YEI) is a software company based in Oviedo, Florida. It is owned by Tyng-Lin Yang and Li-Woan Yang, who, as of 2018, are the founder/executive vice president and the CEO/president, respectively.

== History ==
YEI received its first contract in 1993 from I-Net, starting with three employees. In 1994, YEI received an award from the Kennedy Space Center as their small woman-owned business of the year. By 1995, they had 18 employees and contracts with Rockwell Collins and Lockheed Martin. By 2004, they were also working with ExxonMobil, NASA, and the Florida Department of Transportation (FDOT). By 2005, YEI was the largest business in Oviedo with almost 300 employees. By 2018, they had also worked with the United States Air Force and multiple Fortune 500 companies. In 2023, they had a contract with the United States Space Force.

=== Relationship with Tom Feeney ===
Tom Feeney had filed incorporation papers for the company in the 1980s. When he was the Speaker of the Florida House of Representatives, Feeney was also the general counsel and Orange County, Florida lobbyist for YEI, dating back to about 1987. Also during his tenure as Florida House speaker, Feeney appointed Ms. Yang to a state technology task force. In July 2000, Feeney arranged a meeting between YEI and the State Technology Office Head, Roy Cales. At the time, YEI was accused of filing fraudulent invoices regarding its contract with the FDOT. A worker at Feeney's office also demanded that state officials sign an advocacy letter for YEI and return it to Feeney. Feeney denied an improper relationship, and the Florida state Ethics Commission cleared him of wrongdoing.

Between 1999 and 2005, the Yang family donated $13,700 to Feeney's campaigns, with his 2002 campaign being hosted at a YEI office space. An attorney for YEI was a former law partner of Feeney.

=== Electoral fraud allegations ===
In 2004, Clint Curtis alleged that in September 2000 then-Republican Congressman Tom Feeney had asked his (Curtis) then-employer, Yang Enterprises, to write software to change votes on electronic voting machines in a way that was undetectable. Curtis said that YEI told him that the purpose was to "control the vote" in West Palm Beach, Florida. Curtis also said that Feeney planned ways to lower the "black vote" with "exclusion lists" and police patrols. These claims were denied by Feeney and a YEI employee. Curtis shared his allegations in an affidavit to the Democratic members of the House Judiciary Committee in December 2004.

=== Espionage allegations ===
Curtis also alleged that YEI had spied on NASA by downloading documents from its computers. He told a reporter from The Daytona Beach News-Journal that YEI employed an undocumented immigrant from China, Hai Lin Nee, while contracted with NASA. Curtis said that Nee was working on projects with access to data from NASA and the state of Florida. In March 2004, Nee was arrested in a sting operation by United States Immigration and Customs Enforcement for attempting to mail low-noise amplifier chips to Beijing in 1999, which could be used for missile guidance. YEI denied having Nee as an employee, which was contradicted by state records. Curtis shared his findings with a NASA investigator in 2002, but the outcome of that investigation is unknown. As of December 2004, these allegations were under investigation by Citizens for Responsibility and Ethics in Washington and by the office of then-senator Bill Nelson.

=== Fraudulent invoice allegations ===
==== Florida Department of Transportation ====
Curtis left YEI in February 2001 to work for the FDOT. He alleged that YEI had overbilled the state of Florida by, among other ways, including hours for Curtis for periods of time when he no longer worked for them. In July 2001, he and another FDOT employee, Mavis Georgalis, filed a complaint with the FDOT inspector general, but the investigation did not progress, and the pair were fired in April 2002. Ray Lemme, who worked at the FDOT Inspector General's Office, persisted with the investigation. Curtis said that in June 2003, he met with Lemme, who said his findings went "all the way to the top." In July 2003, Lemme was found dead at a motel in Valdosta, Georgia. An unsigned suicide note was at the scene, his wife said that he was under stress from work, and friends said that he had health issues. Local police had ruled his death a suicide, stating that the death scene had no photos. However, confirmed images from the death scene had been posted to the Internet, with The Moscow Times reporting that the pictures showed evidence of a struggle. The investigation into Lemme's death was reopened and then shut down upon local police speaking with an unknown person in the Florida state government.

==== NASA ====
In 2015, federal prosecutors accused YEI and a second contractor, URS Federal Services Inc, of submitting fraudulent invoices of at least $387,000 between 2009 and 2015 in their work with NASA vehicles.
