= William Heaton =

William Heaton (born 1978) is the former chief of staff for former Rep. Bob Ney (R-Ohio), and a supporting figure in the Abramoff scandal.

== Education ==
Heaton grew up in Winston-Salem, North Carolina. He attended Bishop McGuiness Memorial Catholic High School where he was elected student council president. Heaton was also active in sports while at Bishop McGuinness, participating on the junior varsity basketball team and the varsity cross country team. Heaton spent his junior year of high school in Washington, DC where he participated in the congressional page program. He won the student council presidency election even though he was in Washington, DC.

After high school, Heaton attended the College of William and Mary. After graduating, he worked as a floor assistant to then-Speaker Dennis Hastert (R-Ill.). As late as February 2007, Heaton was listed on the College's website as one of 12 "Distinguished Alumni".

== Career ==
Heaton worked as Ney's executive assistant on the House Administration Committee, and he succeeded Neil Volz as Ney's chief of staff in 2002. At the age of 23, he was the youngest chief of staff on Capitol Hill. He left in July 2006 and was named as "Staffer C" in Ney's plea deal of September 15, 2006. He is currently employed as Director of Board Relations and Assistant to the CEO at the Council on Foundations. Was formerly Director of Communications at Washington Theological Union in Washington, DC.

== Abramoff scandal ==
Heaton pleaded guilty to one count of conspiracy to commit fraud admitting to conspiring with Ney, Jack Abramoff and others to accept vacations, meals, tickets, and contributions to Ney's campaign in exchange for Ney benefitting Abramoff's clients, none of whom lived in Ohio.

Pleaded Guilty	Sentenced	Sentence	Started Serving	Current Location
February 26, 2007	August 16, 2007	24 months probation, 100 hours community service, $5000 fine		N/A

=== Trips with Ney ===
The picture at left is from the much publicized trip to St. Andrews, the famed Scottish golf course. This trip was paid for by Abramoff at a cost of $160,000. Heaton admitted "falsifying his and Ney's financial disclosure forms in 2002 and 2003 to keep gifts secret. For example, Ney's forms said the Scotland trip was paid for by the National Center for Public Policy Research so he could meet with Scottish parliamentarians, though the Scottish Parliament was not in session...."

On August 29, 2003, Heaton joined Ney and another Ney staffer for a one-night stopover in London where they were furnished with thousands of dollars' worth of gambling chips for use at private casinos, "from a foreign businessman who has been identified by Ney's attorney as Fouad al-Zayat, a high-rolling London gambler who sought Ney's help in circumventing a law barring the sale of U.S.-made airplanes and airplane parts to other countries." Ney lied to customs to smuggle in thousands of dollars received during the trip.

== See also ==
List of federal political scandals in the United States
