= Mark Zachares =

American politician (born 1964)

Personal details
- Born: May 15, 1964 Florida, U.S.
- Party: Republican
- Education: University of Florida
- Occupation: Congressional aide, lobbyist
- Known for: Involvement in the Jack Abramoff lobbying scandal

Mark Zachares is an American Republican politician and lobbyist who served as Congressional aide to Rep. Don Young (R-Alaska). He pleaded guilty on April 24, 2007 to accepting tens of thousands of dollars in gifts from lobbyist Jack Abramoff in return for using his position in Congress to advance Abramoff's interests.

== Career ==
Zachares became acquainted with Jack Abramoff while serving as Secretary of the Department of Labor and Immigration for the Commonwealth of the Northern Mariana Islands ("the CNMI"); Abramoff was a lobbyist for business interests of the U.S. territory. The Anchorage Daily News described their relationship:

Abramoff was the commonwealth's lobbyist. According to the Saipan Tribune, he was paid at least $11 million from 1994 to 2001 to prevent Congress from interfering with local regulation of wage rates and immigration - the two issues under Zachares' authority. "Beginning in the mid-1990s, Zachares came to have extensive contact with Abramoff during Zachares' tenure as an official of the CNMI, and Zachares and Abramoff became personal and professional acquaintances", the charging document said.

Zachares received $10,000 from Abramoff's false charity, Capital Athletic Foundation in two payments. The first came while he was secretary, the second after leaving the job. Starting after the 2000 election and a number of months afterwards, Abramoff attempted to convince the White House to hire Mark Zachares as the head of the Interior Department's Office of Insular Affairs. In 2002, Abramoff helped Zachares secure a job as legal counsel to the Oversight & Investigations subcommittee of the House Committee on Transportation and Infrastructure, then became staff director for the Coast Guard & Maritime subcommittee—both overseen by Rep. Don Young, who served on the committee that oversees insular affairs, the House Resources Committee.

It was alleged that

While doing favors for Abramoff from his positions on Young's committee, Zachares was rewarded with all kinds of favors, from being invited on a $160,000 golf trip to Scotland to use of Abramoff's luxury box seats at the MCI Center in Washington where the Wizards of the NBA and Capitals of the NHL play, $30,000 worth of sporting and event tickets from Abramoff, free meals and drinks at Abramoff's restaurant Signatures, and free rounds of golf at Woodmore Country Club, where Abramoff was a member.

Zachares, as part of his plea bargain, agreed to cooperate with federal prosecutors, who, in exchange, would not prosecute Zachares' wife, Cynthia.

The scandal was portrayed in the 2010 movie Casino Jack and the United States of Money.
