= Preston Gates & Ellis =

Law firm

- Company type: Limited Liability Partnership
- Industry: Law
- Founded: 1883
- Defunct: 2007 (merged into K&L Gates)
- Headquarters: Seattle, Washington, U.S.
- Products: Legal services
- Website: www.prestongates.com

Preston Gates & Ellis, LLP, also known as Preston Gates, was a law firm with offices in the United States, China, and Taiwan. Its main office was in the IDX Tower in Seattle. In 2007, the firm merged with Kirkpatrick & Lockhart Nicholson Graham to form K&L Gates.

The "Gates" in the firm's name refers to William H. Gates Sr., father of Microsoft founder Bill Gates. Gates retired from the firm in 1998.

== History ==
=== 19th century ===
In 1883, Harold Preston, born 1858 in Illinois, the son of Brig. Gen. Simon Manly Preston, arrived in Seattle and established his own law practice. Together with O.B. Thorgrimson, an attorney originally from Chicago, Preston expanded the practice throughout the early 1900s.

=== 20th century ===
In 1924, Roger Shidler and George Harroun established another law firm based in Washington state. William H. Gates Sr. joined the firm in 1964, and as principal counsel expanded the firm's clients to include high technology, manufacturing, distribution, service and other businesses.

In 1949, Jim Ellis joined the firm Preston, Thorgrimson & Horowitz, and was integral in involving the firm in public service projects for the city of Seattle, and opened the firm's Washington, D.C. office in 1973. Ellis eventually became a name partner in the firm, which was known in the 1980s as Preston Thorgrimson Ellis & Holman.

In 1990, Shidler McBroom Gates and Lucas merged with Preston Thorgrimson Ellis & Holman to form Preston Thorgrimson Shidler Gates & Ellis, renamed in 1997 as Preston Gates & Ellis, LLP. The firm's office in Washington, D.C. is known as Preston Gates Ellis & Rouvelas Meeds LLP. When it was opened in 1973, partners included Emanuel Rouvelas, former counsel to the U.S. Senate Committee on Commerce, and former U.S. Representative Lloyd Meeds (D-WA). Its major clients include Microsoft, which paid the firm over $1.3 million for lobbying various U.S. federal government departments and agencies. During this time, the firm's chairman was William Neukom, who was employed by Microsoft as head of its legal department.

==== Jack Abramoff scandals ====
From 1994 until 2001, Jack Abramoff, associated with one of the largest lobbying scandals in U.S. history, was a lobbyist in the firm's Washington, D.C. office.
