= Signatures (restaurant) =

Former Washington D.C. Jack Abramoff property

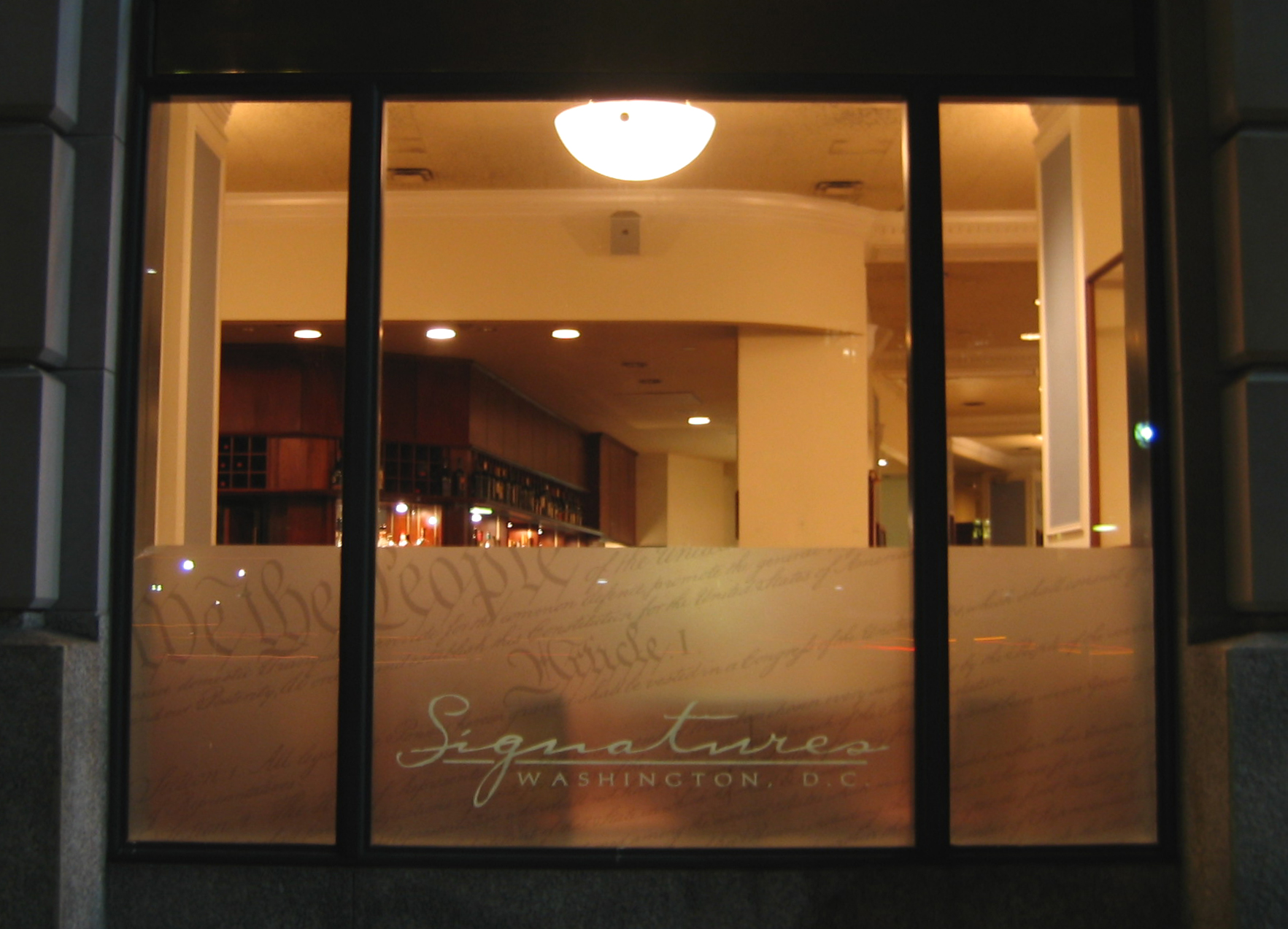
- Exterior window of Signatures, January 2006
- Interactive map of Signatures

Restaurant information
- Established: February 2002
- Closed: November 16, 2005
- Previous owner: Jack Abramoff
- Food type: Contemporary American
- Location: 801 Pennsylvania Avenue NW, Washington, D.C., United States
- Coordinates: 38.8943965°N 77.0233055°W
- Seating capacity: Main dining room: 104; Patio: 50
- Reservations: Accepted

Signatures was a restaurant in Washington D.C., opened by Jack Abramoff in February 2002. Expensive and lavishly appointed with expensive memorabilia, Villeroy & Boch chargers and Christofle flatware, Signatures was used by Abramoff in coordination with his skyboxes and foreign trips to spend money primarily given by Indian tribes on politicians. During 17 months between 2002 and 2003, Signatures gave away $180,000 of food and drinks. The restaurant was located at 801 Pennsylvania Avenue NW in the Penn Quarter neighborhood of Washington, D.C. It closed on November 16, 2005.

Signatures rivaled The Capital Grille, opened in 1994, as the premier high-end Republican restaurant in the city. It was more successful than Abramoff's two other Washington D.C. food ventures, Archives Restaurant and Stacks Delicatessen, both kosher eateries.

In 2002, the political website PoliticsPA named it to their list of restaurants most frequented by politicians.

== Restaurant's use in Abramoff's federal lobbying ==
Jack Abramoff billed his tribal clients hundreds of thousands of dollars for meals at Signatures. Billing, campaign finance records, and restaurant records show, for example, that the Mississippi Band of Choctaw Indians paid Greenberg Traurig over $5,600, and that the Agua Caliente Band of Cahuilla Indians paid as much as $20,000 for dozens of luncheon and dinner events a month.

Abramoff's preferred table was Table 40, where Tom DeLay, Dana Rohrabacher, Bob Ney, and John Doolittle were his regular guests, getting their meals comped. Rohrabacher ate as Abramoff's guest at least monthly, claiming the friendship exemption to House ethics rules. Bob Ney paid Signatures about $1,900 for meals and events between 2002 and 2004 in addition to many comped meals. Restaurant records show that Team Abramoff members Neil Volz and Tony Rudy with Tom Hammond organized $1,500 (minimum) dinners for their respective former bosses, Bob Ney and Tom DeLay, in April 2002, though campaign finance records show no payment. Although representatives Roy Blunt (R-Mo.) and Frank A. LoBiondo (R-N.J.) and former senators John Breaux (D-La.), Don Nickles (R) and Tim Hutchinson (R) were also on an Abramoff list of people to be comped, Blunt, LoBiondo, and Breaux deny ever receiving free meals.

Between January 2002 and May 2003, Abramoff and his investors put more than $3 million into Signatures, spending seven percent of the restaurant's revenues on complimentary food and drinks, well above the industry standard.

The official owner of Signatures was Livsar Enterprises, with Rodney Lane as its acting chief executive officer. The registered agent was Yale Ginsburg, an attorney, and Jay Kaplan, also an attorney, led the Signatures restaurant group. According to emails sent by Abramoff in 2001, Capitol Campaign Strategies transferred money to Livsar, which he planned to have under the control of his wife Pamela. Signatures was built by John S. Hillery & Assoc. Const. Inc of Sterling, Virginia, at a cost of $850,000.00.

The original chefs were executive chef Michael Rosen and sous-chef Jeff Ramsey. In 2005, the executive chef was Morou Ouattara. The main dining room seated 104 (50 seats at the bar), and about 50 on the patio. The private dining rooms seated 15 and 25 people. Amenities included rentable wine lockers and an in-house humidor.

The restaurant featured rare document collections of Stan Klos, Edward Bomsey, and other political memorabilia. The documents on display in the restaurant included famous autographs. Most of the items displayed were also for sale. Memorabilia in the restaurant included a rocking chair used by former U.S. president John F. Kennedy (sold for $495,000), a signed replica of Gerald Ford's pardon of Richard Nixon (sold for $5,000), and signed portraits, letters, and photos of Czar Nicholas, Winston Churchill, George Patton, Rocky Marciano, Harry Houdini, Thomas Edison, and Meyer Lansky (all sold for between $5,000 and $10,000).

== External links and references ==
- Austin Bonner (August 4, 2005). "A Seat at Jack Abramoff's Table". TPMCafe. Archived from the original on December 8, 2005.
- Albert Eisele (May 8, 2002). "Signatures: A special place to dine with history". The Hill.
- Glen Justice (July 6, 2005). "For Lobbyist, a Seat of Power Came With a Plate". The New York Times.
- Susan Schmidt and Jeffrey H. Birnbaum (December 26, 2004). "Tribal Money Linked to GOP Fundraising: Skybox Events Were Not Always Reported to FEC". Washington Post. p. A01.
- https://web.archive.org/web/20051003231719/http://img.thehill.com/thehill/export/TheHill/Features/CapitalLiving/110404.html
- http://www.forward.com/campaignconfidential/archives/001782.php
