= Amy Ridenour =

American conservative think tank founder

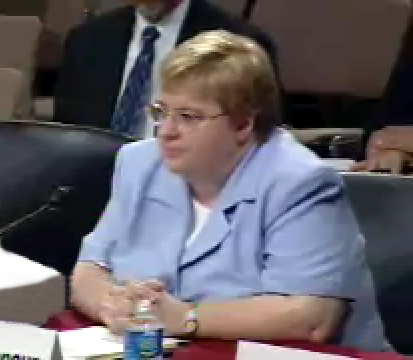
- Ridenour testifying before a hearing of the Senate Indian Affairs Committee on June 22, 2005, with regards to her involvement in the Jack Abramoff scandal
- Born: 9 November 1959
- Died: 31 March 2017 (aged 57)
- Spouse: David A. Ridenour

Amy Moritz Ridenour (November 9, 1959 – March 31, 2017) was an American nonprofit executive who served as president of the National Center for Public Policy Research, a conservative think tank. Ridenour held this post from the organization's founding in 1982 until her death. She wrote a syndicated op-ed column from 1997 and was a frequent radio and television guest.

== Background ==
According to Nina Easton's Gang of Five, Ridenour was a veteran organizer of the College Republican National Committee. She was a candidate in 1981 for election as national chairman of the organization, opposed by Jack Abramoff.

Abramoff, Ralph Reed, and Grover Norquist persuaded Ridenour to drop out of the race by promising her the appointed position of executive director. With the only serious competitor out of the way, Abramoff won the election easily.

Although Ridenour was later rebuffed by the "Abramoff-Norquist-Reed triumvirate" and only given the titular position of "deputy director", she continued to work with the group and became a good friend of Norquist. Abramoff would also later become a director of the National Center for Public Policy Research (NCPPR).

Ridenour was married to David Ridenour.

== National Center for Public Policy Research ==
Ridenour was a founding chief executive officer of the NCPPR in 1982. The NCPPR's stated mission is to promote "the conservative and free market perspective on US domestic, foreign and defense policy issues."
