= Bart Adams =

American golfer

Personal information
- Full name: Bartlett S. Adams
- Born: April 9, 1866 St. Louis, Missouri, U.S.
- Died: August 9, 1944 (aged 78) Fulton, Missouri, U.S.

Sport
- Sport: Golf

Bartlett "Bart" S. Adams (April 9, 1866 – August 9, 1944) was an American golfer. He competed in the 1904 Summer Olympics.

He was a member of the Algonquin Golf Club in St. Louis.
