= Tom Feeney =

American politician (born 1958)

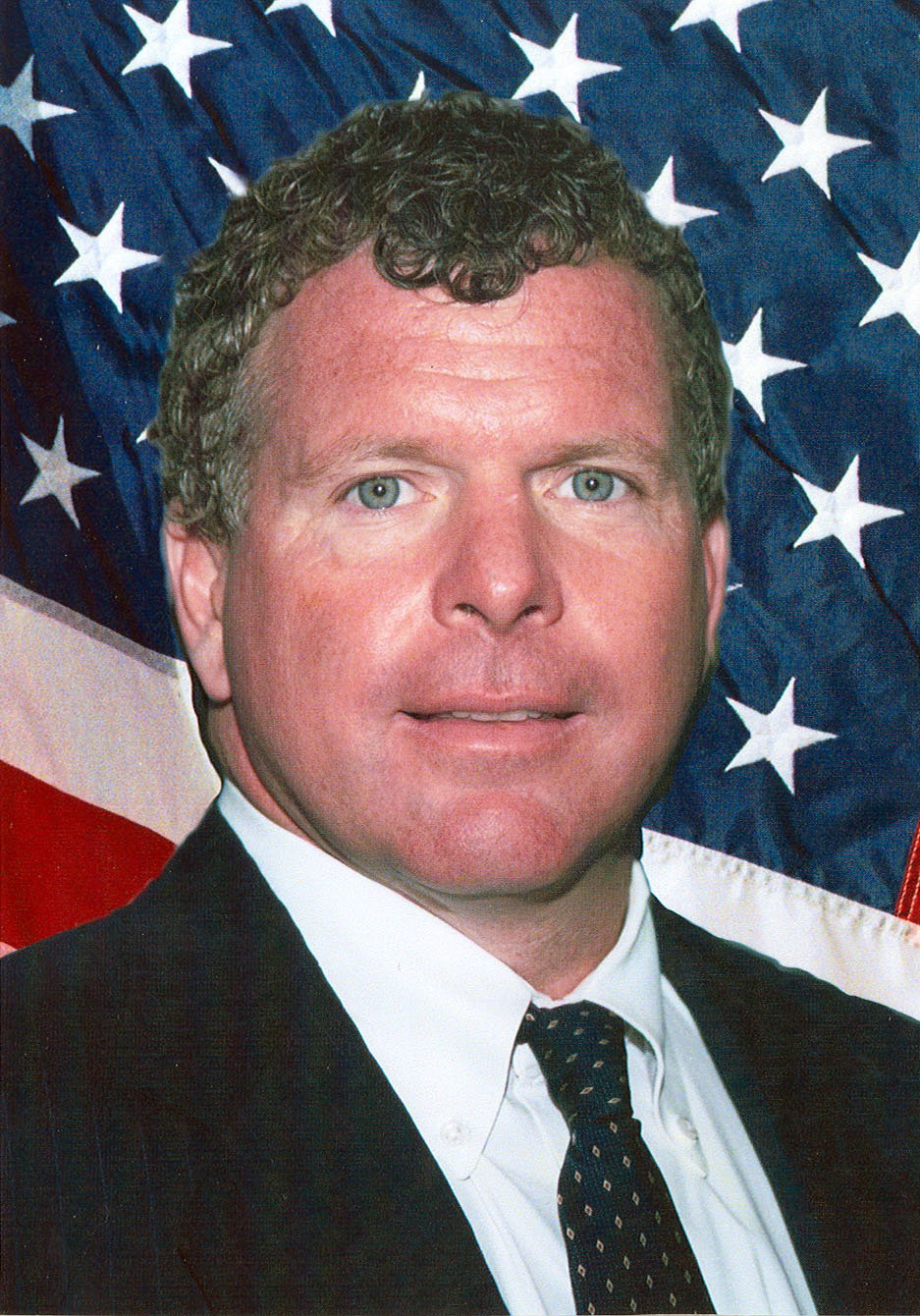
- Official portrait, 2006

Member of the U.S. House of Representatives from Florida's 24th district
- In office January 3, 2003 – January 3, 2009
- Preceded by: constituency established
- Succeeded by: Suzanne Kosmas

91st Speaker of the Florida House of Representatives
- In office November 21, 2000 – November 19, 2002
- Preceded by: John E. Thrasher
- Succeeded by: Johnnie Byrd

Member of the Florida House of Representatives
- In office November 5, 1996 – November 5, 2002
- Preceded by: Marvin Couch
- Succeeded by: Sandy Adams
- Constituency: 33rd
- In office November 3, 1992 – November 8, 1994
- Preceded by: Art Grindle
- Succeeded by: Bob Brooks
- Constituency: 35th
- In office November 6, 1990 – November 3, 1992
- Preceded by: Rich Crotty
- Succeeded by: Lee Constantine
- Constituency: 37th

Personal details
- Born: Thomas Charles Feeney III; May 21, 1958 (age 68) Abington, Pennsylvania, U.S.
- Party: Republican
- Spouse: Ellen Stewart
- Education: Pennsylvania State University (BA); University of Pittsburgh (JD)

Thomas Charles Feeney III (born May 21, 1958) is an American politician from Orlando, Florida. He represented Florida's 24th congressional district. He was defeated in the 2008 election by Democrat Suzanne Kosmas.

== Early life ==
He was born in Abington, Pennsylvania, a suburb of Philadelphia. He graduated from Penn State University in 1980, obtaining a Juris Doctor degree from the University of Pittsburgh School of Law in 1983. Soon afterwards, he moved to Oviedo, Florida, a suburb of Orlando where he still lives, and opened a private practice.

== Florida legislature ==
In 1990, Feeney was elected to the Florida House of Representatives as a Republican from Seminole County. He served two terms there before running for lieutenant governor of Florida as Jeb Bush's running mate in 1994. After the pair narrowly lost, Feeney joined the James Madison Institute, a conservative think tank, as a director. He returned to the Florida House in 1996 and was elected as Speaker of that body in 2000.

Feeney first came to national prominence in 2000, shortly after his election as Speaker, when he led efforts to certify the state's Republican presidential electors even though it was still unclear whether George W. Bush or Al Gore had won the state's electoral votes. Feeney and his colleagues claimed that Florida's electoral votes were in imminent danger of being removed from consideration if the results of the popular vote in the state could not be determined with legal certainty. While Article 2 of the United States Constitution places this power in the legislature, many Democrats insisted that recounts needed to be completed, and that by doing so, a clear legal victor would emerge.

Feeney and then State Senate president John McKay argued the state Supreme Court's verdict in favor of the Democrats' position on recounts essentially "tainted" the entire process, so that there was (as Feeney stated) "a great risk" Florida's electoral votes would be disregarded altogether in the selection of the next President. The U.S. Supreme Court's verdict in Bush v. Gore rejected the argument from uncertainty by a margin of 6–3, and halted the recount process on other grounds. Bush won Florida and the election.

In 2001, Feeney was one of the lawmakers who opposed a demand by Bud Selig that the state finance a new baseball stadium for the Florida Marlins. At that time, Selig had threatened that the Marlins might leave South Florida if they did not receive a tax break.

== U.S. House of Representatives ==
Florida gained two congressional districts after the 2000 census. One of them was the 24th District in the Orlando area. Some have argued that Feeney drew this district for himself, since it included virtually all of his state House district and term limits prohibited him from running for the state House again. (The other new district, the 25th, was drawn for fellow Florida representative Mario Díaz-Balart). He was handily elected in 2002, re-elected unopposed in 2004, and took 58% of the vote in 2006.

=== Political positions ===
Feeney was one of the most conservative members of the House. He drafted a "Principles Card" soon after becoming state house speaker which allowed his fellow Republicans to check if legislation was consistent with conservative principles. He modified this card when he came to Congress, calling it the Conservative Check Card.

Feeney is a staunch advocate of a federal prohibition of online poker. In 2006, he cosponsored H.R. 4777, the Internet Gambling Prohibition and Enforcement Act, and voted for H.R. 4411, the Goodlatte-Leach Internet Gambling Prohibition Act. In 2008, he opposed H.R. 5767, the Payment Systems Protection Act (a bill that sought to place a moratorium on enforcement of the Unlawful Internet Gambling Enforcement Act while the U.S. Treasury Department and the Federal Reserve defined "unlawful Internet gambling"). Despite his ties to the Bush family, Feeney broke with the White House and opposed the Medicare reform package of 2003 since he felt its centerpiece, a prescription drug benefit for senior citizens, was too expensive. He was a founding member of Washington Waste Watchers, a government spending watchdog group.

Feeney cosponsored a non-binding resolution against the use of foreign law in federal courts. When Supreme Court Justice Antonin Scalia said (of the resolution) that "[i]t's none of your business", Feeney said that Scalia's comments were "like being told your favorite baseball player disagrees with your approach to hitting."

=== Committee assignments ===
- Financial Services Committee
  - Subcommittee on Capital Markets, Insurance, and Government Sponsored Enterprises
  - Subcommittee on Financial Institutions and Consumer Credit
- Judiciary Committee
  - Subcommittee on Courts, the Internet, and Intellectual Property
  - Subcommittee on Commercial and Administrative Law
  - Antitrust Task Force and Competition Policy
- Committee on Science and Technology
  - Space and Aeronautics Subcommittee (Ranking Member)
- Assistant Whip

== Awards ==
In 2006, Feeney was named a "Taxpayer Superhero" by the Citizens Against Government Waste.

He received a perfect score from Grover Norquist's Americans for Tax Reform (ATR). He was named "Guardian of Small Business" by the National Federation of Independent Business (NFIB). The National Taxpayers Union presented Feeney with the "Taxpayers' Friend Award" in 2004 and in 2006.

== Controversies ==
In September 2006, Feeney was named one of the "20 Most Corrupt Members of Congress" in a report by Citizens for Responsibility and Ethics in Washington; he was also listed in the first report by the organization in January 2006, when he was one of 13 named members. The organization said "His ethics issues arise from trips he has taken in apparent violation of House travel and gift rules and from his failure to disclosure his ownership of rental property." Feeney was subsequently listed in CREW's 2007 and 2008 reports as well.

=== Trips ===
==== Scotland ====
In August 2003, Feeney took a golfing trip to Scotland. The trip was paid for by former lobbyist (now convicted criminal) Jack Abramoff, who went with Feeney to Scotland. In March 2003, Feeney was one of 10 Republican lawmakers who wrote to the Department of Energy opposing changes to the Energy Star, changes also being fought by an Abramoff client.

In January 2007, Feeney agreed to pay $5,643 to the U.S. Treasury to cover the trip's cost, after the House ethics committee concluded that the trip did not comply with House rules. In April 2007, Federal agents asked the St. Petersburg Times for an email sent to the newspaper by Feeney's office describing the trip.

Feeney was named as "Representative #3" in the Justice Department's April 23, 2007 criminal information against Mark Zachares, a former congressional aide of Representative Don Young. Zachares pleaded guilty to accepting tens of thousands of dollars in gifts from Abramoff. In September 2008, Feeney's campaign ran a television ad in which apologized for his "bad judgment" in taking the trip.

=== Rental property ===
In May 2006, Feeney reported on his personal financial disclosure form that he was the joint owner of a condominium at the Royal Mansions resort in Cape Canaveral, Florida. Feeney listed the purchase date as January 2005, but online records of the Brevard County Appraiser's office show that the sale actually took place in late 2003. The only listed purchaser is James A. "Skip" Fowler, Feeney's former law partner. Fowler said that he and Feeney purchased the condo as an investment, paying a total of $175,000.

Two identically sized units at the resort sold earlier in 2006 for $420,000 and $450,000. According to a note in the Harper's Magazine weblog "Washington Babylon," while not necessarily illegal, Feeney's failure to include the purchase as part of his 2003 financial reporting is a violation of House rules.

=== Election fraud ===
Feeney's 2006 congressional opponent, Clint Curtis, has previously provided an affidavit alleging that in October 2000, Feeney asked Curtis, then a computer programmer at Yang Enterprises, to design a computer program to falsify touch-screen voting results in Palm Beach County. Curtis subsequently passed a polygraph test commissioned by a Washington, D.C. private investigator. A Wired News story noted that Curtis had no direct knowledge of the vote counting software having been used in a public election.

Feeney claimed that he has no recollection of even meeting Curtis; that he could not have engaged in such a scheme because Palm Beach County did not even consider obtaining touch screen machines until after the 2000 election; and that although Curtis wrote a book in the summer of 2004 accusing Feeney of a wide variety of misconduct, Curtis did not mention the alleged scheme to commit election fraud in the edition published prior to the 2004 election.

=== Sealed testimony ===
A three-judge panel of United States circuit judges for the District of Columbia Circuit unanimously refused to allow federal prosecutors to subpoena Feeney's sealed testimony which he had provided to the House Ethics Committee. In July 2009, Brett Kavanaugh, one of the judges on the panel, called for an en banc review of the circuit's prior precedent by all of the judges in the D.C. Circuit.

== 2006 re-election campaign ==
In 2006, Feeney faced Democrat Clint Curtis in the November general election. In September, Feeney's campaign launched a website that depicts Curtis in a mental institution wearing a tinfoil hat. Curtis claimed that the attention was actually helping him. The website in question was created by a political consultant, Ralph Gonzales.

Feeney refused to debate Curtis. He said it would be a disservice to voters to do so. He also said that to hold the debate would acknowledge there were two credible candidates in the race. Curtis countered that Feeney was ducking him.

In early October, Feeney's campaign sent out flyers to 110,000 voters that showed Curtis' head superimposed on the body of Playboy publisher Hugh Hefner. The flyer also mentioned Larry Flynt and Hustler magazine. Feeney said he was using such tactics to inform the voters that Flynt had endorsed Curtis. Curtis responded that he has never met Flynt or anyone at Hustler. Feeney was re-elected with 58 percent of the vote in 2006.

== 2008 re-election campaign ==
In June 2007, Feeney's district was one of five in Florida that Democrats hoped to win from the Republicans in 2008. Despite the perception that Feeney drew it for himself, it had a Cook Partisan Voting Index of R+3, making it a fairly marginal district on paper. The district gave George W. Bush 52% of the vote in 2000, and 56% in 2004. It included much of Democratic-leaning Volusia County.

Feeney faced former state representative Suzanne Kosmas in the November election. Kosmas and Feeney served together in the State House from 1996 to 2003, representing neighboring districts. In a poll released on September 18, 2008, Kosmas had 42% of the vote, compared to 43% for Feeney, with the remaining voters undecided. Filings with the Federal Election Commission showed that Feeney had raised $1.5 million as of August 6, compared to $1.2 million by Kosmas, and that Feeney had $804,000 on hand as of that date, compared to $836,000 for Kosmas.

Kosmas attacked Feeney's ties to Abramoff, which helped her quickly gain her traction. The Orlando Sentinel endorsed Kosmas, suggesting Feeney was too conservative for the district. An internal poll for the Democratic Congressional Campaign Committee showed Kosmas leading Feeney by 23 points, 58% to 35%. Congressional Quarterly had rated the contest as "No Clear Favorite" for most of the campaign, but changed it to "Leans Democratic" in its closing weeks. In the November election, Feeney was defeated, taking 41% of the vote to Kosmas' 57% – the largest margin of defeat for a Republican incumbent in the 2008 cycle.

== Electoral history ==
Florida's 10th congressional district: Results 2002-2008
Year	Republican	Votes	Pct	Democrat	Votes	Pct	Third Party	Votes	Pct
2002	Tom Feeney	135,576	62%	Harry Jacobs	83,667	38%			
2004	Tom Feeney (inc.)	Unopposed	100%						
2006	Tom Feeney (inc.)	123,795	58%	Clint Curtis	89,863	42%			
2008	Tom Feeney (inc.)	151,863	41%	Suzanne Kosmas	211,284	57%	Gaurav Bhola	6,223	2%

Party political offices
Preceded by Allison DeFoor	Republican nominee for Lieutenant Governor of Florida; 1994	Succeeded by Frank Brogan
Political offices
Preceded by John E. Thrasher	Speaker of the Florida House of Representatives; 2000–2002	Succeeded by Johnnie Byrd
U.S. House of Representatives
New constituency	Member of the U.S. House of Representatives from Florida's 24th congressional district 2003–2009	Succeeded by Suzanne Kosmas
U.S. order of precedence (ceremonial)
Preceded by Joe Scarborough as Former U.S. Representative	Order of precedence of the United States as Former U.S. Representative	Succeeded by Alan Grayson as Former U.S. Representative
