= Jack Abramoff =

American lobbyist (born 1959)

- Abramoff in 2011

Chair of the College Republican National Committee
- In office 1981–1985
- Preceded by: Steve Gibble
- Succeeded by: Ted Higgins

Personal details
- Born: Jack Allan Abramoff; February 28, 1959 (age 67) Atlantic City, New Jersey, U.S.
- Party: Republican
- Spouse: Pamela Clarke Alexander (m. 1986)
- Children: 5
- Education: Brandeis University (BA); Georgetown University (JD)
- Occupation: Lobbyist; businessman; film producer; writer
- Known for: Jack Abramoff Indian lobbying scandal
- Website: Official website (Broken link 9/29/2026)
- Criminal information
- Status: Released December 3, 2010
- Criminal charges: Fraud, conspiracy, tax evasion
- Penalty: 5 years and 10 months imprisonment

Jack Allan Abramoff (/ˈeɪbrəmɒf/; born February 28, 1959) is an American lobbyist, businessman, film producer, writer, and convicted felon. He was at the center of an extensive federal corruption investigation, which resulted in his conviction and 21 others either pleading guilty or being found guilty, including White House officials J. Steven Griles and David Safavian, U.S. Representative Bob Ney, and nine other lobbyists and congressional aides.

Abramoff was national chairman of the College Republican National Committee from 1981 to 1985; a founding member of the International Freedom Foundation, allegedly financed by the apartheid-era government of South Africa; and served on the board of directors of National Center for Public Policy Research, a conservative think tank. From 1994 through 2001, he was a top lobbyist for the firm of Preston Gates & Ellis and subsequently for Greenberg Traurig until March 2004.

After a guilty plea in the Jack Abramoff Native American lobbying scandal and his dealings with SunCruz Casinos in January 2006, he was sentenced to six years in federal prison for mail fraud, conspiracy to bribe public officials and tax evasion. He served 43 months before being released on December 3, 2010. After his release from prison, he wrote the autobiographical book Capitol Punishment: The Hard Truth About Washington Corruption From America's Most Notorious Lobbyist, published in November 2011.

Abramoff's lobbying and the scandals and investigation associated with it have been the subject of two films, Casino Jack and the United States of Money, released in May 2010, and Casino Jack, released on December 17, 2010, with Kevin Spacey starring as Abramoff.

== Early life and education ==
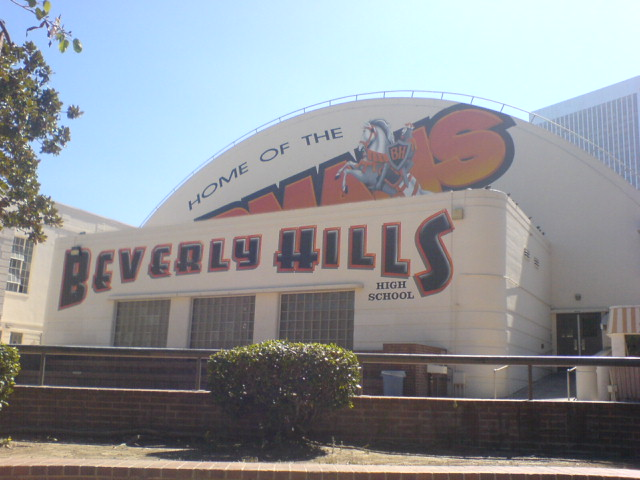
Beverly Hills High School, where Abramoff played high school football and was a weightlifting champion before entering Brandeis University and then Georgetown University Law Center

Abramoff was born February 28, 1959, in Atlantic City, New Jersey, to parents Jane (née Divac) and Franklin Abramoff, who was president of the franchises unit of Diners Club International. Abramoff is Jewish.

In 1969, when Abramoff was ten years old, his family moved to Beverly Hills, California. After seeing the film version of Fiddler on the Roof two years later, at age twelve, Abramoff decided to practice Orthodox Judaism.

Abramoff attended Beverly Hills High School, where he played football and was a weightlifting champion. In 2007, Jonathan Gold, a Pulitzer Prize-winning food critic for The Los Angeles Times who attended Beverly Hills High School at the same time, recounted an incident in which Abramoff pushed him and his cello down a flight of stairs. The incident was reported by The Jewish Journal of Greater Los Angeles under the headline, "Jack Abramoff the bully".

Abramoff attended Brandeis University, where he was elected treasurer of the Brandeis College Republicans. In April 1980, Abramoff was elected chairman of the Massachusetts Alliance of College Republicans, a student volunteer organization then working for Ronald Reagan's 1980 presidential campaign. Abramoff cited the Massachusetts College Republicans' role in Reagan's close victory in the state as a "major factor", claiming that "Reagan spent only $25,000 in the state and won by a mere 3000 votes. Five thousand (members of the) College Republicans produced thousands of votes for him".

In 1981, Abramoff graduated from Brandeis with a B.A. in English, and enrolled in Georgetown University Law Center, where he earned his Juris Doctor degree in 1986.

According to Nina Easton, who authored a 2001 biography on Abramoff and several other conservatives, Abramoff gained much of his credibility in the conservative movement through his father, Franklin Abramoff, who, as president of Diners Club International, worked closely with Alfred S. Bloomingdale, a personal friend of Reagan.

=== College Republican National Chairman ===
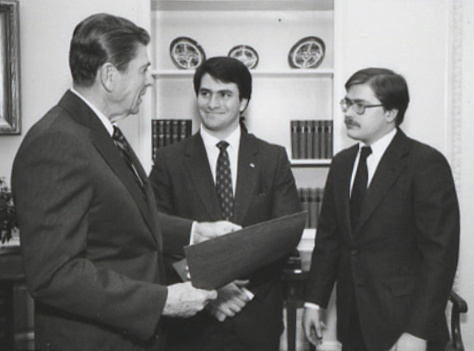
Abramoff, then chairman of the College Republican National Committee, and Grover Norquist, then its executive director, meeting with President Reagan in the Oval Office in December 1981

After graduating from Brandeis, Abramoff ran for election as chairman of the College Republican National Committee (CRNC). After a campaign, which cost over $11,000 and was managed by Grover Norquist, Abramoff won the election. His chief competitor, Amy Moritz, was persuaded to drop out; later, as Amy Ridenour, she became a founding director of the National Center for Public Policy Research and was treated to several trips funded by Jack Abramoff when Abramoff was a federal lobbyist. Abramoff "changed the direction of the [college] committee and made it more activist and conservative than ever before", CRNC notes. "It is not our job to seek peaceful coexistence with the Left," Abramoff was quoted as writing in the group's 1983 annual report. "Our job is to remove them from power permanently."

Norquist served as executive director of the College Republican National Committee under Abramoff, and Abramoff later recruited Ralph Reed, a former president of the University of Georgia's College Republicans chapter, as an unpaid intern. According to Reed's book Active Faith, Reed introduced Abramoff to Pamela Clarke Alexander, who Abramoff later married.

In August 1984, as CRNC chairman, Abramoff addressed the 1984 Republican National Convention in Dallas, which nominated Reagan as the party's nominee and for reelection in the 1984 presidential election.

=== Long-standing college political alliances ===
At the CRNC, Abramoff developed political alliances with College Republican chapter presidents across the nation, many who went on to hold key roles in state and national politics and business and some who later interacted with Abramoff in his role as a lobbyist. Some of those relationships were later at the core of the federal investigation.

At the CRNC, Abramoff, Norquist, and Reed formed an aggressive alliance known as the "Abramoff-Norquist-Reed triumvirate". After Abramoff's election, the trio purged "dissidents" and rewrote the CRNC's bylaws to consolidate their control over the organization. According to Easton's biography, Gang of Five, Reed was the "hatchet man" and "carried out Abramoff-Norquist orders with ruthless efficiency, not bothering to hide his fingerprints".

In 1983, the CRNC passed a resolution condemning "deliberate planted propaganda by the KGB and Soviet proxy forces" against the government of South Africa when the country's government was under worldwide criticism for apartheid.

In 1984, Abramoff and other College Republicans formed USA Foundation, a non-partisan tax-exempt organization, which held two days of rallies on college campuses around the nation celebrating the first anniversary of the United States invasion of Grenada. In a letter to campus Republican leaders at the time, Abramoff wrote:

While the Student Liberation Day Coalition is nonpartisan and intended only for educational purposes, I don't need to tell you how important this project is to our efforts as [College Republicans]. I am confident that an impartial study of the contrasts between the Carter/Mondale failure in Iran and the Reagan victory in Grenada will be most enlightening to voters 12 days before the general election.

=== Citizens for America ===
In 1985, Abramoff joined Citizens for America, a pro-Reagan group that helped Oliver North build support for the Contras in Nicaragua. Citizens for America staged an unprecedented meeting of anti-Communist rebel leaders, known as the Democratic International in Jamba, Angola, which included leaders of the Afghan mujahideen from Afghanistan, UNITA from Angola, the Contras, and opposition groups from Laos. The largely ceremonial conference led to the development of the International Freedom Foundation. Abramoff helped organize the conference, and participated in it.

Abramoff later departed Citizens for America when the organization's primary sponsor, Lewis Lehrman, a former New York gubernatorial candidate, concluded that Abramoff had spent the organization's money carelessly.

In 1986, Reagan appointed Abramoff to the United States Holocaust Memorial Council.

== Film producer ==
Abramoff subsequently spent a decade in Hollywood, where he developed, wrote, and produced, with his brother Robert, the 1989 film Red Scorpion. The film, which cost $16 million and exceeded its $8 million initial budget, starred Dolph Lundgren, who played the Spetsnaz Soviet commando Nikolai, sent to Africa by the Soviet Union to assassinate an Africa revolutionary in a country similar to Angola. Nikolai sees the evil of the Soviets and changes sides, becoming a freedom fighter on the African side. Abramoff also served as executive producer to the film's sequel, Red Scorpion 2, which was released in 1994.

The South African government financed the film through the International Freedom Foundation, a group chaired by Abramoff, as part of its efforts to undermine international support for the African National Congress. The filming location was in South West Africa, now Namibia.

In April 1998, Abramoff wrote a letter to the editor of The Seattle Times, rebutting an article critical of him and his alleged role as effectively a public relations puppet of the apartheid-led South African Defence Force, writing:

The IFF was a conservative group which I headed. It was vigorously anti-Communist, but it was also actively anti-apartheid. In 1987, it was one of the first conservative groups to call for the release of Nelson Mandela, a position for which it was roundly criticized by other conservatives at the time. While I headed the IFF, we accepted funding only from private individuals and corporations and would have absolutely rejected any offer of South African military funding, or any other kind of funding from any government – good or evil.

During this period in South Africa, Abramoff met David Lapin, a South African-born rabbi who later became Abramoff's religious advisor. He also met Lapin's brother and fellow rabbi Daniel Lapin, who allegedly introduced Abramoff to U.S. Representative Tom DeLay (R-TX) at a Washington, D.C. dinner shortly after the Republican takeover of Congress in 1994, though Lapin later said he did not recall making the introduction.

== Lobbyist ==
=== Preston Gates Ellis & Rouvelas Meeds ===
In December 1994, Abramoff was hired as a lobbyist at Preston Gates Ellis & Rouvelas Meeds LLP, the lobbying arm of the Seattle-based law firm Preston Gates & Ellis LLP. According to The Seattle Times, following the Republican takeover of Congress in 1995, the firm's partner Emanuel Rouvelas concluded that the firm "didn't have a conservative, Christian Coalition Republican with strong ties to the new Republican leadership." The traditionally Democratic-leaning firm hired Abramoff for the specific purpose of attaining these ties, which the firm sought to serve and expand its federal lobbying practice. Abramoff was described in a press release as having close ties to Newt Gingrich and Dick Armey, the former Republican Speaker of the House and Republican House Majority Leader, respectively.

In February 2006, The Seattle Times reported that Abramoff used Preston Gates & Ellis to access a higher pedigree of clientele.

==== Choctaw gambling ====
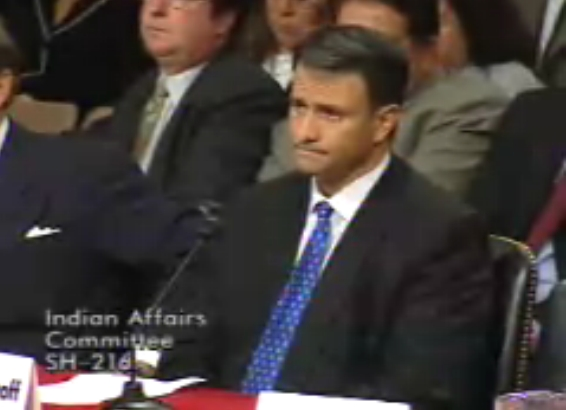
"Jack Abramoff liked to slip into dialogue from The Godfather as he led his lobbying colleagues in planning their next conquest on Capitol Hill. In a favorite bit, he would mimic ice-cold Michael Corleone facing down a crooked U.S. Senator's demand for a cut of mafia gambling profits: 'Senator, you can have my answer now if you like. My offer is this: nothing'", the Washington Post reported in December 2005

In 1995, Abramoff began representing Native American tribes with gambling interests. He became involved with the Mississippi Band of Choctaw Indians, a federally-recognized tribe. One of Abramoff's first acts as a tribal gaming lobbyist was defeating a Congressional bill to tax Native American casinos, sponsored by Bill Archer (R-TX) and Ernest Istook (R-OK). According to Washington Business Forward, a lobbying trade magazine, "Tom DeLay was a major factor in those victories, and the fight helped cement the alliance between the two men." DeLay has called Abramoff "one of (his) closest and dearest friends".

On December 29, 2005, The Washington Post reported, "Jack Abramoff liked to slip into dialogue from The Godfather as he led his lobbying colleagues in planning their next conquest on Capitol Hill. In a favorite bit, he would mimic an ice-cold Michael Corleone facing down a crooked U.S. Senator's demand for a cut of Mafia gambling profits: 'Senator, you can have my answer now if you like. My offer is this: nothing.'"

Thomas Frank, a political writer for Salon.com, contends that Abramoff acted as a con man. Alex Gibney, director and writer of the 2010 documentary film Casino Jack and the United States of Money, described Abramoff's criminal modus operandi, saying, "one of his (Abramoff's) great gifts was being able to tell people what they wanted to hear, and this was how he was able to sell things and get them into trouble." Frank, former U.S. Representative Bob Ney (R-OH), and former Greenberg Traurig lobbyist Neil Volz discussed Abramoff on Kojo Nnamdi's NPR radio show on WAMU-FM.

==== Saipan and Northern Mariana Islands ====
Abramoff and his law firm were paid at least $6.7 million by the Commonwealth of the Northern Mariana Islands (CNMI) between 1995 and 2001. The Northern Mariana Islands manufactured goods labeled "Made in the USA", which were not subject to U.S. labor and minimum wage laws. After Abramoff paid for DeLay and his staffers to visit the Marianas, they crafted legislation that extended exemptions from federal immigration and labor laws to the islands' industries. Abramoff also negotiated with the Marianas for a $1.2 million no-bid contract for "promoting ethics in government", which was awarded to David Lapin, brother of his associate Daniel Lapin.

Abramoff secretly funded a trip to the Marianas for U.S. Representatives James E. Clyburn (D-SC) and Bennie Thompson (D-MS). In 1999, U.S. Representative Dana Rohrabacher (R-CA) participated in an Abramoff-funded trip to the Marshall Islands with U.S. Representatives John Doolittle (R-CA) and Ken Calvert (R-CA), delegates from Guam, American Samoa, and the Virgin Islands, and eight staffers.

Abramoff's lobbying team helped prepare statements by U.S. Representative Ralph Hall's (R-TX), delivered on the floor of the U.S. House of Representatives, which attacked the credibility of escaped teenaged sex worker named Katrina in an attempt to discredit her testimony regarding the state of the sex slave industry in the Marianas. In a major article in its Spring 2006 issue, Ms. magazine reported on Abramoff's dealings in the Marianas and the plight of garment workers like Katrina.

Abramoff arranged for Ralph Reed's marketing company to mail Christian conservative voters, and he bribed Roger Stillwell, a high-ranking political appointee at the U.S. Department of the Interior who was responsible for some Native American gaming policies. Stillwell pleaded guilty in 2006 to accepting gifts from Abramoff. Federal government officials and employees are prohibited from accepting gifts from consultants, businesses, and lobbyists.

==== Naftasib ====
Naftasib, a Russia-based energy company, funneled almost $3.4 million to Abramoff and DeLay advisor Ed Buckham between 1997 and 2005. About $60,000 was spent on a trip to Russia in 1997 for DeLay, Buckham, and Abramoff. In 1998, $1 million was sent to Buckham via U.S. Family Network, Buckham's organization, to "influence DeLay's vote in 1998 on legislation that helped make it possible for the International Monetary Fund to bail out the faltering Russian economy". DeLay voted for the legislation. The money was funneled through the Dutch company Voor Huisen, the Bahamas company Chelsea Enterprises, and the London law firm James & Sarch Co.

The Naftasib executives involved, who met DeLay during the 1997 trip, were Marina Nevskaya and Alexander Koulakovsky. Nevskaya was also involved in Abramoff's support of an Israeli military academy, according to an email sent to Abramoff.

==== eLottery, Inc. ====
In 1999, eLottery hired Abramoff to block the Internet Gambling Prohibition Act, which did in part by enlisting Ralph Reed, Norquist, and Tom DeLay's former chief of staff, Tony Rudy.

Emails from 2000 indicate that Susan Ralston helped Abramoff pass checks from eLottery to Lou Sheldon's Traditional Values Coalition (TVC) and Norquist's Americans for Tax Reform (ATR), en route to Reed's company, Century Strategies.

=== Greenberg Traurig ===
In January 2001, Abramoff left Preston Gates to join the government relations practice of Greenberg Traurig in Washington, D.C. The firm described Abramoff as "directly involved in the Republican Party and conservative movement leadership structures" and "one of the leading fund raisers for the party and its congressional candidates". When he moved to Greenberg Traurig, Abramoff took as much as $6 million worth of client business from his old firm, including the Marianas Islands account, to the new firm. At Greenberg Traurig, Abramoff recruited a team of lobbyists known as "Team Abramoff", which included many of his former employees from Preston Gates and former senior U.S. Congress staff members.

==== Tribal lobbying ====
Abramoff's Tribal Clients
Agua Caliente Band of Cahuilla Indians

Cherokee Nation of Oklahoma

Chitimacha Tribe of Louisiana

Coushatta Tribe of Louisiana

Mashpee Wampanoag people of Massachusetts

Mississippi Band of Choctaw Native Americans

Pueblo of Sandia

Pueblo of Santa Clara

Saginaw Chippewa Native American Tribe of Michigan

Tigua Native American Reservation

After joining Greenberg Traurig, Abramoff chose to focus even more extensively on securing Native American tribes as clients. While Abramoff was a registered lobbyist for 51 clients at Preston Gates, only four were Indian tribes. At Greenberg Traurig, Abramoff eventually represented 24 clients, according to lobbyist registration records, seven of which were Indian tribes.

==== Tyco International Ltd. ====
In December 2002, Timothy Flanigan, former White House counsel, left his job to join Tyco International as the company's general counsel for corporate and international law. Flanigan immediately hired Abramoff to lobby Congress and the White House on matters relating to Tyco's Bermuda tax-exempt status. Flanigan told the U.S. Senate Judiciary Committee that Abramoff "bragged" that he could help Tyco avoid tax liability aimed at offshore companies because he "had good relationships with members of Congress".

In August 2005, Tyco Inc. claimed that Abramoff was paid $1.7 million for "astroturfing", which is the creation of a fake grassroots campaigns. Abramoff used them to oppose proposals to penalize U.S. corporations registered abroad for tax reasons. The work allegedly was never performed, and most of the fees Tyco paid Abramoff to lobby against the legislation was "diverted to entities controlled by Mr. Abramoff".

==== Foreign governments ====
Abramoff's team represented the government of Malaysia, and worked toward improving Malaysian political and trade relations with the U.S.

Abramoff also met with the government of Sudan, offering it a plan to deflect criticism from U.S. Christian groups concerned about Sudan's role in the Darfur conflict. Abramoff promised to enlist Reed to launch a grassroots campaign to improve the image of Sudan in the United States.

==== Channel One News ====
Between 1999 and 2003, Abramoff was a lobbyist for the school television news service Channel One News, which retained Abramoff to ensure Congress did not block funds to their service. Channel One faced frequent campaigns by political groups to persuade Congress to limit its presence in schools, but it also derived much of its advertising revenue from U.S. government sources, including the Office of National Drug Control Policy and military recruitment. When Abramoff and Channel One parted ways, Channel One's advertising revenues dropped substantially, but a cause-and-effect relationship was difficult to prove.

==== Telecommunications firm ====
In October 2005, The Washington Post reported that Bob Ney, chair of the U.S. House Administration Committee, approved a license for Israel-based telecommunications company in 2002 to install antennas for the U.S. House of Representatives. The company, which was then named Foxcom Wireless and was an Israeli start-up telecommunications firm, later relocated its headquarters from Jerusalem to Vienna, Virginia, where it was renamed MobileAccess Networks. The company paid Abramoff $280,000 for lobbying and donated $50,000 to Capital Athletic Foundation, a charity Abramoff sometimes used to secretly pay for lobbying activities. In Michael Scanlon's plea agreement, these activities were described as public corruption.

=== Skyboxes, "Signatures", and Scotland ===
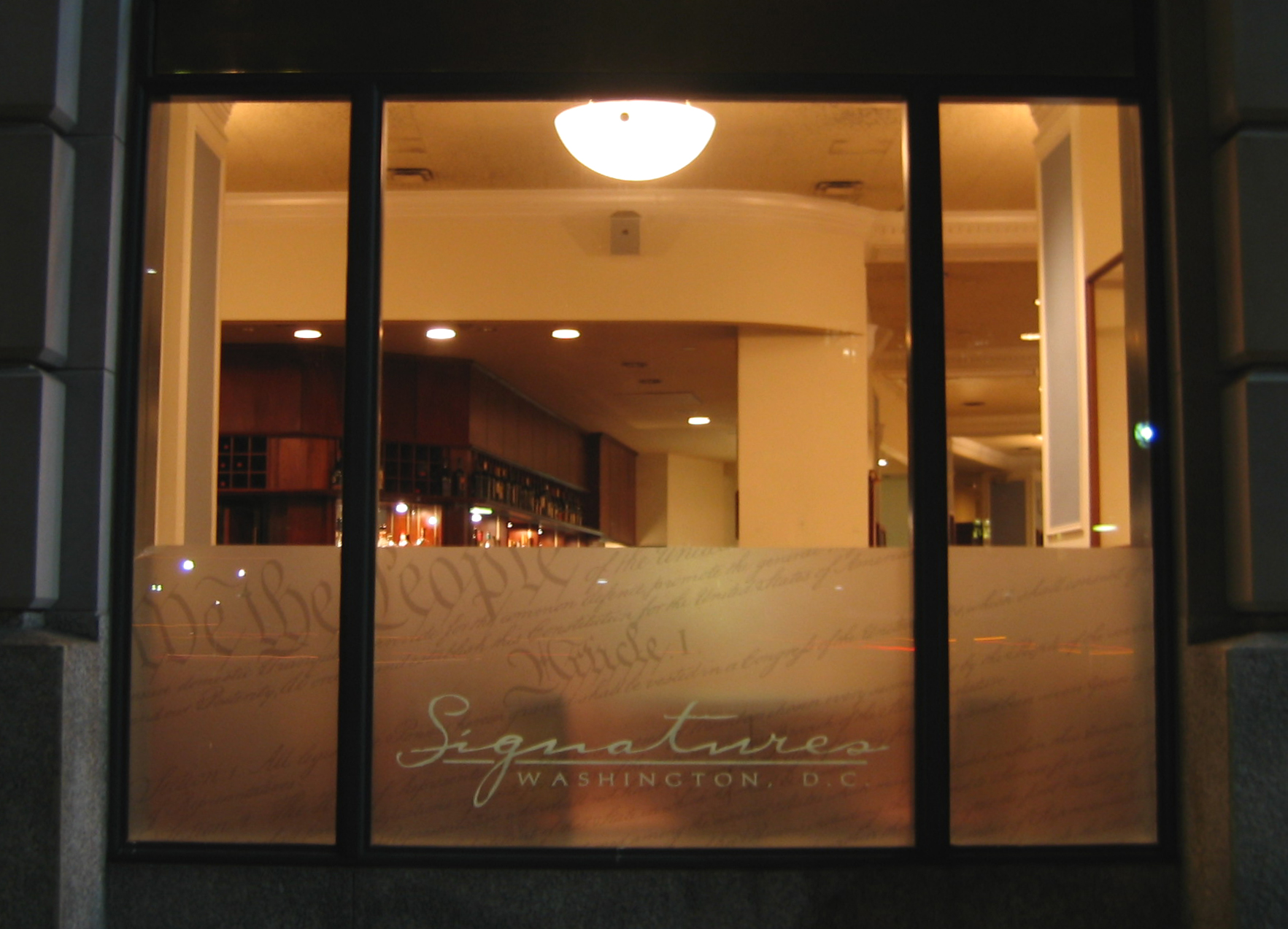
Abramoff's since closed restaurant Signatures in the Penn Quarter neighborhood of Washington, D.C.

Abramoff spent over $1 million to maintain four luxury skyboxes at major sports arenas, which he used for political entertaining and hosting fundraisers, including events for politicians publicly opposed to gambling, including U.S. Representative John Doolittle (R-CA).

In 2001, U.S. Senate Finance Committee Ranking Member Max Baucus (R-MT) returned $18,892 in contributions, which his office found to be connected to Abramoff, including an estimated $1,892 that was never reported for Baucus' use of Abramoff's Washington, D.C. skybox at a professional sports arena and concert venue earlier that year.

Abramoff also co-owned Signatures, a high-end Washington, D.C. restaurant, which he used to reward friends and associates. Kevin A. Ring, a lobbyist colleague of Abramoff's, gave U.S. Department of Justice official Robert E. Coughlin free tickets to the skyboxes and took him out to Signatures multiple times in exchange for favors. The restaurant, once thriving, was closed once investigations closed in on Abramoff.

In 2000, 2002, and 2003, DeLay, Ney, and Tom Feeney (R-FL) participated in golf trips to Scotland with Abramoff, which were arranged or funded by Abramoff. Ney and Feeney claimed their trips were paid for by the National Center for Public Policy Research, but the group denied it, and spokespeople for Ney and Feeney blamed others for filing errors. Ney later pleaded guilty to knowing that Abramoff paid for the trip.

David H. Safavian, then chief of staff at the General Services Administration (GSA) during the Bush administration, was convicted of lying and obstruction of justice in connection with the Abramoff investigation. Safavian traveled to Scotland with Reed and Ney on a golf outing arranged by Abramoff, and was accused of concealing from federal investigators information about Abramoff's plans to do business with the GSA at the time of the trip and Abramoff's efforts to find property for his private religious school, Eshkol Academy, for one of his tribal clients. However, this conviction was overturned on appeal.

== Bush administration access ==
Abramoff was a highly influential figure as lobbyist and activist during the Bush administration. In 2001, Abramoff was a member of the Bush administration's 2001 Transition Advisory Team assigned to the Department of the Interior. Abramoff befriended the incoming Deputy Secretary of the Interior J. Steven Griles.

The draft report of the House Government Reform Committee said the documents, which largely included Abramoff's billing records and e-mails, listed 485 lobbying contacts between Abramoff and White House officials over three years, including ten with Karl Rove, a senior White House advisor to Bush. Among the 485 contacts listed, 345 were described as meetings or other in-person contacts, 71 were described as phone conversations, and 69 were e-mail exchanges.

In the first ten months of 2001, the Abramoff lobbying team logged almost 200 contacts with the Bush administration. He may have used these senior level contacts to assist in his lobbying for Indian tribes on tribal gaming matters. The Department of the Interior has federal regulatory authority over tribal affairs, including tribal recognition and gaming. Between 2000 and 2003, six Indian tribes paid Abramoff over $80 million in lobbying fees.

The Department of the Interior Office of Insular Affairs, which has authority over policy and grants to U.S. territories such as the Commonwealth of the Northern Mariana Islands (CNMI), may have aided Abramoff in lobbying for textile interests in the islands. U.S. Senator Conrad Burns (R-MT) and DeLay also heavily lobbied the CNMI in opposing the minimum wage.

In 2003, Abramoff asked for $9 million from Omar Bongo, the president of Gabon, to arrange a meeting with Bush, and directed his fees to GrassRoots Interactive, an Abramoff-controlled lobbying firm. Bongo met with Bush in the Oval Office on May 26, 2004 though no evidence emerged that Abramoff had a role in organizing the meeting, or that he received any money or had a signed contract with Gabon. White House and State Department officials described Bush's meeting with Bongo, whose government was regularly accused by the United States of human rights abuses, as routine, and said they knew of no involvement by Abramoff in arranging it. Officials at Gabon's embassy in Washington, D.C. did not respond to written questions.

Susan Ralston was Rove's assistant in the White House and previously an administrative assistant to both Abramoff and Reed.

According to Mahathir Mohamad, the former prime minister of Malaysia, Abramoff was paid $1.2 million to arrange a meeting between Mahathir and Bush, allegedly at the direction of the Heritage Foundation. Mahathir insisted that someone unknown to him paid for the meeting.

On May 9, 2001, Chief Raul Garza of the Kickapoo tribe in Texas, joined by Abramoff and Norquist, met with Bush. Abramoff was identified in the background of a photo taken at the meeting. Days before the meeting, the tribe paid $25,000 to Norquist's Americans for Tax Reform (ATR) at Abramoff's direction. According to the organization's communications director, John Kartch, the meeting was one of several gatherings ATR sponsored with Bush. The same day, the chief of the Louisiana Coushattas also attended an ATR-sponsored gathering with Bush. The Coushattas paid $25,000 to ATR soon before the event.

A letter from ATR to the Kickapoos, dated May 10, 2001, thanking the Kickapoos for their contribution, was revealed by The New York Times in 2006 by former council elder Isidro Garza, who with Raul Garza (no relation), was under indictment in Texas for embezzling tribal money. According to Isidro Garza, Abramoff did not say the donation was required to meet Bush, and the White House denied any knowledge of the transaction.

Other photos surfaced of Abramoff and Bush meeting at the White House and the Oval Office from either December 22 or 23, 2002, which were found on a site that published pictures of governmental events, ReflectionsOrders.com. The owner of the site removed the photos almost immediately when the presence of Abramoff and Bush together was discovered. Some Internet users located the photos and preserved copies of some of them. The owner of the site gave thousands of dollars to the Bush campaign and Republican National Committee, according to public FEC contribution records.

In March 2006, NPR reported, "... Abramoff recently granted a rare press interview to Vanity Fair magazine, where he asserts President Bush and other prominent figures in Washington know him very well. He called them liars for denying contact with him."

In June 2006, unknown to Abramoff's attorneys or federal prosecutors, Abramoff began secretly granting exclusive interviews to Gary S. Chafetz, a former investigative reporter with The Boston Globe. The interviews, which occurred before and during Abramoff's incarceration, continued through May 2008. In September 2008, Chafetz's book, The Perfect Villain: John McCain and the Demonization of Lobbyist Jack Abramoff, was rushed into print prior to the 2008 presidential election. In the book, Chafetz asserts that Abramoff, though guilty of some of the charges, was the victim of misleading and sensational reporting by The Washington Post, vengeance and mendacity on the part of U.S. Senator John McCain (R-AZ), and strong-arm tactics of the U.S. Department of Justice, which forced Abramoff to confess to crimes Abramoff said he did not believe he committed. Chafetz also accused federal prosecutors of abusive and possibly illegal tactics in their reliance on private and public honest services fraud, which he characterized as vague and controversial.

== Abramoff organizations ==
Abramoff has founded or run several non-profit organizations, including Capital Athletic Foundation and Eshkol Academy, lobbying firms, and political think tanks, including American International Center, GrassRoots Interactive, and the National Center for Public Policy Research. While these organizations had varying degrees of legitimate activities, Abramoff used them to channel millions of dollars to recipients unrelated to the organizations.

=== Capital Athletic Foundation and Eshkol Academy ===
Although federal tax records show that various Indian tribes donated over $6 million to the Capital Athletic Foundation, less than one percent of the money went to athletic programs, which was the foundation's stated purpose. The majority of the funds went to the Eshkol Academy in Maryland, an Orthodox Jewish school founded by Abramoff in 2002. Hundreds of thousands of dollars from CAF were also spent on golf trips to Scotland for Abramoff, Ney, Reed, Safavian, and for purchases of camping equipment sent to a high school friend. Abramoff solicited Safavian's help in looking for property deals for Eshkol Academy and tribal clients, leading to Safavian's conviction.

=== GrassRoots Interactive and Kay Gold ===
GrassRoots Interactive, now defunct, was a small Silver Spring, Maryland-based lobbying firm controlled by Abramoff and PJ Johnson. Millions of dollars flowed into GrassRoots Interactive in 2003, the year it was created, and then flowed out from the firm to unusual places. At least $2.3 million went to a California-based consulting firm that used the same address as the law office of Abramoff's brother, Robert. A separate $400,000 check from GrassRoots was made out to Kay Gold LLC, another Abramoff family company.

=== Maldon Institute ===
Abramoff was a board member, secretary, and treasurer of Maldon Institute for at least five years from 1999 to 2003. He was one of only four board members, including ohn Rees and PJ Johnson.

== Scandal and criminal investigations ==
In late 2004, the U.S. Senate Indian Affairs Committee began investigating Abramoff's lobbying on behalf of American Indian tribes and casinos. In September, he was called to testify before the committee to answer questions about that work, but refused to answer questions, citing Fifth Amendment protections.

=== SunCruz Casinos fraud conviction ===
On August 11, 2005, Abramoff and Adam Kidan were indicted by a federal grand jury in Fort Lauderdale, Florida, on fraud charges arising from a 2000 deal to buy SunCruz Casinos from Gus Boulis. Abramoff and Kidan were accused of using a fake wire transfer to make lenders believe that they had made a $23 million down payment, in order to qualify for a $60 million loan. Ney also was implicated in helping to consummate the deal.

After the partners purchased SunCruz in September 2000, the business relationship with Boulis deteriorated, culminating in a fistfight between Kidan and Boulis in December 2000. In February 2001, Boulis was murdered in his car in a Mafia-style attack. The murder investigation included three individuals who received payments from Kidan. Two of the suspects received life sentences for murder, and a third associate pleaded guilty to conspiracy to commit murder and was sentenced to six and a half years time served after he testified against his co-conspirators.

On January 4, 2006, Abramoff pleaded guilty to conspiracy and wire fraud in Miami, related to the SunCruz deal. The plea agreement called for a maximum sentence of over seven years and would run concurrently with the sentence in the Washington, D.C. corruption case, but could be reduced if Abramoff cooperated fully. The remaining four counts in the Florida indictment were dismissed.

On March 29, 2006, Abramoff and Kidan were both sentenced in the SunCruz case to the minimum amount of 70 months, and ordered to pay US$21.7 million in restitution. According to the "memorandum in aid of sentencing", the sentencing judge, U.S. District Judge Paul C. Huck, received over 260 pleas for leniency from various people, including "rabbis, military officers and even a professional hockey referee."

=== Guam grand jury investigation ===
In 2002, Abramoff was retained under a secret contract by the Superior Court of Guam to lobby against a bill proposing to put the Superior Court under the authority of the Guam Supreme Court. On November 18, 2002, a grand jury issued a subpoena, demanding that the administrator of the Guam Superior Court release all records relating to the contract. On November 19, 2002, U.S. Attorney Frederick A. Black, chief prosecutor for Guam and the instigator of the indictment, was unexpectedly demoted and removed from the office, which he had held since 1991. The federal grand jury investigation was quickly wound down, and no further action was taken on the matter. In 2005, Public Auditor Doris Flores Brooks initiated a new investigation of the Abramoff contract, which is still ongoing.

In 2006, California attorney and Marshall Islands lobbyist Howard Hills, and Tony Sanchez, a former administrator of the Guam Superior Court, were indicted for unlawful influence, conspiracy for unlawful influence, theft of property held in trust, and official misconduct for allegedly authorizing 36 payments of $9,000 through a preexisting contract between Hills and the Guam Superior Court. Each were written out to Hills, but were funneled to Abramoff. Trusting Sanchez as a court official at face value, Hills assumed it was a temporary circumstance and agreed to help facilitate transition for what he thought was a standard government contract between Abramoff and the court. Hills received no compensation. Before indictments or investigations were initiated, Hills halted his temporary contract with Abramoff and reported what he thought was potentially suspicious behavior to public officials when it occurred to him that something may be wrong. In 2007, superseding indictments were issued against Hills and Sanchez. In 2008, related indictments were handed down against Abramoff and Greenberg Traurig, Abramoff's firm at the time. The charges against both attorney Howard Hills and Greenberg Traurig were later dismissed.

=== Native tribes grand jury investigations ===
Abramoff and his partner, Michael Scanlon, a former aide to U.S. House Majority Leader Tom DeLay, conspired to bilk Native casino gambling interests out of an estimated $85 million in fees. The lobbyists also orchestrated lobbying against their own clients in order to force them to pay for lobbying services. These practices were the subject both of long-running criminal prosecution and hearings by the U.S. Senate Committee on Indian Affairs. On November 21, 2005, Scanlon pleaded guilty to conspiring to bribe a member of Congress and other public officials.

On January 3, 2006, Abramoff pleaded guilty to three felony counts for conspiracy, fraud, and tax evasion involving charges stemming principally from his lobbying activities in Washington, D.C., on behalf of Native American tribes. The four tribes with which Abramoff and his associates were involved were Michigan's Saginaw Chippewas, California's Agua Caliente, the Mississippi Choctaws, and the Louisiana Coushattas. As a result, Abramoff and other defendants must make restitution of at least $25 million that was defrauded from clients, primarily the Native American tribes. Further, Abramoff owes the Internal Revenue Service $1.7 million as a result of his guilty plea to the tax evasion charge. In the agreement, Abramoff admits to bribing public officials, including Ney. Also included: the hiring of congressional staffers and conspiring with them to lobby their former employers – including members of Congress – in violation of a one-year federal ban on such lobbying.

Later in 2006, Abramoff lobbyists Neil Volz and Tony Rudy pleaded guilty to conspiracy charges; in September 2006, Ney pleaded guilty to conspiracy and making false statements.

On September 4, 2008, a Washington, D.C. court found Abramoff guilty of trading expensive gifts, meals, and sports trips in exchange for political favors, and U.S. District Judge Ellen Segal Huvelle sentenced him to a four-year term in prison, to be served concurrently with his previous sentences. Abramoff cooperated in a bribery investigation involving lawmakers, their aides, and members of the Bush administration.

=== People convicted in Abramoff probe ===
Eventually 24 people were convicted of corruption or bribery.

- Michael Scanlon (R), former staff member to U.S. House Majority Leader Tom DeLay, pleaded guilty to committing bribery in the course of his work for Abramoff.
- Tony Rudy (R), former staff member to Majority Leader Tom DeLay, pleaded guilty to conspiracy.
- Adam Kidan, an Abramoff associate, was sentenced in Florida in March 2006, and served 27 months in prison followed by three years of probation.
- Todd Boulanger, an Abramoff deputy, pleaded guilty to lavishing congressional aides with meals, gifts, and tickets to sporting events, concerts, and the circus in exchange for help with legislation favorable to Abramoff's clients. He was sentenced to 30 days and fined.
- Roger Stillwell (R), a staff member in the Department of the Interior under George W. Bush, pleaded guilty and received two years suspended sentence for not reporting hundreds of dollars' worth of sports and concert tickets from Abramoff.
- Steven Griles (R), former U.S. Deputy Interior Secretary, the highest-ranking Bush administration official convicted in the scandal, pleaded guilty to obstruction of justice. He admitted lying to a U.S. Senate committee about his relationship with Abramoff, who repeatedly sought Griles' intervention at Interior on behalf of Indian tribal clients.
- David Safavian (R), a former White House official and the Bush administration's former top procurement official, was sentenced to 18 months in prison in October 2006 after he was found guilty of covering up his dealings with Abramoff.
- Bob Ney (R-OH), a U.S. Representative from Ohio, pleaded guilty September 2006, and was sentenced in January 2007 to 2½ years in prison, after acknowledging taking bribes from Abramoff. Ney was in the traveling party on an Abramoff-sponsored golf trip to Scotland at the heart of the case against Safavian.

1. Neil Volz (R), former chief of staff to Ney who left government to work for Abramoff, pleaded guilty in May 2006 to conspiring to corrupt Ney and others with trips and other aid
2. William Heaton (R), former chief of staff for Ney, pleaded guilty to a federal conspiracy charge involving a golf trip to Scotland, expensive meals, and tickets to sporting events between 2002 and 2004 as payoffs for helping Abramoff's clients.
3. Thomas Hart (R), former chief of staff for Ney, pleaded guilty to a federal conspiracy charge involving a golf trip to Scotland, expensive meals, and tickets to sporting events between 2002 and 2004 as payoffs for helping Abramoff's clients.

- Italia Federici (R), co-founder of the Council of Republicans for Environmental Advocacy, pleaded guilty to tax evasion and obstruction of a U.S. Senate investigation into Abramoff's relationship with officials at the Department of the Interior.
- Jared Carpenter (R), vice president of the Council of Republicans for Environmental Advocacy, pleaded guilty to income tax evasion and was sentenced to 45 days and four years of probation.
- Mark Zachares (R), former aide to U.S. Representative Don Young (R-AL), pleaded guilty to conspiracy. He acknowledged accepting tens of thousands of dollars' worth of gifts and a golf trip to Scotland from Abramoff's team in exchange for official acts on the lobbyist's behalf.
- Kevin A. Ring (R), former staff member to John Doolittle (R-CA), was convicted of five charges of corruption. He was sentenced to 20 months in prison in October 2011.
- James Hirni (R), U.S. Senate aide, acknowledged bribing Trevor L. Blackann (R), an aide to U.S. Senator Kit Bond (R), with meals, concert passes and tickets to the opening game of the 2003 World Series between the Florida Marlins and the New York Yankees at Yankee Stadium, pleaded guilty to using wire communications to defraud taxpayers of congressional aides' honest services.
- Trevor L. Blackann (R), former aide to U.S. Senator Kit Bond (R-MO) and then U.S. Representative Roy Blunt (R-MO), pleaded guilty to not reporting $4,100 in gifts from lobbyists in return for helping clients of Abramoff and his associates. Among the gifts were tickets to the World Series and concerts, plus meals and entertainment at a "gentleman's club."
- John Albaugh (R), former chief of staff to Ernest Istook (R-OK), pleaded guilty to accepting bribes associated with the Federal Highway Bill.
- Robert E. Coughlin (R), deputy chief of staff in the criminal division of the U.S. Justice Department, pleaded guilty to conflict of interest after accepting bribes from Abramoff
- Horace Cooper (R), a former U.S. Department of Labor official with the Bush administration and aide to U.S. Representative Dick Armey (R-TX), pleaded guilty to falsifying a document when he did not report receiving gifts from Abramoff.
- Ann Copland (R), former aide to U.S. Senator Thad Cochran (R-MS), pleaded guilty to taking more than $25,000 worth of concert and sporting event tickets in return for helping Abramoff.
- Roger Stillwell (R), a former U.S. Department of the Interior official, was sentenced to two years on probation in January 2007 after pleading guilty to a misdemeanor charge for not reporting hundreds of dollars worth of sports and concert tickets he received from Abramoff.
- Fraser Verrusio (R), a former U.S. Department of Transportation official, was found guilty of conspiracy and accepting bribes. Sentenced to 1 day in jail, 2 years' probation and a $1,000 fine.

== Incarceration ==
On November 15, 2005, Abramoff began serving a six-year sentence at Federal Correctional Institution, Cumberland, a minimum security prison in Allegany County, Maryland, where he was assigned inmate number 27593-112. The U.S. Justice Department requested that he serve his sentence there so he was easily accessible to agents in Washington, D.C., as the investigations related to his associates intensified.

While incarcerated, Abramoff worked as a clerk in the prison chaplain's office for 12 cents an hour, and taught courses in public speaking and screenwriting to fellow inmates. He also instituted a popular movie night. He served four of his six-year sentence at Federal Correctional Institution, Cumberland, and then was released to a half-way house.

On January 16, 2006, a profile of Abramoff by Karen Tumulty was featured on the cover of Time magazine above the front page heading, "The Man Who Bought Washington" with a subheading, which read: "Jack Abramoff took influence peddling to new heights--and depths. Now he's ready to tell all. A Time investigation of the lobbyist who's turning Washington inside out".

== Post-release activities ==
On June 8, 2010, Abramoff was released from federal prison and was transferred to a halfway house in Baltimore, Maryland where he served the remainder of his six-year sentence. In late June, he began working as an accountant at the kosher pizzeria Tov Pizza, working about 40 hours a week from 10:30 a.m. until 5:30 p.m., earning between $7.50 and $10.00 per hour. On December 3, 2010, he was released from the halfway house and ended his work for Tov Pizza.

After completing his sentence, Abramoff registered as a federal lobbyist and returned to lobbying in 2017, attempting to arrange meetings between then President-elect Donald Trump and foreign leaders.

On June 25, 2020, Abramoff and CEO Roland Marcus Andrade were charged in San Francisco federal court with fraud in connection with a $5 million cryptocurrency deal. Abramoff agreed to a negotiated plea of guilty. On July 14, 2020, Abramoff pleaded guilty to charges of conspiracy and violating the Lobbying Disclosure Act in relation to the AML BitCoin case under which he faced up to five years in prison for each count. This notably made Abramoff the first person to be convicted under the Lobbying Disclosure Act, which was amended as a result of his previous misconduct.

=== Criticism of lobbying industry ===
"I was involved deeply in a system of bribery – legalized bribery for the most part ... [that] still to a large part exists today." --Abramoff to Public Citizen, January 17, 2013

In November 2011, Abramoff's book, Capitol Punishment: The Hard Truth About Washington Corruption From America's Most Notorious Lobbyist, a 300-page memoir, was published. In its last chapter, titled "Path to Reform", Abramoff portrays himself as someone who supports genuine reform and lists a number of proposals to eliminate bribery of government officials such as barring members of Congress and their aides for life from becoming lobbyists.

Abramoff has become a critic of the lobbying industry, appearing on radio and television, "trying...to redeem and rebrand himself". He has a Facebook page, a game app, "Congressional Jack" and is developing a feature film about the lobbying milieu. He plans to charge for giving talks about corruption in Washington and has briefed FBI agents on the nature of corruption. He has joined United Republic, an anti-corruption nonprofit organization and in February 2012 became a lead blogger at United Republic's newly launched "Republic Report", which is described as "an anti-corruption blog focusing on how self-interested dollars are warping the public-interest responsibilities of America's democratic institutions" by HuffPost.

He has appeared as a guest on CNN, discussing lobbying and the Affordable Care Act, also known as Obamacare. In July 2012, Premier Networks announced it was launching "The Jack Abramoff Show" on XM Satellite Radio's "Talk Radio" channel, on which Abramoff would hold forth on political reform.

Following Abramoff's return to lobbying after being incarcerated, lawmakers passed the Justice Against Corruption on K Street (JACK) Act, which requires convicts such as Abramoff to disclose their criminal history when they re-register to lobby.

In June 2020, Abramoff entered guilty pleas on charges of criminal conspiracy and failing to adhere to the JACK Act.

== Personal life ==
Abramoff married to Pamela Clarke Abramoff (née Alexander), a co-manager and executive assistant at Capital Athletic Foundation since July 1986. The couple have five children. Pamela is a convert to Orthodox Judaism.

== See also ==
- List of federal political scandals in the United States
