= David Safavian =

American government official

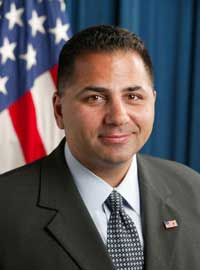

Political appointee at the General Services Administration
- President: George W. Bush

Administrator for Federal Procurement Policy
- President: George W. Bush

Personal details
- Born: Wyandotte, Michigan, USA
- Party: Republican Party
- Education: Gabriel Richard Catholic High School

David Safavian is an American former lawyer who worked as a congressional aide, lobbyist, and later as a political appointee in the George W. Bush administration. A Republican, he served as Chief of Staff of the United States General Services Administration (GSA). He is a figure in the Jack Abramoff lobbying scandal, having worked with the lobbyist on the Mississippi Band of Choctaw account. After serving with Abramoff as a lobbyist, in 1997 Safavian co-founded lobbying firm Janus-Merritt Strategies with Republican activist Grover Norquist.

In 2004, Safavian was serving as Administrator for Federal Procurement Policy, Office of Management and Budget, when he was arrested and charged with crimes in connection with the Abramoff corruption scandal. He was convicted on four of five charges on October 27, 2006, and sentenced to 18 months in prison. However, on June 17, 2008, the United States Court of Appeals for the District of Columbia Circuit unanimously reversed Safavian's convictions based on trial errors, and ordered a new trial. On December 19, 2008, at his retrial, Safavian was convicted again of 18 USC 1001. He was sentenced to a year in prison. Safavian lost his license to practice law as a result of the conviction but was readmitted to the DC Bar in 2017 upon petition. He was pardoned by President Donald Trump on February 18, 2020.

== Career ==
In 1997, Safavian and Grover Norquist founded a lobbying firm, the Merritt Group, which they renamed as Janus-Merritt Strategies (it is sometimes referred to as "Janus Merritt" or simply "Janus"). The firm promoted Republican ideology. "We represent clients who really do have an interest in a smaller federal government," Safavian told Legal Times in a 1997 interview. "We're all very ideologically driven, and have a bias in favor of free markets." He continued: "We're not letting people who offer us money change our principles."

The firm's clients included businesses such as BP America, the U.S. division of British Petroleum. They also had foreign clients, such as the Corporacion Venezolana de Cementos and Grupo Financiero Banorte. They represented the National Indian Gaming Commission and Indian tribes working on gaming, such as the Saginaw Chippewa, a client the firm shared with Jack Abramoff, and the Viejas band of Kumeyaay Indians.

In 1999, Safavian founded the Internet Consumer Choice Coalition, a non-profit organized to oppose a bill to make online gambling a federal crime; the bill was drafted by Republican Arizona US Senator Jon Kyl. Coalition members included the American Civil Liberties Union, the Association of Concerned Taxpayers, Citizens for a Sound Economy, the Competitive Enterprise Institute, the Interactive Services Association, the Small Business Survival Committee, and the United States Internet Council. Some coalition members—the Interactive Services Association, for one—were also independent clients of Safavian. Americans for Tax Reform, another member, was the activist group led by Norquist. An October 12, 2006, Senate Finance Committee report concluded that most of these organizations abused their tax-exempt status through participation in such lobbying through the Coalition.

Leading up to the 2000 election, Janus-Merritt Strategies, a lobbying firm of which Safavian was a partner, did coalition work with Arab and Muslim groups, in hope of generating political support for Republicans. Abdul Rahman al-Amoudi, a Muslim activist, was erroneously listed as a client of the firm in disclosure forms. (al-Amoudi was subsequently arrested for conspiring with the Libyan government.) Questioned on this in 2004 as part of his confirmation hearing in the Senate, Safavian pointed out that the listing of al-Amoudi was in error and was corrected in 2001, nearly three years prior. Janus-Merritt's client was actually Jamal al Barzinji, whose name had replaced al-Amoudi's on disclosure forms in 2001.

== Federal positions ==
Safavian first moved to Washington, DC in 1989. He interned for Michigan Congressman Robert W. Davis (R-MI). His first paid position was as a legislative correspondent with Congressman Bill Schuette (R-MI). Schuette lost the 1990 race for U.S. Senate against incumbent Carl Levin. After finishing law school three years later, Safavian accepted a position as law clerk to the Honorable Paul J. Komives, a United States Magistrate Judge in the Federal District Court for the Eastern District of Michigan.

Upon completion of his clerkship, Safavian went to work for the international law and lobbying firm, Preston, Gates Ellis & Rouvelas Mead as a tax lobbyist. He was supervised by Jack Abramoff. Safavian left the firm to open up Janus-Merritt Strategies in 1996. In 2000, he was hired as the chief of staff to Congressman Chris Cannon (R-UT). In 2002, Safavian joined the Bush Administration as a political appointee at the General Services Administration. On November 4, 2003, President George W. Bush announced Safavian's nomination as Administrator for Federal Procurement Policy, Office of Management and Budget, Executive Office of the President. He had the responsibility to set purchasing policy for the entire government.

== Prosecution and pardon ==
February 2020 pardon granted by Donald Trump

Safavian was indicted October 5, 2005. He was accused of making false statements and obstructing investigations into his dealings with Jack Abramoff while serving as chief of staff for the General Services Administration. His trial started May 25, 2006. He was convicted on four of five felony counts of lying and obstruction on June 20. Because Safavian's defense was unfairly limited, the court overturned all four convictions. Double jeopardy was applied to at least one charge and an additional specification. This left only three of the original five charges for which the prosecution could retry Safavian.

Safavian was retried and convicted of making false statements under 18 USC 1001. On October 16, 2009 he was sentenced to a year in prison for making false statements about his association with Jack Abramoff by U.S. District Judge Paul L. Friedman. Friedman deferred the prison reporting date to allow Safavian to be with his pregnant wife when she delivered their child.

Upon leaving prison, Safavian used his experience to lecture at graduate business schools on ethics and criminal justice. He gave lectures at Colgate, Georgetown, George Washington University, George Mason University, Johns Hopkins University, Loyola University Maryland, Villanova, and Virginia Tech. In 2014, Safavian was hired as an adjunct professor at the Georgetown University School of Continuing Studies, where he taught ethics in the graduate level real estate program for two years. He had his D.C. Bar License restored in 2017 after a number of his former students wrote to the DC Bar on his behalf.

On February 18, 2020 President Donald J. Trump granted Safavian a Presidential Pardon along with several others.

Safavian has become active in advocacy for improving the criminal justice system. His focus has been on increasing accountability for the system's results, improving the re-entry process, and fostering public safety. Washingtonian Magazine named him one of the most impactful advocates for Criminal Justice and Civil Liberties in Washington, DC, in both 2023 and 2024.

Safavian has a bachelor's degree in political science from Saint Louis University (1988), a Juris Doctor degree (magna cum laude) from Michigan State University College of Law(Detroit College of Law) (1993), a Masters of Law in Taxation from Georgetown University Law Center (1994), and a Masters of Business Administration from Loyola University Maryland (2014). He has had more than 60 op-eds published in newspapers around the country on topics ranging from crime policy to healthcare and politics.

== See also ==
- Jack Abramoff Indian lobbying scandal
- List of positions filled by presidential appointment with Senate confirmation
