= National Center for Public Policy Research =

American conservative think tank

The National Center for Public Policy Research
- Formation: 1982; 44 years ago
- Type: Think tank
- Headquarters: Washington, D.C., U.S.
- Revenue: $10.2 million (2024)
- Expenses: $10.1 million (2024)
- Staff: 12 (2024)
- Website: nationalcenter.org

The National Center for Public Policy Research (NCPPR), founded in 1982, is a self-described conservative think tank in the United States. Amy Ridenour was the founding CEO and chairman until her death in 2017. David A. Ridenour, her husband, serves as the group's chairman.

== Overview ==
NCPPR is a member of the advisory board of Project 2025, a collection of conservative and right-wing policy proposals from the Heritage Foundation to reshape the United States federal government and consolidate executive power should the Republican nominee win the 2024 presidential election.

As of 2026, the organization's board of directors includes Peter Schweizer, Edmund Haislmaier, Horace Cooper, Dennis Hollingsworth, Lisa Nelson, Craig Rucker, Susan Hirschmann, and David Ridenour.

In February 2014, at Apple Inc.'s annual shareholder meeting, a proposal by the NCPPR as a shareholder to force Apple to "disclose the costs of its sustainability programs" was rejected by 97% vote. The NCPPR representative argued that Apple's decision to have all of its power come from green sources would lower shareholders' profits. CEO Tim Cook "categorically rejected the worldview behind the NCPPR's advocacy. He said that there are many things Apple does because they are right and just, and that a return on investment (ROI) was not the primary consideration on such issues...When we work on making our devices accessible by the blind, I don't consider the bloody ROI... If you want me to do things only for ROI reasons, you should get out of this stock."
