= Ohio's 20th senatorial district =

American legislative district

Ohio's 20th State Senate district
Senator
Tim Schaffer; R–Lancaster
- Demographics: 84.7% White; 7.3% Black; 2.3% Hispanic; 2.9% Asian; 2.4% Native American; 0.1% Hawaiian/Pacific Islander
- Population (2020) • Voting age • Citizens of voting age: 359,774; 274,750; 266,831

Since the 2023 redistricting, Ohio's 20th senatorial district is made up of Lincoln, Fairfield Counties and the northern half of Perry County, it is made of the 68, 69 and 73 House Districts.

The current Ohio senator is Republican Tim Schaffer.

== Historically ==
Before the 2023 redistricting, Ohio's 20th senatorial district was based in east-central Ohio. It used to stretch into southeastern Ohio. It is made up of the counties of Fairfield, Hocking, Morgan, Muskingum and Guernsey, as well as portions of Pickaway and Athens counties. It encompasses Ohio House of Representatives districts 77, 78 and 97. It has a Cook PVI of R+16.

== List of senators ==
Senator	Party	Term	Notes
Tom V. Moorehead	Republican	January 3, 1963 – December 31, 1968	Moorehead lost re-election in 1968 to Robert Secrest.
Robert Secrest	Democrat	January 3, 1969 – December 31, 1976	Secrest did not seek re-election in 1976.
Sam Speck	Republican	January 3, 1977 – December 2, 1983	Speck resigned to take a position with FEMA in 1983.
Bob Ney	Republican	January 10, 1984 – January 3, 1995	Ney resigned in 1995 after winning election to the United States Congress.
James E. Carnes	Republican	January 3, 1995 – January 6, 2004	Carnes resigned to take a job at the Ohio Department of Natural Resources.
Joy Padgett	Republican	January 6, 2004 – December 31, 2008	Padgett did not seek re-election in 2008.
Jimmy Stewart	Republican	January 5, 2009 – June 30, 2011	Stewart resigned prior to the expiration of his term in 2012.
Troy Balderson	Republican	July 14, 2011 – January 2, 2019	Balderson resigned prior to the expiration of his term after winning a seat in the United States Congress.
Brian Hill	Republican	January 6, 2019 - April 2, 2019	Hill resigned to take a position in the private sector.
Tim Schaffer	Republican	May 3, 2019 – present	Incumbent
