= Senator Padgett =

Senator Padgett may refer to:

- Joy Padgett (born 1947), Ohio State Senate
- Lemuel P. Padgett (1855–1922), Tennessee State Senate
