= Paul B. Henry =

American politician

Paul Henry
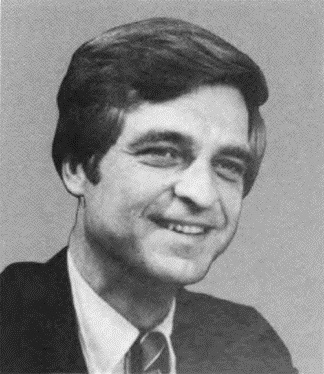

Member of the U.S. House of Representatives from Michigan
- In office January 3, 1985 – July 31, 1993
- Preceded by: Harold S. Sawyer
- Succeeded by: Vern Ehlers
- Constituency: 5th district (1985–1993); 3rd district (1993)

Member of the Michigan Senate from the 32nd district
- In office 1983-1985
- Preceded by: Stephen Monsma
- Succeeded by: Vern Ehlers

Member of the Michigan House of Representatives from the 91st district
- In office 1979-1982
- Preceded by: Peter Kok
- Succeeded by: Walter J. DeLange

Personal details
- Born: July 9, 1942 Chicago, Illinois, U.S.
- Died: July 31, 1993 (aged 51) Grand Rapids, Michigan, U.S.
- Party: Republican
- Education: Wheaton College, Duke University

Paul Brentwood Henry (July 9, 1942 – July 31, 1993) was an American professor of political science and politician from Michigan. He was elected to five terms and served in the U.S. House of Representatives from 1985 until his death from brain cancer in Grand Rapids, Michigan in 1993.

== Early life and career ==
Henry was born in Chicago and graduated from Pasadena High School, Pasadena, California, in 1959. His father Carl F. H. Henry, noted theologian, was one of the founders of Fuller Theological Seminary and the founding editor of Christianity Today. His mother, author Helga Bender Henry, was born in Cameroon, West Africa, the daughter of German born American missionaries.

Henry received a B.A. from Wheaton College, Wheaton, Illinois in 1963, and then was a Peace Corps volunteer in Liberia and Ethiopia from 1963 to 1965. Upon returning to the United States, he attended graduate school at Duke University, Durham, North Carolina, earning a M.A. in 1968, and a PhD in 1970.

Henry was professor of political science at Calvin College in Grand Rapids, Michigan from 1970 to 1978.

== Political career ==
From 1965 to 1970, while he was a graduate student at Duke, Henry served two stints as a staffer for Congressman John B. Anderson (R-IL). During 1968 and 1969, while Anderson was the third-ranking Republican in Congress, Henry's job involved promoting good communication within the party caucus.

In 1974, after Henry had been at Calvin College for several years, Democrat Richard Vander Veen won the congressional seat centered on Grand Rapids, long held by Gerald Ford, in the wake of the Watergate scandal. Henry was subsequently asked to provide new direction to the Kent County Republican Party as its new chairman. The following year, Henry was appointed by Governor William Milliken to the Michigan State Board of Education, on which he served from 1975 to 1978.

Henry ran for an open seat in the Michigan State House of Representatives in 1978 and served in that body from 1979 to 1982, where he represented the 91st district, then moving up to serve one term in the Michigan State Senate, where he represented the 32nd district.

=== Tenure in Congress ===
In 1984, Henry was elected as a Republican from Michigan's 5th District to the U.S. House of Representatives, winning the open seat being vacated by Republican Congressman Harold S. Sawyer. The Grand Rapids-based district had historically been a Republican stronghold, but had fallen into Democratic hands after longtime congressman and House Minority Leader Gerald Ford gave it up to become Vice President of the United States (he ascended to the presidency a few months later). Sawyer had defeated Ford's predecessor, Richard Vander Veen in 1976, but had faced some of the closest races the district had seen in memory.

In 1984, however, the district reverted to form, and Henry won with 62 percent of the vote. He was re-elected three more times without serious difficulty. After redistricting due to the United States 1990 census, his district was renumbered as the 3rd district. Henry served in Congress for 8½ years, from January 3, 1985 until his death.

In the House of Representatives, Henry served on the committees on Education and Labor, Science, Space and Technology, and the Select Committee on Aging.

He was known for opposing federal funding of offensive artwork, but he did not join other Republicans who sought the complete defunding of federal support for the arts.

== Death ==
External videos
- Funeral service for Rep. Henry, August 3, 1993, C-SPAN

In October 1992, two weeks before election day, Henry was diagnosed with a brain tumor. He underwent surgery a few days before he was re-elected to his fifth term in Congress. He regained strength briefly and was able to attend his swearing into the 103rd Congress on January 3, 1993, but then began to decline again.

Paul Henry died in Grand Rapids on July 31, 1993, at the age of 51, after having brain cancer for nine months. He was interred at Woodlawn Cemetery in Grand Rapids.

== Legacy ==
Henry was succeeded in Congress by Vern Ehlers, a fellow faculty member at Calvin College who had also succeeded Henry in the state senate.

Henry Hall at Grand Valley State University in Grand Rapids is named after Paul B. Henry. It houses the Biology department, three lecture halls, and several computer labs. The Paul B. Henry Congressional Internship supports a student from GVSU to work in the Washington, D.C. office of a member of the Michigan delegation with a scholarship from the Paul B. Henry Foundation.

M-6, a highway on the south side of Grand Rapids connecting Interstate 96 and Interstate 196, was named the Paul B. Henry Freeway. Construction on the highway began in 1997 and was completed in 2004, four years ahead of schedule.

Calvin College established The Paul B. Henry Institute for the Study of Christianity and Politics in 1997 to continue the work of integrating Christian faith and politics advanced by its namesake.

A multi use trail from Kentwood, through Caledonia, Middleville, and Hastings on through to Vermontville was named the Paul Henry–Thornapple Rail Trail.

== See also ==
- List of members of the United States Congress who died in office (1950–1999)

U.S. House of Representatives
Preceded by Harold S. Sawyer	Member of the U.S. House of Representatives from Michigan's 5th congressional district 1985–1993	Succeeded by James Barcia
Preceded by Howard Wolpe	Member of the U.S. House of Representatives from Michigan's 3rd congressional district 1993	Succeeded by Vern Ehlers
