= 2018 Ohio State Auditor election =

- November 6, 2018
- Turnout: 53.79%
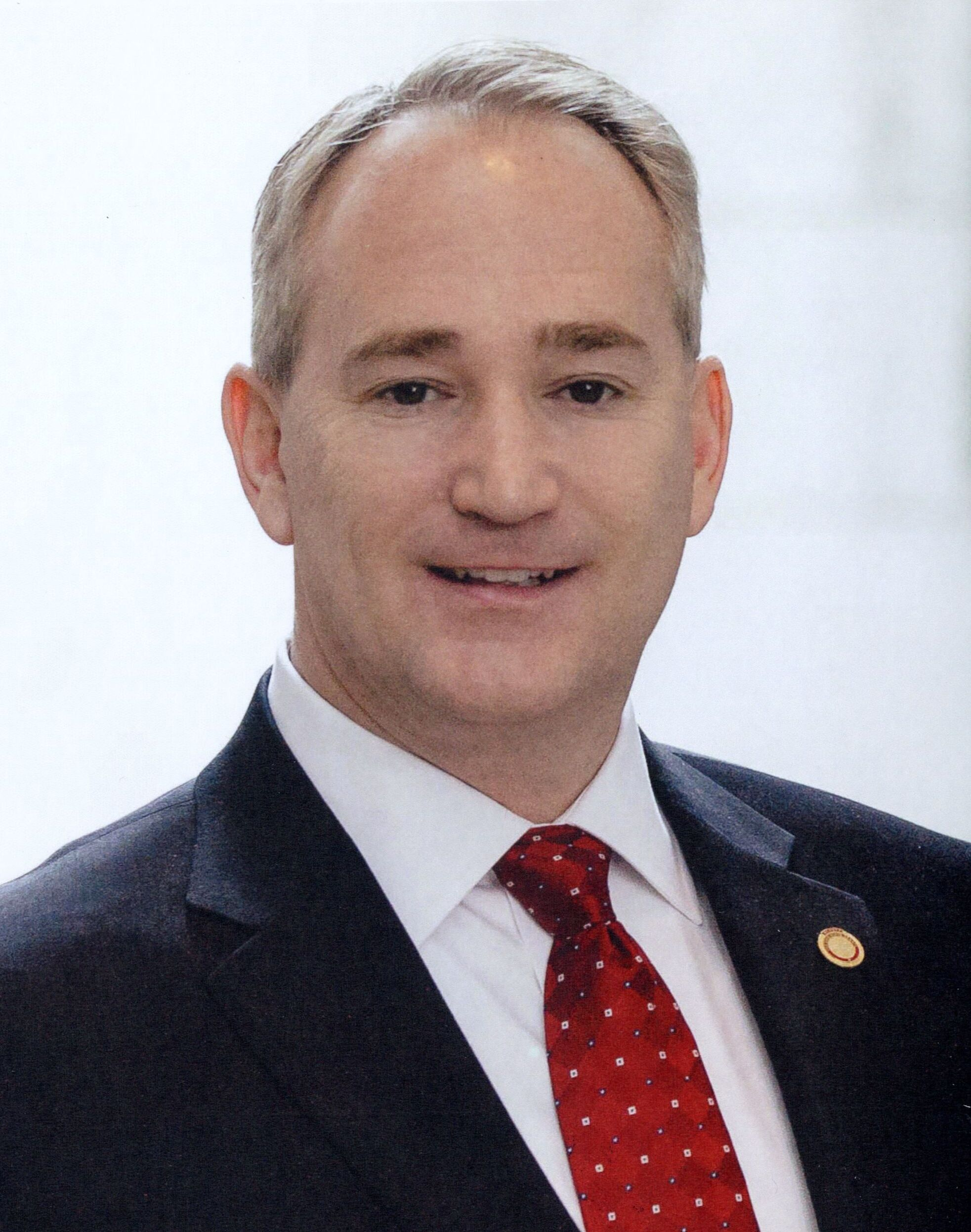

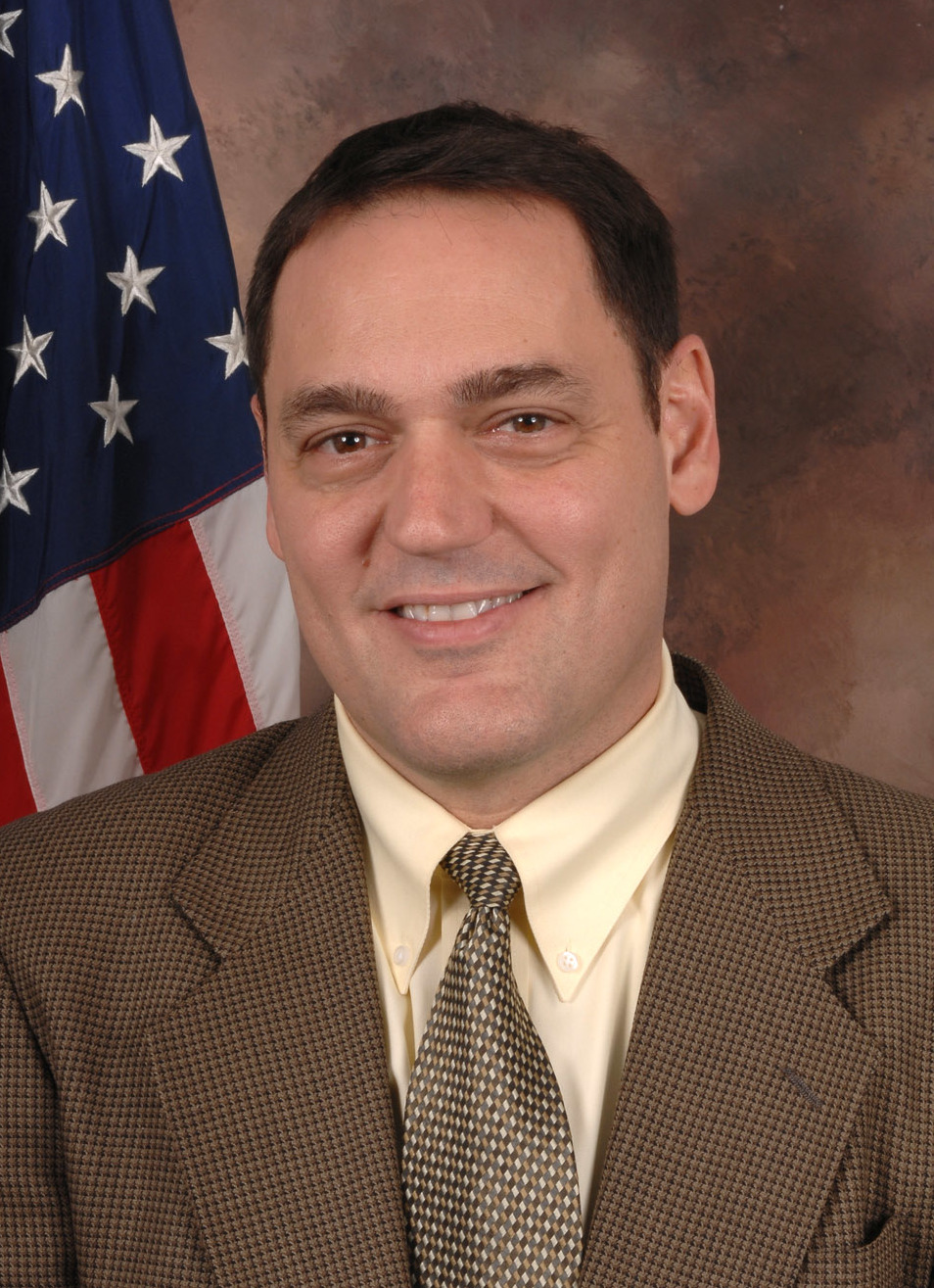
| Nominee | Keith Faber | Zack Space |
| Party | Republican | Democratic |
| Popular vote | 2,156,663 | 2,008,295 |
| Percentage | 49.68% | 46.26% |
- Faber: 40–50% 50–60% 60–70% 70–80% 80–90% >90% Space: 40–50% 50–60% 60–70% 70–80% 80–90% >90% Tie: 40–50% No data
Auditor before election
Dave Yost
Republican
Elected Auditor
Keith Faber
Republican

The 2018 Ohio State Auditor election was held on November 6, 2018, to elect the Ohio State Auditor, concurrently with an election to the U.S. Senate, governor, U.S. House of Representatives, and other state and local elections. Incumbent Republican auditor Dave Yost was term-limited and could not seek re-election to a third consecutive term. Primary elections were held on May 8, 2018, though both the Republican and Democratic nominees ran uncontested. A debate was held on October 19, 2018.

Republican state representative and former state senator Keith Faber defeated former Democratic U.S. representative Zack Space in the general election. Both major party candidates were accused of serious legal issues and mismanagement of state funds during the campaign, with Faber being attacked due to the federal investigation of Cliff Rosenberger and the ECOT scandal, and Space due to late tax payments and a law license suspension.

== Republican primary ==
=== Candidates ===
==== Nominee ====
- Keith Faber, President of the Ohio Senate (2013-2016), state senator from the 12th district (2007-2016), and state representative from the 84th district (2001-2007, 2017-2019)

==== Declined ====
- Cliff Rosenberger, Speaker of the Ohio House of Representatives

=== Results ===
Republican primary results
| Party | Candidate | Votes | % |
|---|---|---|---|
| Republican | Keith Faber | 611,729 | 100.0 |
| Total votes | | 611,729 | 100.0 |

== Democratic primary ==
=== Candidates ===
==== Nominee ====
- Zack Space, member of the United States House of Representatives from Ohio's 18th congressional district (2007-2011)

==== Failed to qualify ====
- Kelli Prather, occupational therapist, candidate for U.S. Senate in 2016, candidate for Cincinnati City Council in 2017

=== Results ===
Democratic primary results
| Party | Candidate | Votes | % |
|---|---|---|---|
| Democratic | Zack Space | 508,131 | 100.0 |
| Total votes | | 508,131 | 100.0 |

== Libertarian primary ==
=== Candidates ===
==== Nominee ====
- Robert Coogan, accountant and candidate for state representative in 2012

== General election ==
=== Endorsements ===
Keith Faber (R)

Organizations

- Ohio Society of CPAs
Zack Space (D)

U.S. executive branch officials

- Barack Obama, 44th president of the United States

U.S. representatives

- Tim Ryan, U.S. representative (OH-13)
- Betty Sutton, former U.S. representative (OH-13)

State senators

- Joe Schiavoni, state senator

Newspapers

- Plain Dealer

=== Polling ===
| Poll source | Date(s) administered | Sample size | Margin of error | Keith Faber (R) | Zack Space (D) | Undecided |
|---|---|---|---|---|---|---|
| Baldwin Wallace University | October 19–27, 2018 | 1,051 | ± 3.8% | 32% | 40% | 22% |
| Change Research (D-Innovation Ohio) | August 31 – September 4, 2018 | 822 | ± 3.0% | 40% | 37% | 23% |
| Fallon Research | May 21–25, 2018 | 800 | ± 3.5% | 32% | 35% | 33% |

=== Results ===
2018 Ohio State Auditor election
| Party | Candidate | Votes | % |
|---|---|---|---|
| Republican | Keith Faber | 2,156,663 | 49.68% |
| Democratic | Zack Space | 2,008,925 | 46.26% |
| Libertarian | Robert Coogan | 175,962 | 4.05% |
| Total votes | | 4,341,550 | 100.0% |
| Republican hold | | | |

==== By county ====
2018 Ohio State Auditor election (by county)
| County | Keith Faber Republican | | Zack Space Democratic | | Robert Coogan Libertarian | | Margin | | Total votes cast |
| County | # | % | # | % | # | % | # | % | Total votes cast |
|---|---|---|---|---|---|---|---|---|---|
| Adams | 6,223 | 73.30% | 1,967 | 23.17% | 300 | 3.53% | 4,256 | 50.13% | 8,490 |
| Allen | 24,690 | 68.54% | 10,222 | 28.38% | 1,111 | 3.08% | 14,468 | 40.16% | 36,023 |
| Ashland | 12,465 | 68.18% | 5,010 | 27.40% | 807 | 4.42% | 7,455 | 40.78% | 18,282 |
| Ashtabula | 16,652 | 52.29% | 13,596 | 42.70% | 1,595 | 5.01% | 3,056 | 9.59% | 31,843 |
| Athens | 7,224 | 32.32% | 14,261 | 63.80% | 868 | 3.88% | -7,037 | -31.48% | 22,353 |
| Auglaize | 15,388 | 80.13% | 3,241 | 16.88% | 575 | 2.99% | 12,147 | 63.25% | 18,629 |
| Belmont | 13,463 | 55.07% | 10,174 | 41.62% | 810 | 3.31% | 3,289 | 13.45% | 24,447 |
| Brown | 10,509 | 71.47% | 3,598 | 24.47% | 598 | 4.06% | 6,911 | 47.00% | 14,705 |
| Butler | 82,476 | 61.35% | 45,879 | 34.13% | 6,084 | 4.52% | 36,597 | 27.22% | 134,439 |
| Carroll | 6,235 | 61.23% | 3,552 | 34.88% | 396 | 3.89% | 2,683 | 26.35% | 10,183 |
| Champaign | 10,087 | 68.67% | 3,988 | 27.15% | 614 | 4.18% | 6,099 | 41.52% | 14,689 |
| Clark | 27,067 | 56.90% | 18,587 | 39.07% | 1,918 | 4.03% | 8,480 | 17.83% | 47,572 |
| Clermont | 53,002 | 67.10% | 22,051 | 27.92% | 3,931 | 4.98% | 30,951 | 39.18% | 78,984 |
| Clinton | 10,767 | 72.52% | 3,397 | 22.88% | 683 | 4.60% | 7,370 | 49.64% | 14,847 |
| Columbiana | 22,695 | 64.20% | 11,220 | 31.74% | 1,434 | 4.06% | 11,475 | 32.46% | 35,349 |
| Coshocton | 7,087 | 59.97% | 4,338 | 36.71% | 393 | 3.32% | 2,749 | 23.26% | 11,818 |
| Crawford | 9,642 | 67.32% | 4,148 | 28.96% | 533 | 3.72% | 5,494 | 38.36% | 14,323 |
| Cuyahoga | 137,796 | 29.34% | 313,004 | 66.65% | 18,788 | 4.01% | -175,208 | -37.31% | 469,588 |
| Darke | 15,755 | 80.44% | 3,309 | 16.89% | 522 | 2.67% | 12,446 | 63.55% | 19,586 |
| Defiance | 8,582 | 63.63% | 4,333 | 32.12% | 573 | 4.25% | 4,249 | 31.51% | 13,488 |
| Delaware | 51,180 | 55.15% | 38,485 | 41.46% | 3,142 | 3.39% | 12,695 | 13.69% | 92,807 |
| Erie | 14,935 | 50.35% | 13,518 | 45.57% | 1,211 | 4.08% | 1,417 | 4.78% | 29,664 |
| Fairfield | 33,751 | 57.52% | 22,950 | 39.11% | 1,979 | 3.37% | 10,801 | 18.41% | 58,680 |
| Fayette | 5,855 | 69.36% | 2,337 | 27.69% | 249 | 2.95% | 3,518 | 41.67% | 8,441 |
| Franklin | 157,387 | 33.07% | 301,420 | 63.34% | 17,029 | 3.59% | -144,033 | -30.27% | 475,836 |
| Fulton | 10,433 | 65.31% | 4,855 | 30.39% | 686 | 4.30% | 5,578 | 34.92% | 15,974 |
| Gallia | 6,646 | 70.03% | 2,562 | 27.00% | 282 | 2.97% | 4,084 | 43.03% | 9,490 |
| Geauga | 24,317 | 58.82% | 15,250 | 36.89% | 1,774 | 4.29% | 9,067 | 21.93% | 41,341 |
| Greene | 40,446 | 59.78% | 23,899 | 35.32% | 3,310 | 4.90% | 16,547 | 24.46% | 67,655 |
| Guernsey | 7,493 | 60.01% | 4,579 | 36.67% | 414 | 3.32% | 2,914 | 23.34% | 12,486 |
| Hamilton | 143,475 | 43.15% | 172,439 | 51.86% | 16,594 | 4.99% | -28,964 | -8.71% | 332,508 |
| Hancock | 18,811 | 67.70% | 7,781 | 28.00% | 1,195 | 4.30% | 11,030 | 39.70% | 27,787 |
| Hardin | 6,343 | 68.09% | 2,626 | 28.19% | 347 | 3.72% | 3,717 | 39.90% | 9,316 |
| Harrison | 3,248 | 56.07% | 2,363 | 40.79% | 182 | 3.14% | 885 | 15.28% | 5,793 |
| Henry | 7,164 | 68.60% | 2,859 | 27.38% | 420 | 4.02% | 4,305 | 41.22% | 10,443 |
| Highland | 9,836 | 73.68% | 3,016 | 22.59% | 498 | 3.73% | 6,820 | 51.09% | 13,350 |
| Hocking | 5,494 | 55.93% | 3,955 | 40.67% | 333 | 3.40% | 1,499 | 15.26% | 9,822 |
| Holmes | 6,660 | 76.55% | 1,792 | 20.60% | 248 | 2.85% | 4,868 | 55.95% | 8,700 |
| Huron | 11,262 | 61.20% | 6,246 | 33.95% | 892 | 4.85% | 5,016 | 27.25% | 18,400 |
| Jackson | 6,357 | 63.44% | 3,391 | 33.84% | 272 | 2.72% | 2,966 | 29.60% | 10,020 |
| Jefferson | 13,487 | 55.83% | 9,663 | 40.00% | 1,008 | 4.17% | 3,824 | 15.83% | 24,158 |
| Knox | 14,324 | 62.89% | 7,724 | 33.91% | 727 | 3.20% | 6,600 | 28.98% | 22,775 |
| Lake | 47,938 | 51.84% | 40,482 | 43.77% | 4,057 | 4.39% | 7,456 | 8.07% | 92,477 |
| Lawrence | 13,021 | 64.88% | 6,340 | 31.59% | 709 | 3.53% | 6,681 | 33.29% | 20,070 |
| Licking | 39,198 | 57.90% | 26,242 | 38.76% | 2,260 | 3.34% | 12,956 | 19.14% | 67,700 |
| Logan | 12,024 | 73.26% | 3,787 | 23.07% | 601 | 3.67% | 8,237 | 50.19% | 16,412 |
| Lorain | 49,411 | 44.51% | 56,779 | 51.14% | 4,831 | 4.35% | -7,368 | -6.63% | 106,190 |
| Lucas | 56,099 | 38.90% | 85,124 | 57.50% | 6,813 | 3.60% | -29,025 | -18.60% | 148,036 |
| Madison | 8,869 | 65.00% | 4,270 | 31.29% | 506 | 3.71% | 4,599 | 33.71% | 13,645 |
| Mahoning | 37,478 | 43.02% | 46,231 | 53.07% | 3,395 | 3.91% | -8,753 | -10.05% | 87,104 |
| Marion | 12,201 | 60.39% | 7,015 | 34.72% | 989 | 4.89% | 5,186 | 25.67% | 20,205 |
| Medina | 41,864 | 57.18% | 28,319 | 38.68% | 3,026 | 4.14% | 13,545 | 18.50% | 73,209 |
| Meigs | 5,186 | 67.68% | 2,200 | 28.71% | 277 | 3.61% | 2,986 | 38.97% | 7,763 |
| Mercer | 14,100 | 82.09% | 2,633 | 15.33% | 443 | 2.58% | 11,467 | 66.76% | 17,176 |
| Miami | 28,789 | 70.10% | 10,591 | 25.79% | 1,687 | 4.11% | 18,198 | 44.31% | 41,067 |
| Monroe | 2,875 | 56.09% | 2,066 | 40.30% | 185 | 3.61% | 809 | 15.79% | 5,126 |
| Montgomery | 96,800 | 47.91% | 96,710 | 47.86% | 8,533 | 4.23% | 90 | 0.05% | 202,043 |
| Morgan | 2,958 | 59.03% | 1,928 | 38.47% | 125 | 2.50% | 1,030 | 20.56% | 5,011 |
| Morrow | 8,852 | 68.00% | 3,670 | 28.20% | 494 | 3.80% | 5,182 | 39.80% | 13,016 |
| Muskingum | 16,878 | 58.45% | 11,139 | 38.57% | 861 | 2.98% | 5,739 | 19.88% | 28,878 |
| Noble | 3,036 | 66.11% | 1,418 | 30.88% | 138 | 3.01% | 1,618 | 35.23% | 4,592 |
| Ottawa | 9,946 | 55.37% | 7,135 | 39.72% | 880 | 4.91% | 2,811 | 15.65% | 17,961 |
| Paulding | 4,682 | 68.68% | 1,872 | 27.46% | 263 | 3.86% | 2,810 | 41.22% | 6,817 |
| Perry | 6,986 | 61.10% | 4,062 | 35.52% | 386 | 3.38% | 2,924 | 25.58% | 11,434 |
| Pickaway | 12,599 | 64.66% | 6,232 | 31.98% | 653 | 3.36% | 6,367 | 32.68% | 19,484 |
| Pike | 5,004 | 57.84% | 3,399 | 39.28% | 249 | 2.88% | 1,605 | 18.56% | 8,652 |
| Portage | 28,389 | 48.55% | 27,146 | 46.46% | 2,896 | 4.99% | 1,243 | 2.09% | 58,431 |
| Preble | 11,704 | 74.15% | 3,393 | 21.49% | 688 | 4.36% | 8,311 | 52.66% | 15,785 |
| Putnam | 11,921 | 81.22% | 2,367 | 16.13% | 388 | 2.65% | 9,554 | 65.09% | 14,676 |
| Richland | 27,545 | 63.35% | 14,492 | 33.33% | 1,443 | 3.32% | 13,053 | 30.02% | 43,480 |
| Ross | 12,838 | 55.47% | 9,604 | 41.50% | 701 | 3.03% | 3,234 | 13.97% | 23,143 |
| Sandusky | 12,364 | 57.43% | 8,175 | 37.97% | 990 | 4.60% | 4,189 | 19.46% | 21,529 |
| Scioto | 13,949 | 60.04% | 8,484 | 36.52% | 800 | 3.44% | 5,465 | 23.52% | 23,233 |
| Seneca | 11,408 | 61.80% | 6,266 | 33.94% | 785 | 4.26% | 5,142 | 27.86% | 18,459 |
| Shelby | 14,661 | 78.84% | 3,320 | 17.85% | 614 | 3.31% | 11,341 | 60.99% | 18,595 |
| Stark | 72,942 | 53.10% | 59,082 | 43.01% | 5,349 | 3.89% | 13,860 | 10.09% | 137,373 |
| Summit | 85,626 | 41.13% | 113,817 | 54.67% | 8,727 | 4.20% | -28,191 | -13.54% | 208,170 |
| Trumbull | 33,259 | 45.68% | 36,760 | 50.48% | 2,795 | 3.84% | -3,501 | -4.80% | 72,814 |
| Tuscarawas | 16,724 | 51.81% | 14,616 | 45.28% | 940 | 2.91% | 2,108 | 6.53% | 32,280 |
| Union | 15,053 | 64.21% | 7,394 | 31.54% | 997 | 4.25% | 7,659 | 32.67% | 23,444 |
| Van Wert | 8,163 | 76.82% | 2,134 | 20.08% | 329 | 3.10% | 6,029 | 56.74% | 10,626 |
| Vinton | 2,498 | 61.12% | 1,465 | 35.84% | 124 | 3.04% | 1,033 | 25.28% | 4,087 |
| Warren | 65,703 | 66.59% | 28,962 | 29.35% | 4,002 | 4.06% | 36,741 | 37.24% | 98,667 |
| Washington | 14,468 | 63.21% | 7,554 | 33.00% | 866 | 3.79% | 6,914 | 30.21% | 22,888 |
| Wayne | 24,775 | 63.17% | 12,961 | 33.05% | 1,481 | 3.78% | 11,814 | 30.12% | 39,217 |
| Williams | 8,939 | 68.48% | 3,508 | 26.87% | 606 | 4.65% | 5,431 | 41.61% | 13,053 |
| Wood | 24,805 | 50.96% | 21,452 | 44.07% | 2,421 | 4.97% | 3,353 | 6.89% | 48,678 |
| Wyandot | 5,516 | 69.26% | 2,114 | 26.54% | 334 | 4.20% | 3,402 | 42.72% | 7,964 |
| Totals | 2,156,663 | 49.68% | 2,008,925 | 45.26% | 175,962 | 4.05% | 147,738 | 3.42% | 4,341,550 |

Counties that flipped from Democratic to Republican

- Monroe (largest city: Woodsfield)

Counties that flipped from Republican to Democratic

- Franklin (largest city: Columbus)
- Hamilton (largest city: Cincinnati)
- Lorain (largest city: Lorain)
- Summit (largest city: Akron)

==== By congressional district ====
Faber won 12 of 16 congressional districts.

| District | Faber | Space | Representative |
|---|---|---|---|
| 1st | 52% | 44% | Steve Chabot |
| 2nd | 54% | 41% | Brad Wenstrup |
| 3rd | 26% | 70% | Joyce Beatty |
| 4th | 63% | 33% | Jim Jordan |
| 5th | 59% | 36% | Bob Latta |
| 6th | 61% | 35% | Bill Johnson |
| 7th | 58% | 39% | Bob Gibbs |
| 8th | 65% | 31% | Warren Davidson |
| 9th | 35% | 61% | Marcy Kaptur |
| 10th | 51% | 44% | Mike Turner |
| 11th | 17% | 79% | Marcia Fudge |
| 12th | 51% | 46% | Troy Balderson |
| 13th | 40% | 56% | Tim Ryan |
| 14th | 51% | 45% | David Joyce |
| 15th | 51% | 45% | Steve Stivers |
| 16th | 53% | 43% | Anthony Gonzalez |

== See also ==
- 2018 Ohio elections
- 2018 United States elections
