= Nigel Winfield =

American businessman and convicted felon

Nigel Winfield is an American businessman and convicted felon who once ran a company in Cyprus called FN Aviation. He did some dealings with Bob Ney, a Republican congressman from Ohio who later pleaded guilty to bribery charges. Specifically, he paid for a February 2003 trip to London for Ney and an aide, and in return Ney personally lobbied then-Secretary of State Colin Powell to ease U.S. sanctions against Iran.

Winfield pleaded guilty to charges of tax evasion in 1988; he pleaded guilty to hiding $11.3 million in income from the IRS.
