= Thomas W. Johnson =

American politician (born 1949)

Member of the Ohio House of Representatives from the 96th district
- In office January 3, 1977-January 5, 1999
- Preceded by: Sam Speck
- Succeeded by: Nancy P. Hollister

Personal details
- Born: April 14, 1949 (age 77) Zanesville, Ohio, U.S.
- Party: Republican
- Spouse: Joyce Ferguson Johnson
- Children: 2 daughters

Thomas W. Johnson (born April 14, 1949) is an American politician who served as a Republican member of the Ohio House of Representatives from 1977 to 1999. Johnson began his career in the House in 1977 and served 22 years, representing Southeast Ohio. He served as House Finance and Appropriations Chair. In 1999, he resigned to serve as Director of the Office of Budget and Management in the cabinet of Governor Bob Taft. In 2006, he was appointed executive-in-residence of the John Glenn School Public Affairs at The Ohio State University and served as assistant vice-president of financial services before leaving the University.

Johnson was appointed to the Public Utilities Commission of Ohio (PUCO) by Governor John Kasich in April 2014. Johnson served as PUCO chairman for the first year of his term, served as a commissioner until his PUCO term ended in April 2019.
