= Jimmy Stewart (politician) =

American politician (born 1970)

Member of the Ohio Senate from the 20th district
- In office January 5, 2009 – June 30, 2011
- Preceded by: Joy Padgett
- Succeeded by: Troy Balderson

Member of the Ohio House of Representatives from the 92nd district
- In office January 3, 2003 – December 31, 2008
- Preceded by: New District
- Succeeded by: Debbie Phillips

Personal details
- Born: January 24, 1970 (age 56) Huntington, West Virginia, U.S.
- Party: Republican
- Education: Marshall University, Xavier University
- Profession: Legislator

Jimmy Stewart (born January 24, 1970) is a Republican politician who served in the Ohio General Assembly. He served as a member of the Ohio House of Representatives from 2003 to 2008, and in the Ohio Senate from 2009 to 2011.

== Biography ==
After graduation from Marshall University and Xavier University, Stewart was a salesman for Caterpillar before winning election to Athens First Ward City Council, defeating incumbent Linda Hiller in the 1997 election. Later Stewart would be elected to City of Athens Auditor.

With incumbent Kerry Metzger unable to run again due to term limits, Stewart sought to replace him. Unopposed in the 2002 primary election, Stewart faced James Pancake in the general election, and won by 4,000 votes. Early in his first term, Governor Bob Taft named Stewart to the Commission on Higher Education.

Sighting Stewart as vulnerable in 2004, House Democrats fielded former Athens City Councilman Pat Lang to run against him. However, Stewart was easily reelected, winning by 9,000 votes.

When Joy Padgett became a candidate for Congress in 2006, Stewart was mentioned as a potential appointment candidate if she had won the seat. However, Padgett lost to Zack Space.

In his battle for a third term, Stewart faced his strongest opposition yet. Stewart had the support of Trimble Township community activist Buddy Hooper. Challenged by Democrat Debbie Phillips, final tallies came down to under 1,000 votes, guaranteeing an automatic recount. Stewart won this time by only 842 votes.

In September 2007, Joy Padgett announced that she would not seek another term in the Senate. Shortly after, Senate Republicans stated that they would support Stewart to replace her. With the Senate seat being one targeted in the past by Democrats, they took the open seat as an opportunity, and fielded Morgan County Commissioner Rick Shriver to run against Stewart and Green Party candidate Tim Kettler. The race proved to be colorful, with Shriver being caught up in false stories perpetuated by Stewart's campaign, and with Stewart touting the reliability of his Geo Prizm. Stewart beat Shriver by 12,000 votes. Stewart outspent Shriver ten to one.

For the 129th General Assembly, Stewart served as Senate majority floor leader, the third highest position of the Senate.

In late May 2011, Stewart announced that he planned to resign his seat in the 20th Senate District at the end of the fiscal year, when he will go to serve as president of the Ohio Gas Association. While Stewart says that there were no ulterior motives, many believe Stewart's unpopular votes on collective bargaining legislation lead to the decision to resign. Stewart continued as majority floor leader, the number three leadership post, until he left office. Stewart resigned from the Senate effective June 30, 2011, over eight years after initially coming to the Ohio General Assembly.

Lost 2020 Meigs County Auditors Race.
