= Harold S. Sawyer =

American politician (1920–2003)

Harold Sawyer
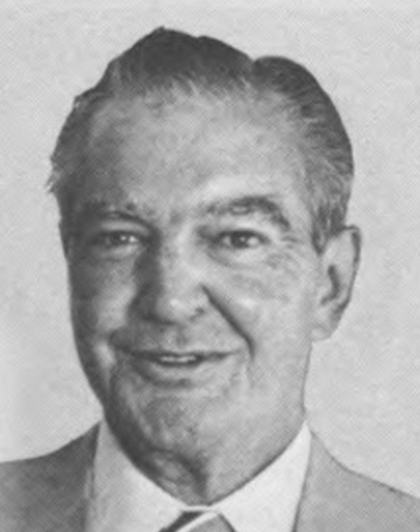

Member of the U.S. House of Representatives from Michigan's 5th district
- In office January 3, 1977 – January 3, 1985
- Preceded by: Richard Vander Veen
- Succeeded by: Paul Henry

Personal details
- Born: March 21, 1920 San Francisco, California, U.S.
- Died: April 2, 2003 (aged 83) Algoma Township, Michigan, U.S.
- Party: Republican
- Education: Marin Junior College; University of California, Berkeley (BA); University of California, Hastings (JD)
- Occupation: Attorney

Military service
- Branch/service: United States Navy
- Battles/wars: World War II

Harold Samuel Sawyer (March 21, 1920 – April 2, 2003) was an American attorney and politician from the U.S. state of Michigan. Born and raised in the San Francisco Bay Area, Sawyer represented Michigan's 5th congressional district in the United States House of Representatives from 1977 to 1985.

== Early life and education ==
Sawyer was born in San Francisco, California. He attended public schools of the San Francisco Bay area before graduating from Marin Junior College (now the College of Marin), Kentfield, California and from the University of California, Berkeley in 1940. He earned a J.D. from the University of California, Hastings College of the Law in 1943.

== Career ==
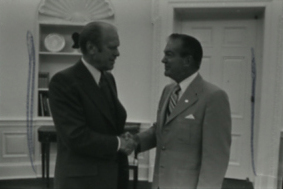
Sawyer greeting President Gerald Ford in 1976

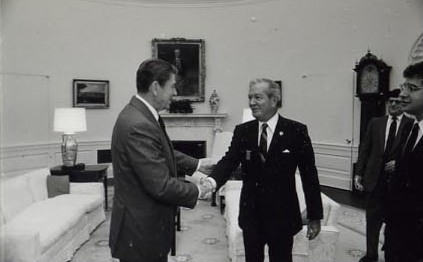
Sawyer greeting President Ronald Reagan in 1982

He served in the United States Navy during World War II, after which he settled in Grand Rapids, Michigan and established a successful private law practice.

From 1968 to 1976, Sawyer was a member of the Michigan Law Revision Commission. From 1975 to 1976, he was prosecuting attorney for Kent County. In 1976, Sawyer defeated incumbent Democrat Richard Vander Veen to reclaim Michigan's 5th congressional district for the Republicans. The seat had been held by Gerald R. Ford until he was appointed to become Vice President of the United States; it had been in Republican hands without interruption from 1913 until Vander Veen's victory. Sawyer benefited from the presence of Ford atop the ticket in his bid for a full term as president.

Sawyer was elected to the Ninety-fifth and to the three succeeding Congresses, serving from January 3, 1977 to January 3, 1985. However, he did not have nearly as easy a time of it as Ford or his Republican predecessors. In 1978, he only defeated Democratic challenger Dale Sprik by 0.7 percent, a difference of 1,100 votes. He defeated Sprik by seven points in a rematch. In 1982, he defeated former state representative Stephen Monsma with 53 percent of the vote. These would be the last times that a Democrat managed 40 percent of the vote in the district in the 20th century (it was renumbered as the 3rd district in 1993).

Sawyer served on the House Select Committee on Assassinations investigating the assassinations of John F. Kennedy and Martin Luther King, Jr. Sawyer was one of four members who dissented from the Committee's finding that Dictabelt evidence suggested that Kennedy was "probably assassinated as a result of a conspiracy." Responding to a question asking how he would handle the Committee's report if he were at the Justice Department, he replied: "I'd file it in a circular file." Sawyer stated that the conclusions in both cases were based on "supposition upon supposition upon supposition".

== Death ==
In 2003, Sawyer died of throat cancer at his home in Algoma Township. He is interred in Rockford Cemetery, in Rockford, Michigan.

U.S. House of Representatives
Preceded by Richard Vander Veen	Member of the U.S. House of Representatives from Michigan's 5th congressional district 1977–1985	Succeeded by Paul B. Henry
