= Fouad al-Zayat =

Syrian businessman, investor, and gambler (1941–2018)

Fouad al-Zayat (1941 – 26 March 2018) was a Syrian billionaire businessman, investor and gambler. He founded various companies including Mortimer Off Shore Services Ltd. (now run by his son and son-in-law).

al-Zayat requested the assistance of the U.S. Supreme Court in securing a payment of approximately $8 billion on German bonds that Adolf Hitler ordered into default prior to the Second World War.

According to Reuters, during the Greece corruption trails al-Zayat was "tried in absentia and sentenced to life for bribery and 17 years for money laundering".

== Lobbying controversy ==
In 2003, Fouad al-Zayat was commissioned by the Islamic Republic of Iran to help purchase a luxurious jumbo jet to be used by the Iranian president. However, the Iran and Libya Sanctions Act (ILSA) prohibited the sale.

al-Zayat met with U.S. congressman Bob Ney and lobbyists Roy Coffee and David DiStefano. According to the U.S. Justice Department, during those meetings Ney accepted "thousands of dollars worth of free casino chips" from al-Zayat. Roy Coffee and David DiStefano confirmed that they worked with Ney to seek a special government permit to let al-Zayat "sell plane parts to Iran despite U.S. trade sanctions." However, the permit never was awarded.

Bob Ney later admitted to helping al-Zayat, and was subsequently sentenced to two-and-a-half years in jail after "pleading guilty to trading political favours for money and gifts".

In 2007, the Iranian military took al-Zayat to court for failing to deliver the aircraft. Al-Zayat claimed he had not delivered the plane "because of a dispute over money". Consequently, al-Zayat won a £60m High Court battle with the Iranian military over the missing airplane.

== Gambling ==
al-Zayat is also known for his lavish gambling and is considered a whale in the casino industry. Between 1994 and 2006, al-Zayat wagered £91.5 million at the Mayfair club Aspinall's and lost £23.2 million. In 2006, Aspinall's sued al-Zayat for £2 million plus £50,000 in costs due to gambling debts incurred from blackjack losses in 2000. al-Zayat was court ordered to pay the debt, but later appealed. The appeal was successful and the ruling was overturned in 2008 under the pretense that the credit given was unlawful under the Gaming Act.

== Personal life ==
al-Zayat has 6 grandchildren

He died in 2018 from cancer.
