= Zack Space =

American politician (born 1961)

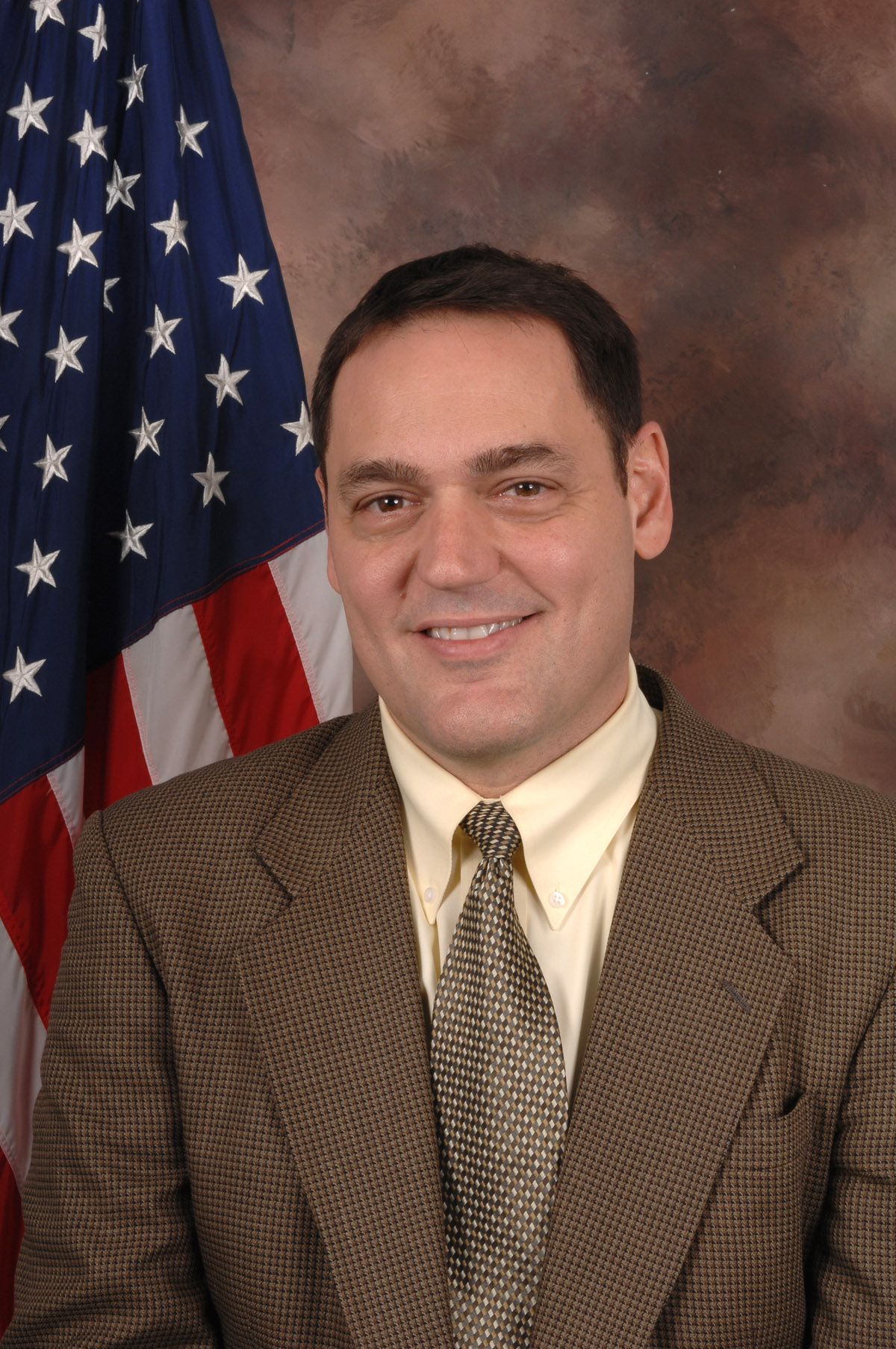

Member of the U.S. House of Representatives from Ohio's 18th district
- In office January 3, 2007 – January 3, 2011
- Preceded by: Bob Ney
- Succeeded by: Bob Gibbs

Personal details
- Born: Zachary Thompson Space; January 27, 1961 (age 65) Dover, Ohio, U.S.
- Party: Democratic
- Spouse: Mary Wade (m. 1988)
- Children: 2
- Education: Kenyon College (BA); Ohio State University (JD)

Zachary Thompson Space (born January 27, 1961) is an American lawyer and politician and the former U.S. representative for Ohio's 18th congressional district, serving from 2007 until 2011. He is a member of the Democratic Party. After serving in Congress, Space became a lobbyist and was a principal for Vorys Advisors LLC, a subsidiary of the law firm Vorys, Sater, Seymour and Pease. He ran unsuccessfully for Ohio State Auditor in 2018, significantly outperforming other members of the ticket in Appalachian Ohio counties. He is currently serving as President of Sunday Creek Horizons, a lobbying and advocacy firm founded in 2019 that serves clients in eastern and southern Ohio.

== Early life, education and career ==
Space was born on January 27, 1961, in Dover, Ohio. His family is of Greek origin, originating from the island Icaria.

His last name was an alteration of his grandfather's Greek name. His father, Socrates Space, was a Democratic chairman in Space's home county of Tuscarawas. Space graduated from Dover High School in 1979, and attended Kenyon College, where he earned All-American honors in football, and graduated with a B.A. in Political Science. Space then earned a Juris Doctor from the Ohio State University Moritz College of Law.

In 1986, Space started a law practice with his father, Socrates. Their firm, Space & Space Company, LPA, was in business for nearly 20 years and focused on consumer rights. The elder Space was also active in local politics, serving a long tenure as Chairman of the Tuscarawas County Democratic Party. He married Mary Ellen Wade, a future judge, in 1988.

Space is a member of the Tuscarawas County and State of Ohio Bar Associations. In addition to his private law practice, he has worked as a public defender and served as Special Counsel to two Attorneys General of Ohio, Anthony J. Celebrezze, Jr. and Lee Fisher.

After the death of Dover Law Director Thomas Watson, Space was appointed to fill the vacancy. He won re-election in 2001 with 70 percent of the vote, and was unopposed in the 2003 election. As Law Director, Space served as general counsel to the Dover city government and tried misdemeanor cases in the city's municipal court.

== U.S. House of Representatives ==
=== Committee assignments ===
- Committee on Energy and Commerce
  - Subcommittee on Commerce, Trade and Consumer Protection
  - Subcommittee on Communications, Technology and the Internet
  - Subcommittee on Health

Space was a member of the Blue Dog Coalition.

He is an advocate for embryonic stem cell research, a position he embraced after his son Nicholas was diagnosed with Type I diabetes at age six. Representative Space voted against the final Senate version of the Affordable Care Act after voting for the House version which included a public option. Rep. Space voted for the Waxman-Markey "cap and trade" bill allowing it to be brought out of committee and be passed by the House. American Electric Power and the Environmental Defense Fund ran a commercial congratulating Rep. Space for his vote.

== Political campaigns ==
=== 2006 ===
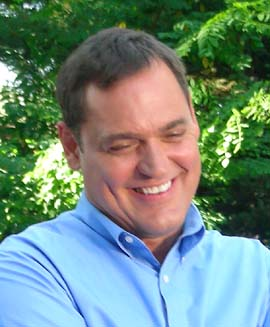
Space visits Tuscora Park in New Philadelphia, Ohio, 2006

On May 2, 2006, Space won the Democratic primary for the House seat then held by Bob Ney, defeating Democrats Jennifer Stewart, Joe Sulzer, and Ralph Applegate. Space received 39 percent of the vote, Stewart 25 percent, Sulzer 24 percent, and Applegate received 11 percent.

Republican Ney said much of the primary campaign was focused on attacking him, and said he would attempt to bring the campaign back to the issues. "It has to get back to issues," he said. "We are going to run an aggressive campaign. ... We are going to stick to the issues and show the difference between me and Zack Space." In July, a poll commissioned by the Space campaign showed Space ahead of Ney, 46 percent to 35 percent, with 19 percent undecided.

On August 7, Ney withdrew from the race, citing concerns about legal issues facing him; he pleaded guilty to charges related to the Jack Abramoff Indian lobbying scandal on October 13. In a special primary the Ohio Republican party selected State Senator Joy Padgett to replace Ney. She was dogged by questions about a business bankruptcy that she and her husband had filed. She was also seriously hampered by associations with Ney, as well as widespread scandals surrounding the Ohio Republican Party.

On November 7, Space defeated Padgett 62.1 percent to 37.9 percent. Although much more attention was paid to Brad Ellsworth's 61.0 percent to 39.0 percent defeat of John Hostettler in Indiana's 8th district, Space's victory was the largest margin of any Democrat in a Republican-held seat nationwide in 2006.

=== 2008 ===
Space defeated Republican Fred Dailey, former director of the Ohio Department of Agriculture 59.9% – 40.1%.

=== 2010 ===
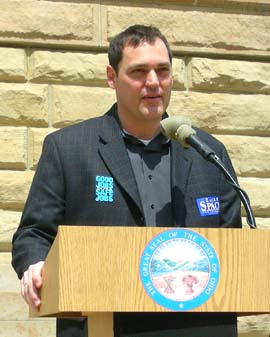
Space speaking to the Workers Memorial Day rally at the Tuscarawas County Courthouse, 2006

Space was challenged by Republican State Senator Bob Gibbs and Constitution Party Lindsey Sutton. Gibbs won the election, securing 53.9% of the vote to 40.5% that went to Space. During the campaign, Gibbs attacked Space for his role in the financial meltdown and his support for policies like cap and trade, which Gibbs argued would have been devastating for Space's district, which was predominantly made up of coal miners.

== Ohio Auditor of State campaign ==
Space formally announced his campaign for Ohio Auditor of State in August 2017 with stops in Martins Ferry, Zanesville, Columbus, and Lima. Space focused his campaign around using the auditor's office to restore confidence in Ohio's democratic process. He pledged to expose pay-to-play in Ohio's state government and mitigate against the influence of money in politics. In addition, Space campaigned for an end to partisan gerrymandering. Space also embarked on an "Ohio River Tour to Restore" in November 2017, holding 11 campaign events over three days in Scioto, Lawrence, Gallia, Meigs, Athens, Monroe, Belmont, and Jefferson counties along the Ohio River. In February 2018, Space's race for state auditor was named a National Priority Target by the National Democratic Redistricting Committee, an anti-gerrymandering organization.

In January 2018, as a campaign point Space called on politicians who took campaign contributions from the founders of the Electronic Classroom of Tomorrow (ECOT) to donate those monies back to local public schools. In May, Space's Republican opponent, Keith Faber, returned over $36,000 in ECOT campaign contributions, also claiming he "helped shut ECOT down". Politifact Ohio rated this "Mostly False". In June 2018, Space announced a plan to form a unit in the Auditor's office to investigate the full extent of the for-profit charter school scam in Ohio. Space's proposal was criticized by Faber, who argued that the auditor was already responsible for auditing all charter schools in Ohio. In August 2018, Space announced a plan to investigate the effects of NAFTA-era free trade policies on Ohio communities and workers. The plan, called Working Families First, was announced at United Steelworkers halls in Youngstown and Martins Ferry.

In September 2018, The Columbus Dispatch criticized a website launched by Faber, which included false claims made against Space and an image of Space's father which had been doctored to look like Space shaking hands with Nancy Pelosi. Space also criticized the doctored photograph as a campaign point. In October, three weeks before the election, the Associated Press reported that Faber had incurred penalties for failing to pay nearly $5,500 in taxes on time on multiple properties over multiple years. Space argued these failures would make Faber a hypocritical state auditor. After Space in September 2018 was endorsed by the Columbus Dispatch and Akron Beacon Journal, the Cleveland Plain Dealer endorsed Space in mid-October, citing Faber's reputation for partisanship. Space was defeated in the November election by less than 3.5%. Space led the Democratic ticket, running ahead of the four other statewide Democratic ticket, and ran between 5-10% ahead of the Democratic ticket across Appalachian Ohio.

== Personal life ==
Space is a managing member of several closely held companies that have constructed and operated hotels in Tuscarawas County. He has served as a board member for the Tuscarawas County Board of Elections, the Tuscarawas County Board of Intellectual Disabilities and Developmental Disabilities, the Ohio Association of Nonprofit Organizations, the Ohio Legislative Black Caucus Foundation, CoalBlue, the Rural Community Assistance Partnership, and as a steering committee member for the Central Ohio Juvenile Diabetes Research Foundation and Clean Fuels Ohio.

Space is now President of Sunday Creek Horizons, a lobbying firm described on its website as "a mission-driven advocacy, strategic communications, and business development firm focused on improving the lives of Appalachian Ohioans." Sunday Creek Horizons was founded in 2019 and is based in Athens, Ohio. Space’s partners are Will Drabold and Zachary Reizes.

Space is a member of St. George Greek Orthodox Church of Massillon, Ohio.

U.S. House of Representatives
Preceded by Bob Ney	Member of the U.S. House of Representatives from Ohio's 18th congressional district 2007–2011	Succeeded by Bob Gibbs
Party political offices
Preceded by John Carney	Democratic nominee for Auditor of Ohio; 2018	Succeeded by Taylor Sappington
U.S. order of precedence (ceremonial)
Preceded by Martin Hoke as Former U.S. Representative	Order of precedence of the United States as Former U.S. Representative	Succeeded by Steve Austria as Former U.S. Representative
