= Mike McCullough (politician) =

American politician

Michael McCullough

Member of the Ohio House of Representatives from the 95th district
- In office June 30, 1992-December 31, 1992
- Preceded by: Joe Secrest
- Succeeded by: Joy Padgett

Personal details
- Party: Democratic

Mike McCullough is a former member of the Ohio House of Representatives.
