= Richard Vander Veen =

American politician (1922–2006)

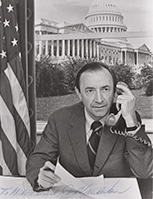

Member of the U.S. House of Representatives from Michigan's 5th district
- In office February 18, 1974 – January 3, 1977
- Preceded by: Gerald Ford
- Succeeded by: Harold S. Sawyer

Personal details
- Born: November 26, 1922 Grand Rapids, Michigan, U.S.
- Died: March 3, 2006 (aged 83) East Grand Rapids, Michigan, U.S.
- Party: Democratic
- Education: University of South Carolina (B.S.); Harvard Law School (LL.B.)

Military service
- Allegiance: United States of America
- Branch/service: United States Army
- Years of service: 1941–1946, 1950-1952
- Rank: Junior Lieutenant
- Battles/wars: World War II • South Pacific Theater; Korean War

Richard Franklin Vander Veen (November 26, 1922 – March 3, 2006) was a politician from the U.S. state of Michigan.

== Early life and education ==
Born in Grand Rapids, Michigan, Vander Veen attended the local public schools and graduated from Muskegon High School in 1940. He earned a BS from the University of South Carolina in 1946 and an LL.B. from Harvard Law School in 1949. He was admitted to the Michigan bar in 1949 and commenced practice in Grand Rapids. In 1951, he, Walter Freihofer and George Cook formed what was to become the third-largest law firm in Grand Rapids. He retired from the law firm when he was elected to Congress. He is a relative of musician Anthony Kiedis.

== Military service ==
With the outbreak of World War II, Vander Veen enlisted in the United States Navy in January 1941 and served until 1946, seeing active duty in the South Pacific Theater. He also served in the Korean War from 1950 to 1952 with the rank of lieutenant (junior grade).

== Political career ==
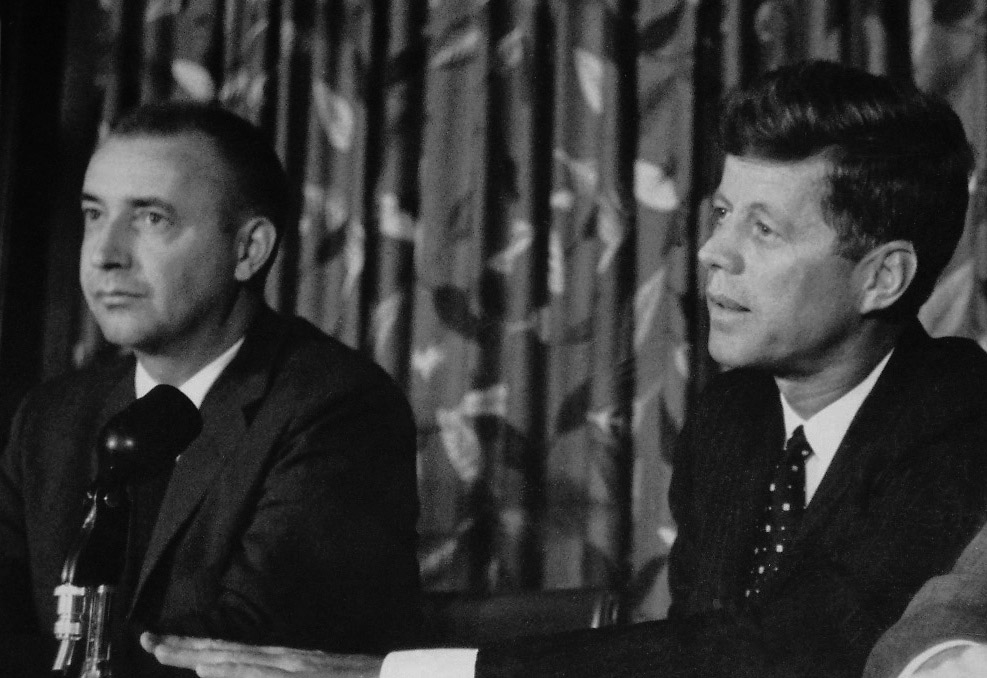
Vander Veen with President John F. Kennedy in 1961

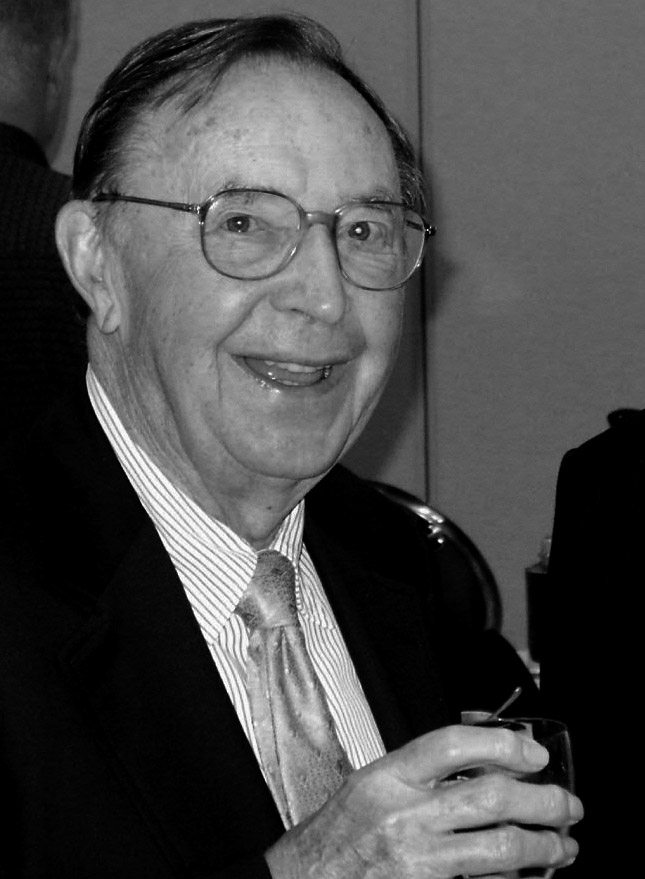
Vander Veen in 2002

In 1958, Vander Veen made an unsuccessful bid as the Democratic Party candidate to unseat incumbent Republican U.S. Representative Gerald Ford in Michigan's 5th congressional district. He became chair of the Michigan Fifth District Democratic Party in 1959 and was an unsuccessful candidate in the Democratic primary election for Lieutenant Governor of Michigan in 1960, losing to T. John Lesinski. He was chairman of the Michigan State Democratic Convention in 1960, and was a delegate to the state conventions in 1962 and 1964. He served on the Michigan State Mental Health Commission, 1958–1963, and the Michigan State Highway Commission, 1964–1969. In 1969, he was elected to the East Grand Rapids Board of Education.

After Gerald Ford resigned his House seat in 1973 to become Vice President of the United States, Vander Veen was elected in a special election on February 18, 1974, to fill Ford's seat in the 93rd Congress. Vander Veen's election was seen as a stunning upset in what had historically been one of the most Republican urbanized districts in the country. The Republican candidate, Robert VanderLaan, was the Republican leader of the Michigan Senate and, up to that point, had never lost an election. Vander Veen turned the election into a referendum on the increasingly unpopular U.S. President Richard Nixon. He stopped campaigning directly against his opponent, and instead took out newspaper advertisements "in which he promised to do his utmost to dislodge Nixon and turn the presidency over to Ford, a political folk hero in the district." This upset caused a panic in the Republican Party leadership, as it appeared to foreshadow more losses for the party in the November elections. Political analyst Larry Sabato writes in his Crystal Ball newsletter that Vander Veen's capture of Ford's district, long thought to be solidly Republican, after Ford had been elevated to the Vice Presidency was an electrifying victory that foreshadowed the Democratic Watergate landslide of November 1974. (see also 1974 Midterm Senate and House elections)

Vander Veen was reelected in November 1974 to a full term in the 94th Congress, but lost his seat in 1976 to Republican Kent County prosecuting attorney Harold S. Sawyer. He was the only Democrat to represent Grand Rapids in U.S. Congress until Hillary Scholten won the seat, by now renumbered as the 3rd district, in 2022.

In 1978, Vander Veen ran for the United States Senate, but lost his bid for the Democratic nomination to Carl Levin, who went on to win the general election in November.

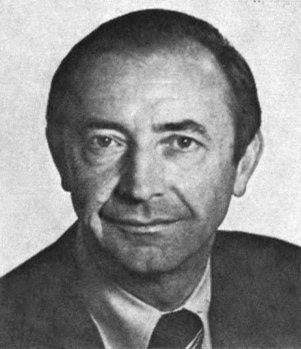
Richard Vander Veen as seen in the 94th Congressional Pictorial Directory

Vander Veen formed two environmental companies: Resource Energy and Enigered. In 1990, he founded the Ryerson Library Foundation, and served as its president.

After his service in Congress, Vander Veen served as a member of the Michigan State Waterways Commission. Vander Veen died of prostate cancer at his home in East Grand Rapids at the age of 83.

U.S. House of Representatives
Preceded by Gerald Ford	Member of the U.S. House of Representatives from Michigan's 3rd congressional district 1974–1977	Succeeded by Harold S. Sawyer
