= Sam Speck =

American politician

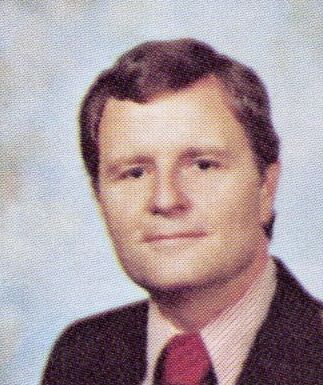

Member of the Ohio Senate from the 20th district
- In office January 3, 1977 – December 2, 1983
- Preceded by: Robert T. Secrest
- Succeeded by: Bob Ney

Member of the Ohio House of Representatives from the 95th district
- In office January 3, 1971 – December 31, 1976
- Preceded by: Don Goddard
- Succeeded by: Tom Johnson

Personal details
- Born: Samuel Wallace Speck, Jr. January 31, 1937 (age 89) Canton, Ohio, United States
- Party: Republican

Samuel Wallace Speck, Jr. (born 1937) is an American politician, a former member of the Ohio Senate, where he served from 1977 to 1983. He represented the 20th District.

== Education ==
Speck earned his bachelor's degree from Muskingum University and his master's and doctoral degrees from Harvard University.

== Activities ==
Speck pointed to several provisions in Great Lakes Compact that he believes are violated by the Lake Erie water-use bill.

== Awards ==
- 2004 – National Governors Association's Annual Award for Distinguished Service in State Government
