= James E. Carnes =

American politician (1942–2026)

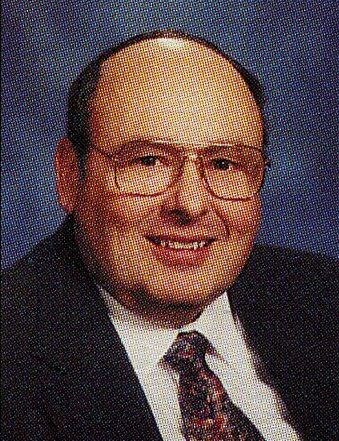

Member of the Ohio Senate from the 20th district
- In office January 3, 1995 – January 6, 2004
- Preceded by: Bob Ney
- Succeeded by: Joy Padgett

Personal details
- Born: February 19, 1942 Wheeling, West Virginia, U.S.
- Died: April 25, 2026 (aged 84) St. Clairsville, Ohio, U.S.

James Edward Carnes (February 19, 1942 – April 25, 2026) was an American politician who was a member of the Ohio Senate from 1995 to 2004, representing the 20th district, which encompassed much of Southeastern Ohio. He was succeeded by Joy Padgett, who was appointed to fill out the remainder of Carnes's term upon his resignation in 2004.

== Life and career ==
Carnes was born in Wheeling, West Virginia, on February 19, 1942.

Following his departure from the Ohio Senate, Carnes became the Deputy Director of the Ohio Department of Natural Resources.

Carnes died at his home in St. Clairsville, Ohio, on April 25, 2026, at the age of 84.
