= Electronic Classroom of Tomorrow =

- 3700 S High Street, Suite 95; Columbus, Ohio 43207-9902; United States

Information
- Type: Charter / Community
- Established: 2000
- Closed: January 18, 2018
- School district: All of Ohio
- Head of school: Brittny Pierson, Superintendent
- Staff: 300
- Faculty: 445.5
- Grades: K-12
- Enrollment: 14,453 (2015)
- Colors: Green, Silver
- Athletics: None
- Mascot: Eagle
- Accreditation: North Central Association/AdvanceEd
- C.E.E.B. Code: 361537

The Electronic Classroom of Tomorrow (ECOT) was a community/charter school based in Columbus, Ohio, United States. It was sponsored by the Lucas County Educational Service Center of Lake Erie West (ESCLEW) in Toledo, by chapter 3314 of the Ohio Revised Code.

Students performed their work either on computers they already owned or on those supplied to them by the school. Work was performed online via secure intranet connections.

ECOT had the lowest on-time graduation rate of all high schools in the country, despite its large graduating class size. In 2016, it shut down amid a legal battle over alleged misreporting of the number of students, which was used to determine state funding.

== History ==
ECOT was founded in 2000 by William "Bill" Lager, under an agreement with Lucas County Educational Service Center, and was managed by his company, Altair Learning Management. Lager made extensive contributions to Ohio Republican politicians.

In 2016, the Ohio Department of Education determined that ECOT had overstated the number of students it served and demanded repayment of $80 million in state funding. ECOT disputed this, disagreeing with the way the state calculated student participation. In January 2018 ECOT then offered a lower settlement amount, but the department refused that offer and insisted on full repayment. In turn, the board of ECOT's sponsor (Educational Service Center of Lake Erie West) voted to close the school immediately.

In May 2018, the Auditor of State issued a subpoena to preserve and obtain records from ECOT if the dispute rose to a criminal case. In June 2022, the Auditor ordered the shuttered school to repay over $117 million in funds the school was deemed ineligible to have received.

== Regulatory status ==
Under Ohio law, "community schools" are independent public schools that offer school choice to parents, students, and teachers. They are accountable to the public by a contract with a sponsor, such as a school district, or the Ohio Department of Education (ODE). In ECOT's case, the school was accountable to ESCLEW and its publicly elected Board. Community schools cannot charge tuition and must follow all laws about health, public safety, and civil rights.

Students were required to take state-mandated proficiency/achievement tests and other examinations prescribed by law. Students were also required to pass the Ohio Graduation Test to receive a diploma.

ECOT was not a "home schooling" program. It was a public community school, subject to all the laws and regulations thereof.

Students were expected to put in 25 hours of educational work per week during the school year. This work could be divided between online live sessions and independent or extracurricular activities. The time spent was comparable to the time that students in "brick-and-mortar" schools spent. Attendance did not need to adhere to traditional time conventions; however, that gave flexibility to students and families not typically available in traditional educational settings. However, ECOT was unable to demonstrate that the majority of students met this requirement.

== Structure ==
There were four schools:

- Elementary School: K-3rd grades.
- Junior High: 4-6th grades.
- Middle School: 7th & 8th grades.
- High school: 9-12th grades.

Each school was supervised by its principal, except in the high school. Due to the number of students that were enrolled, there were 4 principals.

== Graduates ==
The school's first graduation ceremonies were held in the Ohio State House. In later years, larger venues became necessary due to Public Occupancy Limits, and, up until the closure in 2018, were being held at Jerome Schottenstein Center. ECOT typically had the largest graduating classes of any single school in the United States. ECOT's Class of 2013 included more than 2,500 graduates.

== Criticism ==
While ECOT graduated large high school classes (2,371 students in 2016), more students dropped out of ECOT or failed to finish high school within four years than at any other school in the country. In 2014, the graduation rate was under 39%. Lager claimed that this was because many students arrived at the school behind, affected by poverty, special needs, and mobility, but fewer ECOT students were affected compared to other schools. Without physical classrooms and with high pupil-to-teacher ratios, they could not provide support in person. Guidance counselors carried caseloads of up to 500 students each, and the school-wide pupil-teacher ratio was 30 to one.

An Ohio Republican state senator said, “When you take on a difficult student, you’re basically saying, ‘We feel that our model can help this child be successful. And if you can’t help them be successful, at some point you have to say your model isn’t working, and if your model is not working, perhaps public dollars shouldn’t be going to pay for it.”

Critics said that companies associated with Lager profited from government funding, but did not deliver the promised value. In fiscal year 2014, ECOT paid companies that were associated with Lager nearly $23 million, or 1/5 of its $115 million government revenue.

“The growth has been huge,” said Aaron Churchill, of the Thomas B. Fordham Institute. “There are clearly a lot of questions about the quality of the education they’re putting out. I’d be curious to know why parents are selecting it. Aaron Churchill also commented that the graduation rate of ECOT and online schools are not accurately depicted by using the standard ACGR. [He] provides the example that if [a] student comes to ECOT after 3 years of failing in public high school, [the student is] counted against ECOT. ECOT, according to the State of Ohio, has 49.3% of its students deemed as public school drop-outs.”

ECOT spent almost $11 million on communications in 2014, which included advertising. About half of ECOT's revenue went to employee salaries and benefits, compared with about 80% in traditional districts.

Critics say that ECOT owed its existence to its lavish campaign donations, mostly to Ohio Republicans. Lager has spent at least $1.13 million on Ohio campaigns from 2010 to 2015.
