= Congressional Pictorial Directory =

Book by United States Congress Joint Committee on Printing

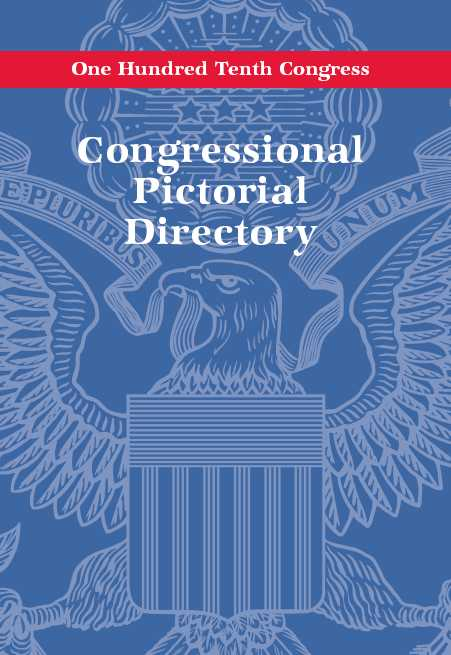
- 110th Congress, June 2007
- Author: United States Congress Joint Committee on Printing
- Language: English
- Subject: Political Reference
- Genre: Non-fiction
- Publisher: United States Government Printing Office
- Publication date: 2007
- Publication place: United States
- Media type: Print (Paperback)
- ISBN: 978-0-16-077870-4

The Congressional Pictorial Directory is a picture directory of leaders and members of the United States Congress and other key officials including the President. It is published at least once every Congressional Term and is in the public domain. It was previously published as the Pocket Congressional Directory.

Directories since the 82nd Congress (1951–1953) are available online from the Government Publishing Office, Earlier versions as well as printed versions since 1997 are available from most Federal Depository Libraries. The current version is also available for purchase from the United States Government Printing Office.
