= Joy Padgett =

American politician

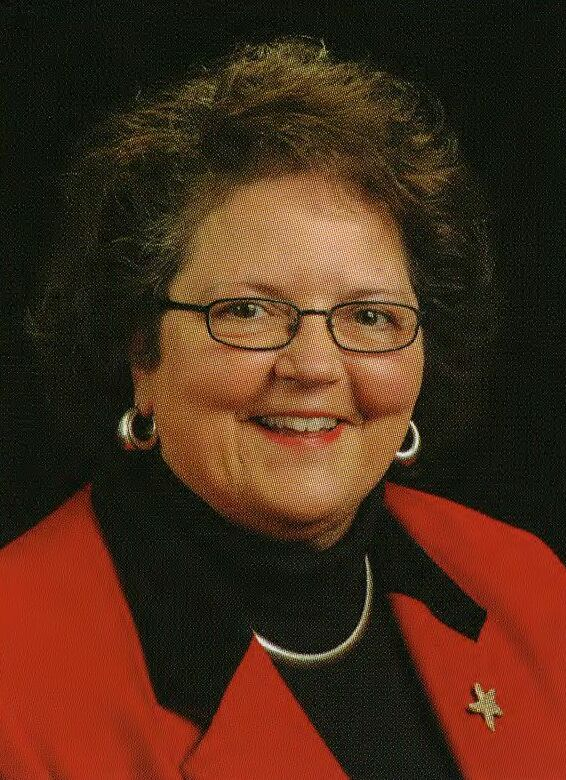

Member of the Ohio Senate from the 20th district
- In office January 6, 2004-December 31, 2008
- Preceded by: James E. Carnes
- Succeeded by: Jimmy Stewart

Member of the Ohio House of Representatives from the 95th district
- In office January 3, 1993-June 30, 1999
- Preceded by: Mike McCullough
- Succeeded by: Jim Aslanides

Personal details
- Party: Republican

Joy Ann Padgett (née Conrad, February 4, 1947 in Coshocton, Ohio) is a former Republican member of the Ohio Senate, representing the 20th district until the end of 2008. In 2006, dogged by personal scandals, she ran unsuccessfully for Lieutenant Governor of Ohio and for Congress in Ohio's 18th congressional district. Her run for Congress was the result of the decision of Bob Ney to bow out of the race and plead guilty to corruption charges.

== Political career ==
Padgett was first appointed to the Ohio Senate in January 2004 and elected that following November. Prior to her election, she was the director of the Office of Appalachia in Governor Bob Taft's administration. Before that, she served from 1993 to 1999 in the Ohio House of Representatives and, prior to that, had been a school teacher.

In her 2004 bid for her first full term in the Ohio Senate, Padgett was challenged by Democrat Terry Anderson of Athens, Ohio, who in the 1980s had been held hostage by Islamic radicals in Lebanon when working on a story for the Associated Press. Much of her campaign centered on social issues, namely that of same sex marriage. They stated that if Anderson were elected he would allow gays to get married. These ads were typically played with the theme song from Twilight Zone saying "...men marrying men, women marrying women... What kind of world does Terry Anderson want?" Many of these commercials were considered homophobic, and drew attention and condemnation. Other ads attempted to smear Terry Anderson as a terrorist sympathizer, often ignoring the truth about his imprisonment.

The match-up was the only seriously contested Ohio Senate race in 2004. Padgett won re-election with 54 percent of the vote.

== Loans, bankruptcies, and transfers ==
Padgett and her then-husband Donald were owners of the Main Office Supply Co. Her husband ran the business for three decades; she was the company's treasurer. The Coshocton business began experiencing financial troubles in 1999; it went from 40 employees to about eight when it closed in 2006.

In August 2004, the Small Business Administration gave the business a $737,000 loan guarantee on a loan from the JP Morgan Chase Bank. On the same day, the Padgetts renegotiated a three-year-old loan for $100,000 from the Home Loan Savings Bank in Coshocton. In October 2005, the Padgetts filed for bankruptcy for their business and defaulted on the two loans. The bankruptcy filing was subsequently tossed out by a federal judge when the Padgetts violated a court order.

On June 15, 2006, the Padgetts filed for personal bankruptcy, listing $1.16 million in debts against $202,143 in assets. Joy Padgett said most of the debt came from Main Office Supply Co. As of September 8, the Padgetts owed at least $20,000 on the local loan, and more than $720,000 on the federally guaranteed loan.

== 2006 campaign ==
=== Candidate for lieutenant governor ===
Early in 2005, Padgett joined Ohio Attorney General Jim Petro's campaign for governor as a regional chair and worked on his behalf while he and lieutenant governor candidate Phil Heimlich campaigned. In January 2006, following Heimlich's decision to leave the ticket in order to run for re-election as a Hamilton County Commissioner, Petro named Padgett his running mate as candidate for Lt. Governor.

The primary election was held on May 2, 2006. Ohio Secretary of State Ken Blackwell and State Representative Tom Raga were victorious over the Petro/Padgett team.

=== Republican candidate for Congress ===
On August 7, 2006, Bob Ney announced he was withdrawing his candidacy in the 2006 election. Padgett announced that Ney and House Majority Leader John Boehner, who represents another district in Ohio, had asked her to run in his place.

On August 14, 2006, Ney officially withdrew from the race for Congress. Because that occurred before August 19 (80 or more days before the election), Ohio Revised Code 3513.312 applied, thus requiring "the vacancy in the party nomination so created shall be filled by a special election." If Ney had waited until August 20, section 3513.31 of the Ohio Revised Code would have pertained and Ney's replacement in the November general election could have been named by a district committee of the Ohio Republican party.

On August 10, Ohio Attorney General Jim Petro ruled that the "sore loser" provision in Ohio law (ORC 3513.04, which says that "No person who seeks party nomination for an office or position at a primary election by declaration of candidacy or by declaration of intent to be a write-in candidate ... shall be permitted to become a candidate by nominating petition or by declaration of intent to be a write-in candidate at the following general election") did not apply to Padgett running for Ney's seat because it was for a different office. Padgett was a losing candidate for lieutenant governor in the May 2006 primary (she was paired with Petro, who was running for governor.)

Some argued that Padgett was subject to another law—a provision put into the state's budget bill in 2005 by Republicans. That provision (ORC section 3513.052(B)) prevents someone from running for office "if that person, for the same election, has already filed a declaration of candidacy, a declaration of intent to be a write-in candidate, or a nominating petition, or has become a candidate through party nomination at a primary election or by the filling of a vacancy." Petro's office was not asked for an opinion on that matter.

The Ohio Democratic Party initially indicated that it would contest Padgett's eligibility by filing a lawsuit when she became a candidate. However, on August 18, the party said that it would not, because Padgett faced six opponents in the special primary and avoiding a lawsuit would save money for their fall campaign. But a brother to one of those six candidates filed a protest before the August 19 deadline.

The Tuscarawas County elections board heard the complaint on August 20 and voted 2–1 along party lines to reject it. One Democrat, Socrates Space, abstained from voting because of a conflict of interest; his son was the Democratic nominee in the same race.

Padgett originally faced seven Republican opponents in the special primary on September 14. But on August 22, Dover mayor Rick Homrighausen announced he would withdraw and endorsed Padgett. Ney aide John Bennett also withdrew, and candidate Gregory Zelenitz was rejected by the Tuscarawas County Board of Elections. Padgett overwhelmingly won the primary election with over 9,523 of the 14,065 votes cast.

She faced Zack Space, a Dover, Ohio lawyer and hotel developer, in the November general election. Space had won the Democratic primary with 39 percent of the vote. Space easily defeated Padgett on November 6, 2006, 129,687 to 79,286.

== Retirement from Ohio Senate ==
In September 2007, Padgett announced that she would not run for another term in 2008. Soon after, State Rep. Jimmy Stewart, R-Albany, announced he would run for the 20th District Senate seat in 2008. Stewart won the seat, and Padgett retired from Ohio politics when her term expired in December 2008. United Conservatives of Ohio gave her a 77% evaluation.
