= Robert May (producer) =

American film producer

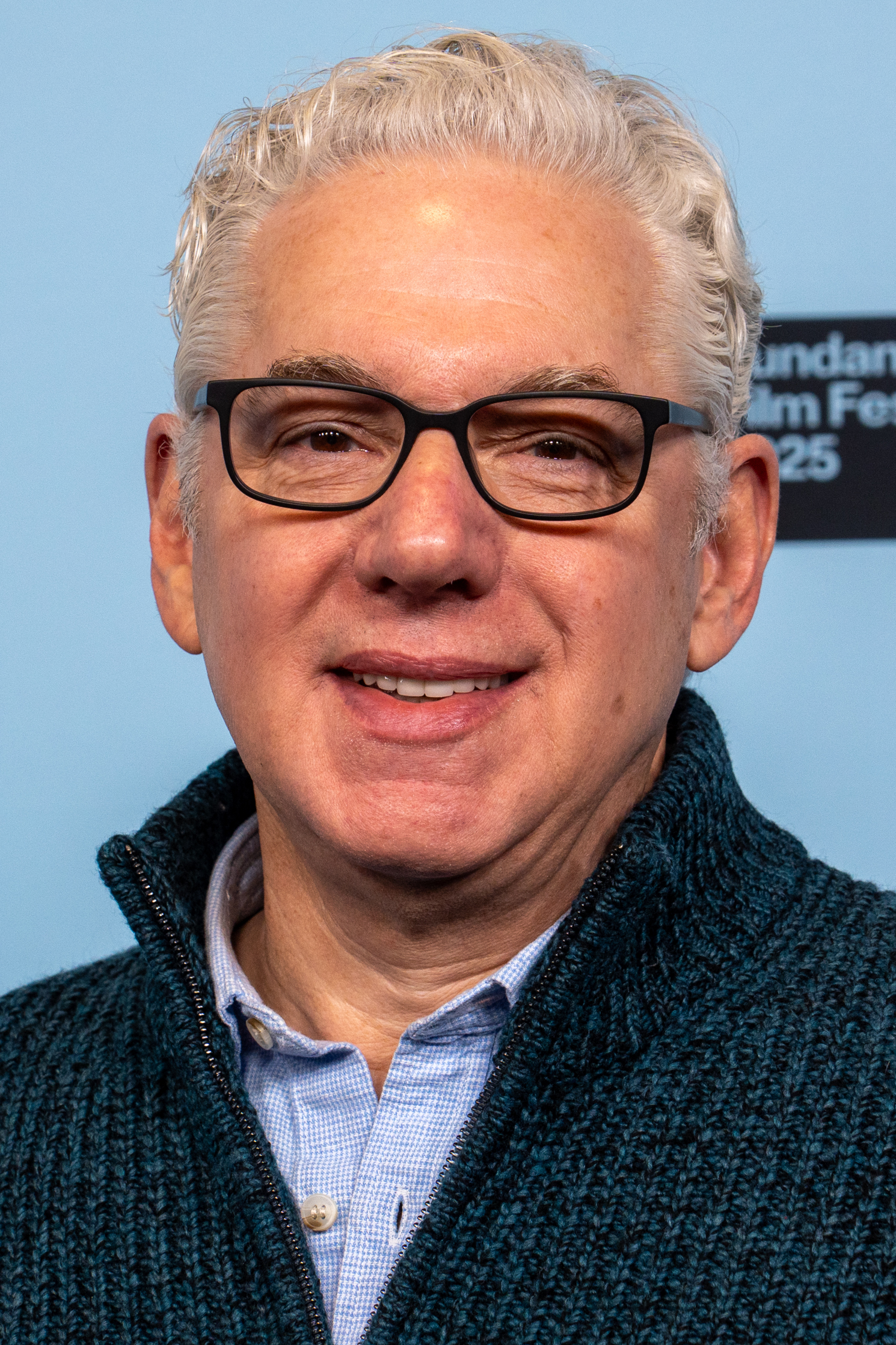
- May at the 2025 Sundance Film Festival

Robert May is an American film producer. He was a producer of The War Tapes and The Station Agent, an executive producer of Stevie and The Fog of War, and the director and a producer of Kids for Cash. The Fog of War won the Academy Award for Best Documentary.

== Kids for cash ==
In the Kids for cash scandal, judge Mark Ciavarella, who promoted a platform of zero tolerance, received kickbacks for constructing a private prison that housed juvenile offenders, and then proceeded to fill the prison by sentencing children to extended stays in juvenile detention for offenses as minimal as mocking a principal on Myspace, scuffles in hallways, trespassing in a vacant building, and shoplifting DVDs from Wal-mart. Critics of zero-tolerance policies argue that harsh punishments for minor offences are normalized.

May directed Kids for Cash, a 2013 documentary film about the "kids for cash" scandal which unfolded in 2008 over judicial kickbacks in Wilkes-Barre, Pennsylvania. May is a critic of the School-to-prison pipeline and zero tolerance law enforcement for juveniles. In the documentary, May interviews experts on adolescent behaviour, who argue that the zero tolerance model has become a dominant approach to policing juvenile offences after the Columbine shooting.

Critical response for Kids for Cash has been positive. On Rotten Tomatoes, the film an approval rating of 92% based on 36 reviews.
