= Zero tolerance =

Punishment policy with no discretion for leniency

A zero-tolerance policy is one which imposes a punishment for every infraction of a stated rule. Zero-tolerance policies forbid people in positions of authority from exercising discretion or changing punishments to fit the circumstances subjectively; they are required to impose a predetermined punishment regardless of individual culpability, extenuating circumstances, or history. This predetermined punishment, whether mild or severe, is always meted out.

Zero-tolerance policies are studied in criminology and are common in both formal and informal policing systems around the world. The policies also appear in informal situations where there may be sexual harassment or Internet misuse in educational and workplace environments. In 2014, the mass incarceration in the United States based upon low-level offenses has resulted in an outcry on the use of zero tolerance in schools and communities.

Little evidence supports the claimed effectiveness of zero-tolerance policies. One underlying problem is that there are a great many reasons why people hesitate to intervene, or to report behavior they find to be unacceptable or unlawful. Zero-tolerance policies address, at best, only a few of these reasons.

== Etymology ==
According to the Online Etymology Dictionary, the first recorded use of the term "zero tolerance" was in 1972 and was originally used in US politics.

However, the term appears as early as 1939 in reference to plant diseases ("While a zero tolerance may seem a severe penalty ..."), in 1942 in reference to optical equipment ("They cut and polish glass precisely to 'zero tolerance,' ..."), and in 1945 in reference to poultry diseases ("Your safety is in buying chicks hatched from breeders showing zero tolerance."). It also appeared in the mid-1960s, in reference to an absolute ban on the pesticide heptachlor by the US Food and Drug Administration. For example, an article that appeared in the June 1963 issue of Popular Mechanics stated "Heptachlor, though, is even more toxic and has been given a 'zero tolerance' by the FDA; that is, not even the slightest trace of heptachlor is permitted on food."

== History ==
The idea behind zero-tolerance policies can be traced back to the Safe and Clean Neighborhoods Act, which was approved in New Jersey in 1973 and had the same underlying assumptions. The ideas behind the 1973 New Jersey policy were later popularized in 1982, when a US cultural magazine, The Atlantic Monthly, published an article by James Q. Wilson and George L. Kelling about the broken windows theory of crime. Their name for the idea comes from the following example:

Consider a building with a few broken windows. If the windows are not repaired, the tendency is for vandals to break a few more windows. Eventually, they may even break into the building, and if it's unoccupied, perhaps become squatters or light fires inside. Or consider a sidewalk. Some litter accumulates. Soon, more litter accumulates. Eventually, people even start leaving bags of trash from take-out restaurants.

According to scholars, zero tolerance is the concept of giving carte blanche to the police for the inflexible repression of minor offenses, homeless people, and the disorders associated with them. (Note: "anti-social behaviours associated with the homeless" as in Kelling's terminology.) A well-known criticism to this approach is that it redefines social problems in terms of security, it considers the poor as criminals, and it reduces crimes to only "street crimes," those committed by lower social classes and excludes white-collar crimes.

On the historical examples of the application of zero tolerance kind of policies, nearly all the scientific studies conclude that it failed to play the leading role in the reduction of crimes that is claimed by its advocates. On the other hand, large majorities of people who are living in communities in which zero-tolerance policing has been followed believe that it has actually played a key, leading role in reducing crime in their communities. It has been alleged that in New York City, the decline of the crime rate had started well before Rudy Giuliani came to power in 1993. None of the decreasing processes had any particular inflection under him, and during the same period, the decrease in crime was the same in the other major US cities, even those with an opposite security policy. However, the experience of the vast majority of New Yorkers led them to precisely the opposite conclusion and allowed a Republican to win and retain the Mayor's office for the first time in decades, in large part because of the perception that zero-tolerance policing was playing key to the city's improving crime situation. On the other hand, some argue that in 1984-1987, the city had already experienced a policy similar to Giuliani's but instead faced an increase in the crime rate.

Two American specialists, Edward Maguire, a professor at American University, and John Eck from the University of Cincinnati, rigorously evaluated all the scientific work designed to test the effectiveness of the police in the fight against crime. They concluded that "neither the number of policemen engaged in the battle, or internal changes and organizational culture of law enforcement agencies (such as the introduction of community policing) have by themselves any impact on the evolution of offenses." They argue that the crime decrease was caused by not the work of the police and the judiciary but economic and demographic factors: mainly an unprecedented economic growth with jobs for millions of young people and a shift from the use of crack towards other drugs.

An alternative argument comes from Kelling and William Bratton, Giuliani's original police chief, who argue that broken windows policing methods contributed to the decrease in crime but they were not a form of zero tolerance:

Critics use the term "zero tolerance" in a pejorative sense to suggest that Broken Windows policing is a form of zealotry—the imposition of rigid, moralistic standards of behavior on diverse populations. It is not. Broken Windows is a highly discretionary police activity that requires careful training, guidelines, and supervision, as well as an ongoing dialogue with neighborhoods and communities to ensure that it is properly conducted

Sheldon Wein has set out a list of six characteristics of a zero-tolerance policy:

1. Full enforcement (all those for whom there is adequate evidence that they have violated the rule are to be identified)
2. Lack of prosecutorial discretion (for every plausibly accused person, it is determined whether the person has in fact violated the policy)
3. Strict constructivist interpretation (no room for narrow interpretation of the rule)
4. Strict liability (no excuses or justifications)
5. Mandatory punishment (not under a mandatory minimum penalty)
6. Harsh punishment (mandatory minimum penalty is considered relatively harsh given the nature of the crime).

Wein sees those points as representing "focal meaning" of the concept. Not all must met literally, but any policy that clearly meets all six of those conditions would definitely be seen as a case of a zero-tolerance policy.

== Applications ==
=== Bullying in the workplace ===
Various institutions have undertaken zero-tolerance policies such as in the military, in the workplace, and in schools in an effort to propagate the persecution of behavior deemed socially disordered or unacceptable. Proponents hope that such policies will underscore the commitment of administrators to prevent such behavior.

Others raise a concern about that use of zero-tolerance policies, a concern that derives from an analysis of errors of omission and errors of commission. The reasoning is that failure to proscribe unacceptable behavior may lead to errors of omission, and too little will be done. However, zero tolerance may be seen as a kind of ruthless management, which may lead to a perception of "too much being done." If people fear that their co-workers or fellow students may be fired, terminated, or expelled, they may not come forward at all when they see behavior deemed unacceptable. Thus, a too stringent policy may actually reduce reports of illegal behavior.

=== Narcotics ===
In the United States, zero tolerance, an approach against drugs, was originally designed as a part of the war on drugs under Presidents Ronald Reagan and George H. W. Bush – ostensibly to curb the transfer of drugs at the borders. Law enforcement was to target the drug users, rather than the transporters or suppliers, under the assumption that harsh sentences and strict enforcement of personal use would reduce demand and strike at root cause of the drug problem. The policy did not require additional laws; existing law was instead enacted with less leniency. Similar concepts in other countries, such as Sweden, Italy, Japan, Singapore China, India, and Russia have since been labeled zero-tolerance.

A consistence of zero tolerance is the absolute dichotomy between the legality of any use and no use and the equating all illicit drugs and any form of use as undesirable and harmful to society. That contrasts the views of those who stress the disparity in harmfulness among drugs and would like to distinguish between occasional drug use and problem drug use. Although some harm reductionists also see drug use as generally undesirable, they hold that the resources would do more good if they were allocated toward helping problem drug users, instead of combating all drug users. For example, research from Switzerland indicates that emphasis on problem drug users "seems to have contributed to the image of heroin as unattractive for young people."

More generally, zero-tolerance advocates hold the aim of ridding society of all illicit drug use and that criminal justice has an important role in that endeavor. The Swedish Parliament, for example, set the vision "a drug-free society" as the official goal for the country's drug policy in 1978. The visions were to prompt new practices inspired by Nils Bejerot that were later called "zero tolerance". In 1980, the Swedish Minister of Justice dropped its practice of giving waivers for possession of drugs for personal use after years of its lowering of thresholds. The same year, police began to prioritize drug users and street-level drug crimes over drug distributors. In 1988, all non-medicinally prescribed usage became illegal, and in 1993, the enforcement of personal use was eased by permitting the police to take blood or urine samples from suspects. The unrelenting approach towards drug users, together with generous treatment opportunities, has received the United Nations Office on Drugs and Crime's approval and is cited by the United Nations as one of the main reasons for Sweden's relatively-low drug prevalence rates. However, that interpretation of the statistics and the more general success of Sweden's drug policies are disputed.

=== Driving ===
The term is used in the context of drunk driving to refer to a lower illegal blood alcohol content for drivers under the age of 21. The standard legal limit for adult drivers in almost all US states is 0.08%, with Utah being the exception at 0.05%. For drivers under 21, all 50 states have zero-tolerance laws setting the prohibited level between 0.00% and 0.02%. A strict 0.02% limit also applies to drivers aged 18 to 20 in Puerto Rico, a US territory, despite its legal drinking age being 18.

Belgium, Finland, France, Germany, and Sweden have zero-tolerance laws for drugs and driving in Europe, as opposed to the other main legal approach in which laws forbidding impaired driving are enacted instead. Legislation varies in different countries that practice zero tolerance on drug use for drivers. Only a limited set of (common) drugs is included in the zero-tolerance legislation in Germany and Belgium. However, in Finland and Sweden, all controlled substances fall into the scope of zero tolerance unless they are covered by a prescription.

In Argentina, the Cordoba State Highway Patrol enforces a zero-tolerance policy.

In Asia, Japan also practices zero tolerance. People receive a fine and can be fired even the next morning if there are still traces of alcohol. Foreigners may even be deported.

=== In schools ===
Zero-tolerance policies have been adopted in schools and other education venues around the world. The policies are usually promoted as preventing drug abuse, violence, and gang activity in schools. Common zero-tolerance policies concern possession or use of recreational drugs or weapons. Students and sometimes staff, parents, and other visitors who possess a banned item or perform any prohibited action for any reason are automatically punished. School administrators are barred from using their judgment, reducing severe punishments to be proportional to minor offenses, or considering extenuating circumstances. For example, the policies treat possession of a knife identically, regardless of whether the knife is a blunt table knife being used to eat a meal, kitchen knives used in food technology classes, craft knives used in art classes, or a switchblade with no reasonable practical or educational value. Such policies are thus sometimes derided as "zero intelligence policies."

There is no credible evidence that zero tolerance reduces violence or drug abuse by students.

The unintended negative consequences are clearly documented and sometimes severe: school suspension and expulsion result in a number of negative outcomes for both schools and students. Although the policies are facially neutral, minority children are the most likely to suffer the negative consequences of zero tolerance.

The policies have also resulted in embarrassing publicity for schools. Also, they have been struck down by the courts and by Departments of Education and weakened by legislatures.

== Criticism ==
Some critics have argued that zero-tolerance policing violates the Law Enforcement Code of Conduct passed by the International Association of Chiefs of Police. The code requires that police behave in a courteous and fair manner, treat all citizens in a respectable and decent manner, and never use unnecessary force. Criminologist Matthew Barnett Robinson criticized the practice:

Zero-tolerance policing runs counter to community policing and logical crime prevention efforts. To whatever degree street sweeps are viewed by citizens as brutal, suspect, militaristic, or the biased efforts of "outsiders," citizens will be discouraged from taking active roles in community building activities and crime prevention initiatives in conjunction with the police. Perhaps this is why the communities that most need neighborhood watch programs are least likely to be populated by residents who take active roles in them.

Critics say that zero-tolerance policing fails because it destroys several important requisites for successful community policing: police accountability, openness to the public, and community cooperation (Cox and Wade 1998: 106).

Zero tolerance violates principles of health and human services and standards for the education and healthy growth of children, families and communities. Even traditional community service providers in the 1970s aimed for "services for all" (such as zero reject), instead of 100% societal exclusion (zero tolerance). Public administration and disability has supported principles that include education, employment, housing, transportation, recreation, and political participation in the community, which zero-tolerance groups claim are not a right in the US.

Opponents of zero tolerance believe that such a policy neglects investigation on a case-by-case basis and may lead to unreasonably harsh penalties for crimes that may not warrant such penalties in reality. Another criticism of zero-tolerance policies is that it gives officers and the legal system little discretion in dealing with offenders. Zero-tolerance policies may prohibit their enforcers from making the punishment fit the crime.

Fixed sentencing guidelines may incite offenders to commit more serious crimes because they know their punishment will be the same no matter the degree of their actions. That phenomenon of human nature is described in an adage that dates back to at least the 17th century, "might as well be hanged for a sheep as a lamb". Until 1820, the English law prescribed hanging for stealing anything worth more than one shilling, whether it was a low-value lamb or a whole flock of sheep.

In the kids for cash scandal, Judge Mark Ciavarella, who promoted a platform of zero tolerance, received kickbacks for constructing a private prison that housed juvenile offenders and then proceeded to fill the prison by sentencing children to extended stays in juvenile detention for offenses as minimal as mocking a principal on Myspace, scuffles in hallways, trespassing in a vacant building, and shoplifting DVDs from Walmart. Critics of zero-tolerance policies argue that harsh punishments for minor offences are normalized. The documentary Kids for Cash interviews experts on adolescent behaviour who argue that the zero-tolerance model has become a dominant approach to policing juvenile offences after the Columbine shooting.

Recently, argumentation theorists (especially Sheldon Wein) have suggested that, frequently, when people advocate adopting a zero-tolerance policy, they commit what he has called the "zero-tolerance fallacy". Subsequently, Wein has proposed standards which arguments for zero-tolerance policies must meet in order to avoid such fallacious inferences.

== See also ==
- Blue-collar crime
- Bob Kiley
- Brinkmanship
- Broken windows theory
- Crime mapping
- Crime prevention
- Deterrence (penology)
- Harm reduction
- Ignorantia juris non excusat
- International Day of Zero Tolerance for Female Genital Mutilation
- Kids for cash scandal
- Law and order (politics)
- Mandatory sentencing
- Nils Bejerot
- Ray Mallon
- Zero-defects mentality, a similar policy used in the military

== Bibliography ==
- Bowling, B. (1999) The rise and fall of New York murder: zero tolerance or crack's decline? vol. 39, no. 4 (1999): 531–54.
- Cox, S. & J. Wade. (1998). The Criminal Justice Network: An Introduction. New York: McGraw-Hill.
- Dennis, Norman; Erdos, George (2005) Cultures and Crimes, cap. 13 Dealing with Diversity: Libertarianism and Multiculturalism pp. 169–83 ISBN 1-903386-38-1
- Eck, John E.; Maguire, Edward R. (2000) Have Changes in Policing Reduced Violent Crime?, pp. 207–65 in The Crime Drop in America, edited by Alfred Blumstein and Joel Wallman. Cambridge University Press, New York, 2000.
- Fagan, Jeffrey; Franklin Zimring et June Kim, Declining Homicide in New York City : A Tale of Two Trends, Journal of Criminal Law and Criminology, 88–4, été 1998, pp. 1277–1324.
- Marshall, Jayne (1999) Zero Tolerance Policing . South Australia Office of Crime, Issue 9 March 1999.
- Robinson, M. (2002). Justice Blind? Ideals and Realities of American Criminal Justice. Upper Saddle River, NJ: Prentice-Hall.
- Rowe, Mary and Corinne Bendersky, "Workplace Justice, Zero Tolerance and Zero Barriers: Getting People to Come Forward in Conflict Management Systems," in Negotiations and Change, From the Workplace to Society, Thomas Kochan and Richard Locke (editors), Cornell University Press, 2002. (http://web.mit.edu/ombud/publications/index.html, # 18).
- Slade, Gavin, Alexei Trochev, and Malika Talgatova (2020) "The Limits of Authoritarian Modernisation: Zero Tolerance Policing in Kazakhstan," Europe-Asia Studies.
- Sherman, L., D.; Gottfredson, D; MacKenzie, J; Eck, P; Reuter & Bushway, S. (1997). "Preventing Crime: What Works, What Doesn't, What's Promising."
- Snider, Laureen. (2004) "Zero Tolerance Reversed: Constituting the Non-Culpable Subject in Walkerton" in What is a Crime? Defining Criminal Conduct in Contemporary Canadian Society. Vancouver: University of British Columbia Press, and Montreal: Laval University Press (French translation), 2004: 155–84.
- Tonello, Fabrizio (2007) Così negli Usa è fallita la Tolleranza zero [eng.: So Zero Tolerance failed in the US] published by il manifesto 31 August 2007, p. 5 (in Italian)
- Wacquant, Loïc (1999) Penal ’common sense’ comes to Europe - US exports zero tolerance April 1999 Le Monde Diplomatique. (original French version, ita version)
- ——— (November 1999), Prisons of Poverty.
- ——— (May 2002), "Sur quelques contes sécuritaires venus d'Amérique - Les impasses d'un modèle répressif", Le Monde diplomatique (in French), archived from the original on 22 July 2011.
- Wein, Sheldon (2014), Mohammed, Dima; Lewiński, Marcin (eds.), "Exploring the virtues (and vices) of zero tolerance arguments", Proceedings of the 2013 OSSA Conference, University of Windsor, Centre for Research on Reasoning, Argumentation, and Rhetoric (CRRAR) publishing.
- Wilson, James Q.; Kelling, George L. (March 1982). "Broken Windows: The police and neighborhood safety" (PDF). The Atlantic Monthly. Manhattan institute. *Broken windows, The Atlantic.
