= Institutional abuse =

Mistreatment of a person from a system of power

Institutional abuse is the maltreatment of a person (often children or older adults) from a system of power. This can range from acts similar to home-based child abuse, such as neglect, physical and sexual abuse, and hunger, to the effects of assistance programs working below acceptable service standards, or relying on harsh or unfair ways to modify behavior. Institutional abuse occurs within emergency care facilities such as foster homes, group homes, kinship care homes, and pre-adoptive homes. Children who are placed in this type of out of home care are typically in the custody of the state. The maltreatment is usually caused by an employee of the facility.

== Background ==
Institutional abuse can typically occur in a group home, nursing home, acute hospital or in-patient setting and can be any of the following:

- Discriminatory abuse
- Financial abuse
- Neglect
- Physical abuse
- Psychological and emotional abuse
- Sexual abuse
- Verbal abuse

Typical of the institutionalized bigotry that coincides with abuse, it is said that it can be considered to mainly apply to four categories of people:

- Children – see also child abuse
- Adults with learning difficulties
- Adults with mental health problems
- Older people – see also elder abuse.

This perspective often written into educational material seeks to excuse perpetrators with the "explanation" that the abused adults are all somehow mentally inept.

Institutional abuse can be divided into three categories:

- Overt abuse – similar to familial abuse in its overt physical, sexual, or emotional abuse by a foster parent or child care worker
- Program abuse – unique to an institutional situation, in which a program must operate below acceptable conditions or improperly use power to modify the behavior of person
- System abuse – involves an entire care system that is stretched beyond capacity and causes maltreatment through inadequate resources.

These issues range from personal abuses to situational maltreatment and differ greatly in their causes. Most institutional abuses are the result of difficult and stressful working environments, where those with the least training often have the most contact with the participants, and have the hardest schedules, least payment, and most undesirable working conditions. The high-stress working environments of care workers combined with low-quality hiring and screening practices of workers can create abusive situations through lack of experience or knowledge on the worker's part. Lack of proper training for workers can conflict or hurt institutional goals for patients through improper implementation of treatments, compounded by organizational structures that may only have doctors and psychologists on site for short hours. In overstressed situations, power over the patients can bring feelings of control and significance, leading to stress being a predictor of abuse in institutional and familial settings. Isolation from the community can have similar effects.

Often complicating worker issues is lack of organizational goals or policy. In childcare situations, lack of curricular recreation for children can lead to more acting out behavior, causing more stress for workers, and more inclination toward mistreatment. Patients can often be difficult to manage through inability or behavioral issues, and those who are more difficult for staff to work with are often the victims of abusive situations. It is proposed that most abuse rises of out frustration and lack of ability to properly control the patient, not intentional maltreatment. Institutional child abuse also happens intentionally in the troubled teen industry where residential treatment centers and schools market themselves as therapeutic to families who are then duped into colluding with the abuse. The outcomes of these types of abusive settings resemble cult like circumstances and are devastating to the survivor of abuse. More and more programs are getting shut down through a movement called "Breaking Code Silence" started by Paris Hilton in 2020 where she publicly spoke about her abuse at Provo Canyon School in Utah. The exposure led to a lot of changes in the industry. There is a lack of state legislation defining or prosecuting institutional abuse, leading to difficulty in investigation or dealing with abusive situations.

== Historical perspective ==
Institutional abuse is also present in situations outside those of child and elder care. The Nuremberg Code was developed during the Nuremberg Trials to create a universal ethical code for the treatment of humans from an institutional standpoint. Though this Code is not formally adopted by any organization, its standard for human rights has been used as a guide for more specific ethical codes. However, history has still shown the abuse of the vulnerable members of society through medical and psychiatric institutions. Under the Nazi regime of the early 1940s, this abuse took the form of sterilization of those purported to be "mentally ill", and general medical experimentation without consent or will to leave, and eugenics. The political nature of these policies lead to them being enforced by law under an ideology of purifying race of genetic deficiencies. Eugenics and sterilization campaigns have also been run outside of political dictatorship, including a number of states in the United States, Denmark, Finland, and Sweden. But it is the shift from sterilization to euthanasia of the mentally ill or other politically undesirable groups in Nazi Germany that lead to the actions of the Holocaust. Japanese soldiers of the time also would use these groups as research subjects for infectious diseases and poisons, while Stalin's regime in Russia used the guise of mental illness to torture and punish political dissidents.

The Army and CIA of the United States also have histories of testing psychiatric drugs on unwilling patients or soldiers. LSD was tested by using prostitutes to trick men into taking the drug, and various combinations of depressants, hallucinogens, and stimulants would be given to unconsenting soldiers for observation of the effects. In response to many of these unethical experiments, specific ethical codes were developed to protect the rights of the participants and require informed consent.

== Abuse of children ==
Abuse in childcare institutions falls most commonly into the categories of overt abuse, program abuse, and system abuse, which arise from the staff, program, or childcare system. As children are still in development as institutional abuse occurs, the definition of institutional abuse for children is often widened to include harming a child's development, altering a child's identity, or devaluing them as a person. Child maltreatment is also often defined as foreseeable or probable harm or injury to a child's physical, social, emotional, or developmental well-being. Researchers found incidents ranging from 39 to 85 abuse cases per 100 children living in full-time housing, with only 85 in 1000 cases being reported to authorities. Children in mental disorder clinics were more likely to report abuse than those in mental disability clinics.

=== Model of abuse ===
A number of researchers have tried to model the factors that cause abuse and maltreatment in childcare facilities. The acting factors in this model are the caregivers, children, the care-giving environment, and any other exogenic factors. Risk factors towards abuse are associated with each of these, such as the stress of the working environment can be to caregivers. These factors have all been organized into a model of concentric circles, with maltreatment at the center, and each circle further out influencing those within. There are ordered from inside out: maltreatment, child factors, caretaker factors, organization and environment factors, and exogenous factors.

==== Caretaker risk factors ====
A number of high-risk factors for the institutional abuse of children include lack of caretaker competence or training and adherence to only one treatment methodology, lack of supervision of caretakers, and much time for unstructured activities. The probability of a caretaker to be abusive is positively correlated with their job stress, age, lack of job satisfaction and facility status.

==== Child risk factors ====
Children who are more likely to be abused often display characteristics of being difficult for workers to deal with and needing more one-on-one supervision, isolation from their family, and previous victims of abuse. Children with disabilities or chronic illnesses are especially at risk of institutional abuse due to their reliance on healthcare institutions such as hospitals. Male children are more likely to be abused, and are more often abused physically and neglectfully, while females are more likely to be sexually abused.

==== Other factors ====
Incidents of abuse are most often reported at the beginning and end of the school year, and there are conflicting reports as to unemployment rates' influence on abuse.

== Abuse of older adults ==
There is not a definitive definition of institutional abuse of older adults, with psychologists differing with legal definitions, and differing depending on the measures used. Definitions often include institutionally caused physical, psychological, financial, or sexual abuse or neglect. Among the abuse that happens among elders, most is concentrated on those who are more frail and need more assistance. In a review of Canadian assistance homes, over 70% of workers reported acting in an abusive way towards patients, frequently in the form of psychological abuse or neglect. In a study of American assistance homes, there was a rate of 20% for employees stealing from residents, with employees acknowledging that it was the residents that were more difficult or abusive that were more likely to be robbed. Further, in Sweden, assistance home employees reported witnessing abuse at 11%, while participating in elder abuse at 2% rates. This abuse was most commonly physical abuse, followed by psychological abuse and neglect. Rates of abuse differ across surveys, countries, and homes, but certain facts are consistent across studies. Victims of abuse are also susceptible to threefold greater mortality rates than their peers.

Several frameworks have been developed to model the risk factors for institutional elder abuse. In one model, risk factors are divided into three categories: validated factors, possible factors, and contested factors. Factors that have been shown to be risks for abuse include lack of consistent organizational policies, low-quality enforcement of standards, lack of trained staff, vulnerability due to dementia. Possible factors include gender, personality of the victim, and race.

Sexual abuse is one of the lower occurring and under-reported forms of institutional abuse. Women are disproportionately represented among victims, and most often abused by other residents of the home. The majority of victims also suffered from a form of dementia or cognitive impairment. However, institution-based sexual abuse crossed all gender, race, and cultural barriers.

Risk factors of institutional abuse of older adults has been found to be related to the size of the housing, with larger organizations more susceptible to abuse. Staff factors such as unionization, short staffing, and work stress are also predictors of abuse. Patients with severe dementia are also more susceptible to maltreatment such as being constrained.

Researchers do not have a definitive answer for the cause of elder abuse. Workers in assistance homes have suggested that program factors such as understaffing, focus on making money over human welfare, and ageism contributing to institutional abuse, aggravated by patients who may be difficult or struggling with mental health issues. Most studies have focused on the interaction of stressed workers with difficult patients.

Studies indicate that social inclusion can act as a cessation towards elderly abuse. This method is not only intended to encourage diversity within hospital settings. It is also intended to ensure the individual needs of elderly patients are being met. Other intervention methods that are education based have high success rates in increasing awareness but less evidence of improving the welfares of elderly populations.

== Canada ==
In Canada, institutional abuse covers topics such as residential schools, psychiatric and developmental institutions, juvenile detention centres, and abuses in church. Investigations and inquiries have highlighted patterns of physical, sexual, and psychological abuse.

== Notable institutions and investigations ==
- Jimmy Savile sexual abuse scandal, concerning a British celebrity who is claimed to have targeted institutions
- Nova Scotia Youth Centre

Youth Facilities

- Cal Farley's Boys Ranch
- List of youth detention center incidents in Ontario
- Florida School for Boys
- Forgotten Australians
- Haut de la Garenne
- Home Children
- PA Child Care (Kids for cash scandal)
- North Wales child abuse scandal
- Northern Ireland Historical Institutional Abuse Inquiry
- Rutherford County, Tennessee juvenile arrest and incarceration scandal

Care Homes

- Orchid View

Hospitals

- Bethlem Royal Hospital
- Bloomingdale Insane Asylum
- Ely Hospital
- Letchworth Village
- Stafford Hospital scandal
- Tiergartenstraße 4
- Willowbrook State School
- Winterbourne View hospital abuse
- Élan School
- Provo Canyon School

Other

- Judge Rotenberg Center

== See also ==
- Abuse
- Abuse of power
- Abusive power and control
- Disability abuse
- Foster care
- Institution
- Institutional betrayal
- Institutional racism
- Institutional violence
- Life course theory
- Vicarious liability
- Vulnerable adult
