= Law Center =

Law Center can refer to:

== Advocacy organizations ==
- Southern Poverty Law Center
- Giffords Law Center to Prevent Gun Violence
- National Consumer Law Center
- Software Freedom Law Center

== Schools ==
- Georgetown University Law Center
- Touro Law Center
- University of Houston Law Center
- Franklin Pierce Law Center, now known as University of New Hampshire School of Law
- Southern University Law Center
- Faculty of Law, University of Delhi

== Law firms ==
- Thomas More Law Center
- Juvenile Law Center
