= Marsha Levick =

American juvenile justice lawyer

Marsha Levick is a lawyer from Philadelphia, Pennsylvania, United States. She is a co-founder and chief legal officer of the Juvenile Law Center and expert in juvenile justice.

== Career ==
Marsha Levick finished the Friends Select School, Pennsylvania, and graduated from the University of Pennsylvania and Temple University Beasley School of Law.

She and three other Temple law graduates founded the Juvenile Law Center in 1975.

She had led the Juvenile Law Center litigation before the Pennsylvania Supreme Court related to the kids for cash scandal in Luzerne County, Pennsylvania.

She co-authored child advocates' amicus briefs for a number of cases before the Supreme Court: Roper v. Simmons, Graham v. Florida, J. D. B. v. North Carolina, and Miller v. Alabama and served as a co-counsel in Montgomery v. Louisiana.

She is an adjunct professor at the University of Pennsylvania Law School and Temple University Beasley School of Law.

== Personal life ==
Her father was an oncologist and her mother was a psychologist who founded the first graduate-level art therapy program in the country at Hahnemann University Hospital.

Levick is married to Tom Innis, a Philadelphia public defender. She has two daughters from a previous marriage.

== Notable cases ==
- Pennsylvania Kids for cash scandal: Levick represented juveniles in two of several class action suits.

== Awards ==
- 2015: The Philadelphia Award; Quotation: "Mrs Levick's career-long commitment to advancing and safeguarding the rights of Philadelphia's youth has changed the face of juvenile justice not just in Philadelphia, but across the nation"
- Awards from professional associations:
  - Temple University’s Women's Law Caucus Professional Achievement Award (2006)
  - Pennsylvania Bar Association Child Advocate of the Year Award (2008)
  - Foundation for the Improvement of Justice Award (2009)
  - Pennsylvania Prison Society Award for Meritorious Service (2009)
  - Philadelphia Bar Association's Andrew Hamilton Award (2009)
  - American Association for Justice Leonard Weinglass Award (2010)
  - American Bar Association Livingston Hall Award (2010)
  - Rutgers-Camden Black Law Student Association Champion of Justice Award (2010)
  - Clifford Scott Green Bill of Rights Award, Federal Bar Association, Philadelphia Criminal Justice Section (2010) (co-recipient)
  - Philadelphia Bar Association, Criminal Justice Section Thurgood Marshall Award (2011) (Co-recipient)
- Other awards:
  - Philadelphia Inquirer Citizen of the Year (2009) (co-recipient)
  - The Legal Intelligencer, Women of Distinction (2010)
  - Good Shepherd Mediation Program Shepherd of Peace Award (2010)
  - Friends Select School, Distinguished Alumnae Award (2011)
  - Arlen Specter Award, The Legal Intelligencer (2013)
  - American Academy of Child and Adolescent Psychiatry (AACAP) Catcher in the Rye Award (2017)
