= PA Child Care =

Juvenile detention center

Coordinates: 41.17127°N 79.74898°W

PA Child Care was a juvenile detention center in Pittston Township, Pennsylvania. It was opened in February 2003. It has a sister company, Western PA Child Care, in Butler County, Pennsylvania. Treatment at both facilities is provided by Mid Atlantic Youth Services, and both were involved in the kids for cash scandal in 2008. Gregory Zappala took sole ownership of the company when he purchased co-owner Robert Powell's share in June 2008. The facility closed in November 2020.

== Western PA Child Care ==
PA Child Care's sister facility, Western PA Child Care, houses 99 beds in Allegheny Township, Butler County. It was opened in 2005. The company has been criticized for its costs, which ranged as high as $315 per child per day. Butler County paid Western PA Child Care about $800,000 in payments between 2005 and 2008. Butler County did not renew Western PA Child Care's contract after an extension of the contract ran out at the end of 2008.

== Building lease controversy ==
Robert Powell, an attorney and co-owner of PA Child Care, was involved with the leasing of the PA Child Care building as he was also the county planning commission solicitor. County minority commissioner Stephen Urban complained that Powell should have fully disclosed his involvement with PA Child Care because of this conflict of interest. Powell ignored the subsequent and repeated written and verbal notices from county officials to file financial disclosure forms as required by the state ethics commission covering his years of solicitorship employment with the county. As of 2009 Powell had still not filed the forms. Powell was only discovered to be involved with PA Child Care in April 2002, nine months after the lease proposal had been sent.

== Kids for cash scandal ==
PA Child Care is infamous for its involvement in the kids for cash scandal. Judges Michael Conahan and Mark Ciavarella pleaded guilty to receiving $2.6 million in payments from PA Child Care in return for contracting with the facilities and imposing harsh sentences on juvenile offenders in order to ensure that the detention centers would be utilized.

In July 2009, Robert Powell pleaded guilty to failing to report a felony and being an accessory to tax evasion conspiracy in connection with $770,000 in kickbacks he paid to Ciavarella and Conahan in exchange for facilitating the development of his facilities. In November 2011, he was sentenced to 18 months in prison.

Gregory Zappala was not accused of any wrongdoing in the scandal; Zappala's brother, Stephen Zappala Jr., is the Allegheny County District Attorney.

The scandal is featured in Michael Moore's 2009 documentary, Capitalism: A Love Story, on the CNBC program American Greed, and in the 2014 documentary Kids for Cash.
