= Kids for Cash =

2013 documentary film on judicial scandal

- Directed by: Robert May
- Produced by: Lauren Timmons; Robert May; Poppy Das
- Cinematography: Jay Gillespie; Ed Marritz
- Edited by: Poppy Das
- Music by: Michael Brook
- Production company: SenArt Films
- Release dates: 17 November 2013 (DOC NYC); February 2014
- Running time: 102 minutes
- Country: United States
- Language: English
- Box office: $143,178

Kids for Cash is a 2013 documentary film about the "kids for cash" scandal which unfolded in 2008 over judicial kickbacks in Wilkes-Barre, Pennsylvania. Two judges were found guilty of accepting kickbacks in exchange for sending thousands of juveniles to detention centers when probation or a lesser penalty would have been appropriate. Some juveniles were sent to detention centers for incidents as minor as theft of a CD from Walmart.

== Plot ==
In the film, former judge Michael Conahan admits to his crime and accepts the plea agreement. On September 23, 2011, he was sentenced to 17.5 years in prison and ordered to pay 874,000 dollars in restitution. Unlike Conahan, former judge Mark Ciavarella did not accept a plea agreement and completely denied allegations of his involvement in the kids-for-cash scam. He and his family went as far as accusing Conahan of lying about the scam. They claimed Ciavarella was being falsely accused of a crime he did not commit. As a result, he was sentenced to 28 years in prison, 10.5 more years than Conahan. Had he admitted to his crimes, Ciavarella may have had a lesser sentence similar to that of Conahan.

The documentary points directly to Conahan’s involvement in the scam and how he was involved in several business endeavors that gave him the experience necessary to orchestrate the scam. Conahan signed a plea agreement admitting to financial kickbacks from the scam. Ciavarella was found guilty of twelve of thirty-nine federal felonies including racketeering, mail fraud, money laundering, fraud conspiracy and filing false tax returns.

After beginning his sentence at a Federal correctional institution in Pekin, Illinois, Ciavarella was transferred in October 2014 to a Federal transfer center in Oklahoma City, Oklahoma. In March 2015, the Supreme Court of the United States rejected Ciavarella’s petition for an appeal of his conviction. He will be 85 years old when he is eligible for release. Several sources have published that former judge Conahan demanded $129,000 from former judge Ciavarella's in-laws, but more reputable sources have yet to confirm this allegation.

== Production ==
Interviewees include Mark Ciavarella, Michael Conahan, Justin Bodnar, Hillary Transue, Amanda Lorah, Sandy Fonzo, Charlie Balasavage, and Terrie Morgan-Besecker.

== Reception ==
On Rotten Tomatoes, the film an approval rating of 92% based on 36 reviews. On Metacritic the film has a score of 75% based on reviews from 17 critics, indicating "generally favorable" reviews.

Ronnie Scheib of Variety wrote: "The film represents a scathing critique of America’s juvenile justice system, the privatization of penal institutions, and the whole notion of "zero tolerance."" Frank Scheck of The Hollywood Reporter called it "A real-life thriller that rivals the most dramatic fiction in terms of emotional impact."

== See also ==
- Incarceration in the United States
- Private prison
