= Judith Chomsky =

American human rights lawyer (born 1942)

Judith Brown Chomsky
- Born: 1942 (age 83–84); Philadelphia, Pennsylvania, US
- Occupation: Human rights lawyer
- Spouse: David Chomsky (1960-2021, his death)
- Relatives: Noam Chomsky (brother-in-law)

Judith Brown Chomsky (born 1942 in Philadelphia, Pennsylvania) is an American human rights lawyer. She is the sister-in-law of MIT linguistics professor Noam Chomsky.

== Early life ==
Chomsky wed David Chomsky (1934–2021), younger brother of Noam Chomsky, in 1960; they were married for over 60 years, until his death in July 2021. The couple had two sons.

Chomsky became involved with politics when she participated in demonstrations in the 1950s for the right of African-Americans to use non-segregated lunch counters. Chomsky was a graduate student in anthropology when she joined a project to organize grassroots opposition to the Vietnam War. She left graduate school and spent the next several years as an organizer with the Philadelphia Resistance, primarily with anti war GIs (active duty in the military) and with Vietnam veterans. As the US participation in the war wound down, Chomsky decided that her family circumstances as a mother of two did not permit her to work as an organizer. She decided to go to law school so that she could participate in the same struggles with new skills better suited to her personal life.

== Career ==
In 1975, following her graduation from Temple Law School, she became a co-founder with three law school friends of the Juvenile Law Center of Philadelphia. After a few years, she had the opportunity to represent migrant farm laborers and to begin the Workers Rights Law Project to serve workers who were trying to organize within their labor organization to create more democratic and active unions. She was contacted by the Center for Constitutional Rights (CCR), which was looking for a lawyer who could go to Gaza and the Occupied West Bank to help prepare a case involving civilian deaths from the Israeli occupation. This began her current work life as a cooperating attorney with the CCR, where she works on cases in their international human rights docket.

On July 19, 2008, Chomsky filed a status report on Civil Action No. 05-CV-1645 on behalf of Hussein Salem Mohammed. According to Chomsky a petition for habeas corpus was filed on August 16, 2005. In response the United States Department of Justice filed a redacted and incomplete factual return on June 5, 2006. Additionally, on 26 April 2007, a DTA appeal under the Detainee Treatment Act of 2005—Almerfedi v. Gates (Civil Action No. 07-cv-1132).

Chomsky served as an election observer in the 1994 election in South Africa and in the 1984 election in El Salvador.

On June 13, 2007, she represented Colombian families in a federal class action lawsuit against Chiquita Brands International (Doe v. Chiquita Brands International), a producer and distributor of bananas based in Cincinnati, Ohio for funding and arming known terrorist organizations (designated by the United States Secretary of State) in Colombia to maintain its profits.

On November 26, 2008, Chomsky filed a "Petitioner's opposition to the government's motion for clarification and reconsideration of this court's November 6, 2008 case management order and supplemental amended order with regard to Waleed Said Bn Said Zaid (ISN 550) in Civil Action No. 05-CV-1646 (JDB)."

On July 19, 2008, Chomsky filed a status report on behalf of Waleed Said Bin Said Zaid. In her report Chomsky stated his petition was first filed on August 16, 2005. She reported that the United States Department of Justice filed an incomplete and redacted factual return February 22, 2006. She reported that a DTA appeal under the Detainee Treatment Act of 2005 had been filed, Zaid v. Gates (Civil Action No. 07-1131) on 26 April 2007.

She was one of the lawyers from the Center for Constitutional Rights who represented the Saro-Wiwa family in their lawsuit against Royal Dutch Shell. On June 9, 2009, Shell settled out-of-court with the Saro-Wiwa family and nine other plaintiffs, for a total of $15.5 million, which included a sum towards a trust benefitting the Ogoni people, though claiming it was only a gesture of sympathy and still denying culpability in his death and the deaths of the other so-called Ogoni Nine.
