= Córdoba State Highway Patrol =

Córdoba State Highway Patrol Policía Caminera de la Provincia de Córdoba
- Motto: "To respect the rules is to respect the life"

Agency overview
- Formed: 2009; 17 years ago
- Employees: 5000 (as of 2017)

Jurisdictional structure
- Governing body: Córdoba State, Argentina
- General nature: Civilian police

Operational structure
- Headquarters: Córdoba, Argentina
- Agency executive: Comisario Julio César Suárez, Chief of Police

Facilities
- Stations: 12

Website
- Official website

The Córdoba State Highway Patrol (Spanish: Policia Caminera de la Provincia de Cordoba) is an arm of the Córdoba Provincial Police that oversees Córdoban roads and highways. Governor Juan Schiaretti set up the force to reduce traffic accident deaths, one of the largest causes of death in Argentina.

In addition to their traffic security and security enforcement in roadways, the Patrol is authorized to act as normal police officers in any situation that requires them to do so.

Their tasks includes setting up alcohol and license/registration checkpoints, enforce traffic laws and speed limits, and provide general help to anyone on the road. The state patrol sets up several controls around the state. They enforce the zero-tolerance policy for driving under the influence of alcohol or drugs, and use breathalyzers to enforce these policies. The vehicles used by the State Highway Patrol are different than the ones that serve at the State Police. Some of the models that they employ are the Chevrolet Corsa (decommissioned as of 2017) and the Fiat Siena for patrol duty, the Renault Fluence and Peugeot 407 for responding or high-speed chases, and the Fiat Toro for rough terrains.
