= Doe v. Chiquita Brands International =

Lawsuit in United States district court

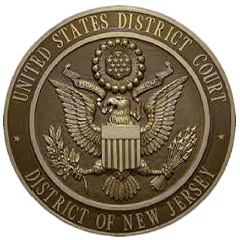
- Court: United States District Court for the District of New Jersey
- Full case name: John Doe 1, et al. v. Chiquita Brands International, Inc., et al.
- Docket nos.: 2:07-cv-03406

Court membership
- Judge sitting: John Michael Vazquez

Doe v. Chiquita Brands International is a class-action lawsuit brought in the United States District Court of New Jersey, filed on June 13, 2007. The suit was filed by Colombian families represented by EarthRights International (ERI), together with the Colombian Institute of International Law (CIIL), and Judith Brown Chomsky, against the Cincinnati-based producer and distributor of Chiquita Brands International. The suit alleges that Chiquita funded and armed known terrorist organizations (as designated by the United States Secretary of State) in Colombia.

The 144 plaintiffs allege that terrorists funded by Chiquita Brands killed 173 individuals of whom the plaintiffs were legal representatives. The killings took place over a lengthy period of time from 1975 to 2004 and most occurred in the 1990s and 2000s.

Chiquita Brands has admitted in federal court that a subsidiary company (which was subsequently sold) paid Colombian terrorists to protect employees at its most profitable banana-growing operation. As part of a deal with prosecutors, the company pleaded guilty to one count of doing business with a terrorist organization. In exchange, the company will pay a $25-million fine and court documents will not reveal the identities of the group of senior executives who approved the illegal protection payments.

On June 10, 2024, Chiquita Brands International was found liable by a jury in United States Federal Court of financing the far-right paramilitary death squad United Self-Defense Forces of Colombia in the Antioquia and Magdalena Departments of Colombia.

== History ==
EarthRights International first filed the case John Doe 1 v. Chiquita Brands International, Inc. in 2007 in the United States District Court, Court of New Jersey.

== See also ==
- Chiquita#Payments to terrorist groups
- United Fruit Company
