= Rolf Larsen =

American judge

Justice of the Supreme Court of Pennsylvania
- In office January 5, 1978 – October 4, 1994

Personal details
- Born: August 26, 1934 Pittsburgh, Pennsylvania
- Died: August 11, 2014 (aged 79) Pittsburgh, Pennsylvania
- Party: Democratic

Rolf Larsen (August 26, 1934 – August 11, 2014) was an American jurist who served as a justice on the Supreme Court of Pennsylvania. A Democrat originally from Allegheny County, he was first elected to the Supreme Court of Pennsylvania in 1978. In 1994, he became the first and only Pennsylvania Supreme Court justice to be removed from office by impeachment.

== Early life and career ==
Born in Pittsburgh, Pennsylvania, Larsen went to Pennsylvania State University, University of Pittsburgh, Duquesne University, Santa Clara University School of Law, and then received his law degree from Penn State University, Dickinson School of Law. In 1974, he was elected judge of the Allegheny County, Pennsylvania Court of Common Pleas, a trial level court. He received notoriety as a trial judge after sentencing fathers to jail for failure to pay child support. Following that Larsen was elected to the Pennsylvania Supreme Court in 1977.

== Pennsylvania Supreme Court ==
He was sworn into office on January 5, 1978. In 1986, he received the Justice Musmanno Award from the Philadelphia Trial Lawyers Association. During his time as a supreme court justice he was described as simultaneously highly intelligent and irrational.

=== Impeachment and removal from office ===
In 1981, a public feud between Larsen and Justice Robert N. C. Nix, Jr. took on racial undertones when newspapers reported that Larsen allegedly threatened to publicize the fact that Nix was black in an attempt to defeat him for retention. Larsen was investigated and exonerated by a judicial board of inquiry, however, the disputes between the justices continued.

In 1992, Larsen was accused of improperly communicating with a trial judge about a case. Larsen in turn filed court documents accusing Nix and other Justices of the Supreme Court of similar conduct. Upon hearing those allegations, the Pennsylvania Attorney General convened a grand jury to investigate the situation.

The grand jury found no evidence of improper communications among members of the court, but did find evidence that Justice Larsen was involved in a conspiracy to fraudulently obtain prescription drugs. Larsen, who had been prescribed drugs for clinical anxiety and depression since the 1960s, arranged for his doctor to write prescriptions to court employees because he had wanted to keep his treatment a secret while holding public office. He was charged with several offenses related to this matter in October 1993.

In April 1994, a jury found Larsen guilty of two counts of criminal conspiracy. Two months later the trial court sentenced Justice Larsen to one year of probation for each count and removed him from office for the "infamous" crime of which he was convicted.

While Larsen appealed the sentencing order, the Pennsylvania General Assembly proceeded with impeachment and removal proceedings. The Pennsylvania House of Representatives impeached Larsen on seven charges, some relating to the crime and another relating to improper communication with a trial judge about a case. On October 4, 1994, in his impeachment trial, the Pennsylvania Senate convicted Larsen of improper communication, removed him from office, and prohibited him from holding any office of public trust in the future. He is the only Pennsylvania Supreme Court justice to be removed by the Pennsylvania Senate in an impeachment process. His impeachment has been described as the most prominent impeachment of a state supreme court justice in U.S. history.

=== Aftermath ===
Amid these troubles and feuds involving Supreme Court justices in the early 1990s, specifically including Larsen, Pennsylvania voters sought to limit the "King's Bench" power. The public image of Justice Larsen made him a poster child for the need for court reform. The upheaval surrounding Larsen's time on the bench served as a catalyst for a much-needed change in the state judicial system. Pennsylvanians for Modern Courts credits the public turmoil he caused with leading to the overwhelming passage of a constitutional amendment that strengthened the way judges are disciplined for misconduct. In 1993, Pennsylvania voters amended the State Constitution. The change created a due process system for judges through a state Judicial Conduct Board, which independently investigates misconduct complaints, and a Court of Judicial Discipline, which independently determines a Pennsylvania judge's innocence or guilt.

=== Notable opinions ===
- Pugh v. Holmes, 486 Pa. 272, 405 A.2d 897 (Pa. 1979) - abandoned the doctrine of "Caveat Emptor", and held that residential leases contain an implied warranty of habitability.
- In 1991, he authored the legal opinion upholding the death penalty for Gary Heidnick.

== Death ==
On August 11, 2014, Larsen died of lung cancer in Pittsburgh, Pennsylvania, at the age of 79, just fifteen days shy of what would have been his 80th birthday.
