= Private prison =

Prisons outsourced by governments

A private prison, or for-profit prison, is a place where people are imprisoned by a third party that is contracted by a government agency. Private prison companies typically enter into contractual agreements with governments that commit prisoners and then pay a per diem or monthly rate, either for each prisoner in the facility, or for each place available, whether occupied or not. Such contracts may be for the operation only of a facility, or for design, construction and operation. Such companies have expanded into halfway houses, probation, parole and sentencing services.

== Global spread ==
In 2013, countries that were currently using private prisons or in the process of implementing such plans included Brazil, Chile, Jamaica, Japan, Mexico, Peru, South Africa, Philippines, and South Korea. However, at the time, the sector was still dominated by the United States, United Kingdom, Australia and New Zealand.

== Australia ==
Australia opened its first private prison, Borallon Correctional Centre, in 1990.

In 2018, 18.4% of prisoners in Australia were held in private prisons.

=== Arguments for and against ===
A 2016 article by Anastasia Glushko (a former worker in the private prison sector) argues in favor of privately owned prisons in Australia. According to Glushko, private prisons in Australia have decreased the costs of holding prisoners and increased positive relationships between inmates and correctional workers. Outsourcing prison services to private companies has allowed for costs to be cut in half. Compared with $270 a day in a government-run West Australian jail, each prisoner in the privately operated Acacia Prison near Perth costs the taxpayer $182. Glushko also says positive prisoner treatment was observed during privatisation in Australia by including more respectful attitudes to prisoners and mentoring schemes, increased out-of-cell time and more purposeful activities.

However, a 2016 report from the University of Sydney found that in general, all states of Australia lacked a comprehensive approach to hold private prisons accountable to the government. The authors said that of all the states, Western Australia had the "most developed regulatory approach" to private prison accountability, as they had learnt from the examples in Queensland and Victoria. Western Australia provided much information about the running of private prisons in the state to the public, making it easier to assess performance. However the authors note that in spite of this, overall it is difficult to compare the performance and costs of private and public prisons as they often house different kinds and numbers of prisoners, in different states with different regulations. They note that Acacia Prison, sometimes held up as an example of how private prisons can be well run, cannot serve as a general example of prison privatisation.

Some research in regard to private prisons also indicates that there is an increase in heat related mortality, suggesting a possible link between heat exposure and maintenance with heat related prisoner death. This has been examined in the lens of methods of cost-cutting, which could potentially effect private prisons abilities to provide a proper climate control system for inmates. Some academics argue that private prisons, due to their budget per inmate, are less incentivized to provide air-conditioning in areas with extreme heat. Therefore, it is suggested that inmates in private prisons can be more at risk during heatwaves. This has sparked concern from human rights organizations and inmate advocacy groups.

=== Private immigration prisons ===
Several Australian immigration prisons are privately operated, including the Nauru Regional Processing Centre which is located on the pacific island country of Nauru and operated by Broadspectrum on behalf of the Australian Government, with security sub-contracted to Wilson Security. Immigration prisons typically hold people who have overstayed or lack a visa, or otherwise broken the terms of their visas. Some, such as the facility on Nauru, hold asylum seekers, refugees and even young children who can be detained indefinitely. In many cases people have been detained for years without charge or trial. This, as well as poor conditions, neglect, harsh treatment and deaths in some of the centers, has been the source of controversy in Australia and internationally.

== Canada ==
There have been three notable private detention facilities in Canada to date, and all have either gone defunct or reverted to government control.

The only private adult prison in Canada was the maximum-security Central North Correctional Centre in Penetanguishene, Ontario, operated by the U.S.-based Management and Training Corporation from its opening in 2001 through the end of its first contract period in 2006. The contract was held by the Ontario provincial Ministry of Community Safety and Correctional Services. A government comparison between the Central North "super-jail" and a nearly identical facility found that the publicly run prison had measurably better outcomes.

Two youth detention centres in Canada were operated by private companies, both at the provincial level. The Encourage Youth Corporation operated Project Turnaround in Hillsdale, Ontario under contract from the Government of Ontario from 1997 to 2004, after which the facility was shut down. In New Brunswick, the multinational private prison firm GEO Group constructed and operated the Miramichi Youth Detention Centre under contract with the province's Department of Public Safety before its contract was ended in the 1990s following public protests.

As of mid-2012, private prison companies continued to lobby the Correctional Service of Canada for contract business.

== France ==
The involvement of the private sector in prisons in France grew significantly between 1987 and the late 2000s, as reported by French scholar Fabrice Guilbaud. France's system is semi-private: so-called non-sovereign missions (kitchen, laundry, maintenance) are delegated to private companies, while guard and security functions are left to the State. Organization of inmate labor in prison workshops is another task that has been delegated to prison management companies. There are however no prisons in France in which every aspect of the prison is run by the private sector, as in the UK. The French approach to privatisation therefore necessarily divorces security and production functions. Prison is a space of forced confinement where the overriding concern is security. The fact is that at several levels, and depending on the type of prison (high security or not), production logic clashes with security logic. Structural limitations of production in a prison can restrict private companies' profit-taking capacities. A field study conducted by Guilbaud in 2004 and 2005 in five prisons chosen by prison and management type shows that the intensity of the tension between production and security, and the various ways in which this tension arises and is handled, vary by type of prison (short-stay, for convicts awaiting sentencing, or relatively long-stay for sentence-serving inmates) and type of management. The production/security tension seems better integrated in public-sector prisons than in those managed by the private sector in the sense that it produces fewer conflicts in them. This result runs counter to the widespread understanding that shaped the 1987 reform, the idea that introducing private enterprise and the professionalism associated with it into prisons would improve inmate employment and prison operation.

== Israel ==
=== Initial attempt ===
In 2004, the Israeli Knesset passed a law permitting the establishment of private prisons in Israel. The Israeli government's motivation was to save money by transferring prisoners to facilities managed by a private firm. The state would pay the franchisee $50 per day for inmate, sparing itself the cost of building new prisons and expanding the staff of the Israel Prison Service. In 2005, the Human Rights Department of the Academic College of Law in Ramat Gan filed a petition with the Israeli Supreme Court challenging the law. The petition relied on two arguments; first, it said transferring prison powers to private hands would violate the prisoners' fundamental human rights to liberty and dignity. Secondly, a private organization always aims to maximize profit, and would therefore seek to cut costs by, such means as skimping on prison facilities and paying its guards poorly, thus further undermining the prisoners' rights. As the case awaited decision, the first prison was built by the concessionaire, Lev Leviev's Africa Israel Investments, a facility near Beersheba designed to accommodate 2,000 inmates.

=== Israeli Supreme Court rejection ===
In November 2009, an expanded panel of 9 judges of the Israeli Supreme Court ruled that privately run prisons are illegal, and that for the State to transfer authority for managing the prison to a private contractor whose aim is monetary profit would severely violate the prisoners' basic human rights to dignity and freedom.

Supreme Court President Dorit Beinisch wrote: "Israel's basic legal principles hold that the right to use force in general, and the right to enforce criminal law by putting people behind bars in particular, is one of the most fundamental and one of the most invasive powers in the state's jurisdiction. Thus when the power to incarcerate is transferred to a private corporation whose purpose is making money, the act of depriving a person of [their] liberty loses much of its legitimacy. Because of this loss of legitimacy, the violation of the prisoner's right to liberty goes beyond the violation entailed in the incarceration itself."

== New Zealand ==
The use of private prisons in New Zealand has been tried, stopped and reintroduced. New Zealand's first privately run prison, the Auckland Central Remand Prison, also known as Mt. Eden Prison, opened under contract to Australasian Correctional Management (ACM) in 2000. In 2004, the Labour Government, opposed to privatisation, amended the law to prohibit the extension of private prison contracts. A year later, the 5-year contract with ACM was not renewed. In 2010, the National Government again introduced private prisons and international conglomerate Serco was awarded the contract to run the Mt Eden Prison.

On 16 July 2015, footage of "fight clubs" within the prison emerged online and was reported by TVNZ. Serco was heavily criticized for not investigating until after the footage was screened. On 24 July 2015, Serco's contract to run the Mount Eden prison was revoked due to numerous scandals and operation was given back to the New Zealand Department of Corrections. Serco was ordered to pay $8 million to the New Zealand government as a result of problems at Mount Eden Prison while it was under Serco's management.

Serco has also been given the contract to build and manage a 960-bed prison at Wiri. The contract with Serco provides for stiff financial penalties if its rehabilitation programmes fail to reduce re-offending by 10% more than the Corrections Department programmes. The prison is estimated to cost nearly NZ$400 million. In response, Charles Chauvel, the Labour Party's spokesperson for justice, and the Public Service Association both questioned the need for a new private prison when there were 1,200 empty beds in the prison system. In March 2012, Corrections Minister Anne Tolley announced that the new Wiri prison would enable older prisons such as Mt Crawford in Wellington and the New Plymouth prison to be closed. Older units at Arohata, Rolleston, Tongariro/Rangipo and Waikeria prisons will also be shut down.

The Auckland South Corrections Facility was opened on 8 May 2015. The contract to operate the prison ends in 2040. As of 2016, 10% of prisoners in New Zealand were housed in private prisons.

== South Korea ==
Somang Correctional Institution in Yeoju, Gyeonggi Province, is the only private prison for adult inmates in South Korea. The correctional institution was set up with an investment of 30 billion won (US$27 million) from the Christian Agape Foundation and opened on 1 December 2010. It is capable of accommodating up to 400 prisoners with convictions for violent crimes, but inmates at the prison usually serve sentences of less than seven years or have less than a year remaining on longer terms.

== United Kingdom ==
=== Number of prisoners ===
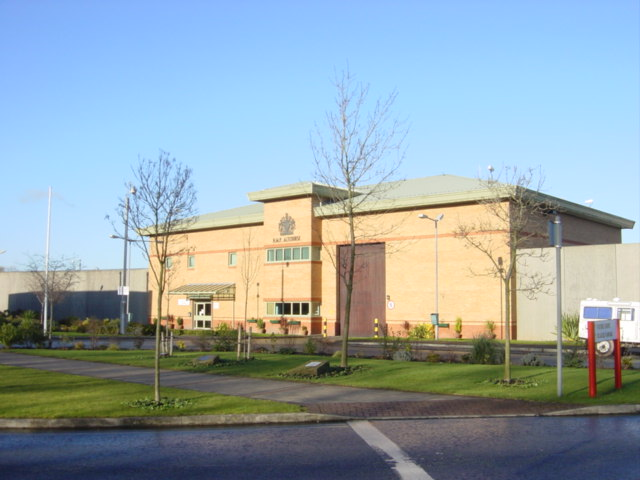
Private prison known as HMP Altcourse that opened in the UK in 1997

- In 2018, 18.46% of prisoners in England and Wales were housed in private prisons.
- 15.3% of prisoners in Scotland were housed in private prisons.

=== Development ===
The privatization of prisons can be traced to the contracting out of confinement and care of prisoners after the American Revolution. Deprived of the ability to ship criminals and undesirables to the Colonies, Great Britain began placing them on hulks (used as prison ships) moored in English ports.

In the modern era, the United Kingdom was the first European country to use for-profit prisons. Wolds Prison opened as the first privately managed prison in the UK in 1992. This was enabled by the passage of the Criminal Justice Act 1991 which empowered the Home Secretary to contract out prison services to the private sector.

In addition, a number of the UK's Immigration Removal Centres are privately operated, including the Harmondsworth Immigration Removal Centre, Yarl's Wood Immigration Removal Centre, and Colnbrook Immigration Removal Centre.

In 2007 the new Scottish National Party Government in Scotland announced that it was opposed to privately run prisons and would not let any more contracts. Since then, new prisons in Scotland have been built and run by the public sector. The last contract let in England and Wales was for HM Prison Northumberland, which transferred from the public sector to Sodexo in 2013. The most recent new prison to be built in England and Wales, HM Prison Berwyn near Wrexham, was given to the public sector to operate without any competition when it opened in 2017. Since 2017, it has been Labour Party policy not to commission any new private prisons in England and Wales.

On 5 November 2018, the prisons minister, Rory Stewart, told the House of Commons that two new prisons at Wellingborough, Northants, and Glen Parva, Leicestershire, would be built using conventional public finance, but their operation would be contracted out. On 29 November, he announced a framework competition, under which private operators would seek to be placed on a list of companies which would be eligible to bid in future competitions, including the planned programme for 10,000 new places to replace old prisons, and also for prisons currently operated privately, when those contracts end. It was implied that the public sector would be excluded from all such competitions. He said: "This Government remains committed to a role for the private sector in operating custodial services. The competition launched today will seek to build on the innovation and different ways of working that the private sector has previously introduced to the system. The sector has an important role to play, and currently runs some high-performing prisons, as part of a decent and secure prison estate.....A balanced approach to custodial services provision, which includes a mix of public, voluntary and private sector involvement has been shown to introduce improvements and deliver value for money for taxpayers."

The Secretary of State for Justice announced on 9 July 2019 that 6 companies had been accepted on to the Prison Operators Service Framework: G4S Care and Custody Services UK Limited, Interserve Investments Limited, Management and Training Corporation Works Limited, Mitie Care & Custody, Serco Limited, and Sodexo Limited. Of the two new contenders, Interserve had operated offender services in the community as part of the Purple Futures consortium: the Chief Inspector of Probation had rated 4 out of their 5 operations as 'requiring improvement'. The other, MTC, has run prisons in the USA, several of which have been the subject of serious failures and scandals.

The Secretary of State added: "The Government is committed to a mixed market of custodial services. The Prison Operator Framework will increase the diversity and resilience of the custodial services market in England and Wales, by creating a pool of prison operators who can provide high quality, value for money, custodial and maintenance services and enable us to effectively and efficiently manage a pipeline of competition over the next six years."

On 26 June 2020 the Government announced plans for a further 4 prisons, although a site only exists for one of them. It claimed, without evidence, that the new prisons would cut reoffending. It stated that at least one of the four would be publicly run.

=== Contractual arrangements ===
In the UK there are three ways in which a private company may take on management of a prison:

1. Companies compete to finance, design, build and run a new prison under the private finance initiative. Most prisons in the UK are of this kind, although the use of PFI has now been abandoned.
2. The Government builds a prison and then contracts out its operation.
3. A prison formerly operated by the public sector prison service may be contracted out after competition ("market testing").

Prisons may be re-competed at the end of the contract. Increasingly, a range of services within all prisons, whether public or privately run, are contracted out on a regional basis: this includes works and FM services, and rehabilitation programmes.

=== Governance and accountability ===
Privately run prisons are run under contracts which set out the standards that must be met. Payments may be deducted for poor performance against the contract. Government monitors ("controllers") work permanently within each privately managed prison to check on conditions and treatment of prisoners. The framework for regulation and accountability is much the same for privately run prisons as for publicly run ones. In England and Wales they are subject to unannounced inspection by HM Chief Inspector of Prisons, to monitoring by local Independent Monitoring Boards and prisoner complaints are dealt with by the Prison and Probation Ombudsman. Similar arrangements exist in Scotland and Northern Ireland.

=== Evaluation ===
There has been little systematic, objective evaluation of private prisons in the UK. The best study, by the Institute of Criminology at Cambridge University, using direct observation of staff and prisoner behaviour, found that public sector staff tended to be more knowledgeable and confident, while the private sector treated prisoners more respectfully, though one private prison scored well on both. Earlier, cruder, studies came to broadly the same conclusion. Another study found marked improvements in prisoner quality of life at Birmingham prison after transfer from public to private sector (though subsequently, conditions at Birmingham deteriorated to such a degree that the contract was ended and the prison returned to public operation). An analysis of performance assessments of individual prisons by the Chief Inspector of Prisons and by the Prison Service suggested no consistent difference in service quality between sectors The same study showed that construction and operating costs were for many years much lower in the private sector, but that the gap has narrowed. In May 2019, the Labour Party spokesman on prisons published data showing that the rate of assaults in privately run local prisons is around 40% higher than in publicly run ones.

=== Controversies ===
In early 2012, Frances Crook, chief executive of the Howard League for Penal Reform said Her Majesty's Inspectorate of Prisons encountered an almost nine-fold rise in restraint used in the previous year at Ashfield Young Offenders Institution, which holds 15- to 18-year-olds. She cited "many incidents of strip searching children unnecessarily". Force had been used almost 150 times a month compared to 17 times monthly the prior year, recalling it had "chilling echoes" of circumstances in the choking death of a 15-year-old at Rainsbrook Secure Training Centre after restraints had been applied. Frequent use of force followed failure of wards to obey staff instructions. Three years earlier the institution recorded more than 600 attacks on inmates in one year - the highest number of every jail, including adults, in the country. Crook claimed "This jail has a history of failing children and the public." Managers claimed the increase was due to better reporting of the use of restraints. The institution had been half full during the previous unannounced inspection in 2010. The chief inspector of prisons noted "some staff lacked confidence in challenging poor behaviour." The director of the prison and the YOI admitted there is "room for improvement."

Six members of staff were dismissed from G4S-operated Rainsbrook Secure Training Centre for children in Rugby in May 2015 following a series of incidents of gross misconduct. G4S took the action in response to an Ofsted inspection that reported some staff being on drugs while on duty, colluding with detainees and behaving "extremely inappropriately". The behaviour allegedly included causing distress and humiliation to children by subjecting them to degrading treatment and racist comments.

Four G4S team leaders of Medway Secure Training Centre in Rochester were arrested in January 2016 and four other staff members were placed on restricted duties, following an investigation by the BBC's Panorama TV programme into the centre. Allegations in the television programme included foul language and use of unnecessary force – such physical violence, overuse of restraint techniques (causing one teenager to have difficulties breathing) – on 10 boys aged 14 to 17, as well as a cover-up involving members of staff by avoiding surveillance cameras in order not to be recorded, and purposefully misreporting incidents in order to avoid potential fines and punishment; for example, in one exchange, it was claimed some staff don't report "two or more trainees fighting" because it indicates they've "lost control of the centre", resulting in a potential fine.

G4S-run Medway managers received performance-related pay awards in April 2016, despite the chief inspector of prisons weeks saying weeks earlier that "managerial oversight failed to protect young people from harm at the jail." In January, Panorama showed an undercover reporter working as a guard at the Medway secure training centre (STC) in Kent. The film showed children allegedly being mistreated and claimed that staff falsified records of violent incidents. No senior managers were disciplined or dismissed. Prior to the Panorama programme's broadcast, the Youth Justice Board (YJB), which oversees youth custody in England, stopped placing children in Medway. In February, a Guardian investigation revealed that, in 2003, whistleblowers had warned G4S, the Ministry of Justice (MoJ) and the YJB that staff were mistreating detained children. Their letter, forwarded by Prof John Pitts, a youth justice expert, was ignored. When the prisons inspectorate carried out a snap inspection at Medway it found detainees reported staff had used insulting, aggressive or racist language toward them and felt unsafe in facility portions not covered by closed circuit TV. Reviewers agreed to the legitimacy of evidence presented by Panorama showing, "...targeted bullying of vulnerable boys," by employees, and that, "A larger group of staff must have been aware of unacceptable practice but did not challenge or report this behaviour."

In an earlier Ofsted report on Medway, inspectors said staff and middle managers reported feeling a lack of leadership and having "low, or no confidence in senior managers." Nick Hardwick, at the time the chief inspector of prisons said, "Managerial oversight failed to protect young people from harm. Effective oversight is key to creating a positive culture that prevents poor practice happening and ensuring it is reported when it does." The Guardian newspaper learned that senior managers at Medway received performance-related pay awards in April amounting to between 10-25% of their annual salaries, according to seniority. One 15-year-old girl placed at Medway in 2009 said she was frequently unlawfully restrained over 18 months, citing an occasion in which her face was repeatedly slammed into icy ground. "I assumed the senior management team would be sacked... But now it looks like they have been rewarded for allowing children to be abused in prison," she said. Former Labour MP Sally Keeble has complained about G4S maltreatment in STC's for over ten years, stating: "This is people making personal profit out of tragedy. I hope that justice minister Liz Truss would intervene and make sure these bonuses are not being paid by a Ministry of Justice contractor." Notwithstanding the results of the investigations no senior managers at Medway were disciplined or dismissed. In May, the MoJ said the National Offender Management Service (NOMS) would take over the running of Medway. In July, it formally assumed control of the STC. In February 2016, G4S had announced that it was to sell its children's services business, including the contract to manage two secure training centres. The company hoped to complete the process by the end of 2016.

Following release of an extremely critical report regarding a G4S-operated jail, the Labour party's shadow justice secretary said they would be inclined to take control of for-profit prisons if the industry competitors had not met deadlines imposed upon them. Sadiq Khan's response stressed the need for better contracting, to include liquidated damages provisions. The chief inspector of prisons Nick Hardwick, recommended the crafting of a takeover contingency plan. "It's not delivering what the public should expect of the millions being paid to G4S to run it." Khan said, " I see no difference whether the underperformance is in the public, private or voluntary sector... We shouldn't tolerate mediocrity in the running of our prisons." Khan continued: "We can't go on with scandal after scandal, where the public's money is being squandered and the quality of what's delivered isn't up to scratch. The government is too reliant on a cosy group of big companies. The public are rightly getting fed up to the back teeth of big companies making huge profits out of the taxpayer, which smacks to them of rewards for failure."

== United States ==
In 2018, 8.41% of prisoners in the United States were housed in private prisons. On January 25, 2021, President Joe Biden issued Executive Order 14006 to stop the United States Department of Justice from renewing further contracts with private prisons, although most facilities are run by the states so the order will only apply to about 14,000 inmates housed in federal prisons. This was later rescinded by President Donald Trump on January 20, 2025.

=== Early history ===
One of the earliest examples of prison privatization in the US was in Louisiana in 1844, where a company produced clothing in a factory with inmate labor. In 1852, on the northwest San Francisco Bay in California, inmates of the prison ship Waban began building a contract facility to house themselves at Point Quentin. The prison became known as San Quentin, which is still in operation today, though it was partially transferred from private to public administration.

During Reconstruction (1865–1876) in the south after the Civil War, plantations and businessmen sought to continue exploiting Blacks after the United States ratified the 13th Amendment, which abolished all forms of slavery "except as punishment for a crime". This exception allowed continued enslavement of Black people through convict leases. At this time, racially targeted laws were enacted to incarcerate greater rates of Black people. Southern prisoners laid railroad tracks, worked on plantations, mined coal and performed other labor while enduring terrible conditions including torture as a form of punishment. Some argue that it was designed as a new form of slavery with worse conditions. The system was extremely profitable for former slaveowners and the states. For example, ten percent of Alabama's budget came from convict leases between 1880 and 1904. This system of unpaid labor remained in place until the early 20th century, although the same type of work could be seen as late as the 1960s.

==== 1980s–2009 ====
Federal and state governments have a long history of contracting out specific services to private firms, including medical services, food preparation, vocational training, and inmate transportation. However, the 1980s ushered in a new era of prison privatization as the war on drugs increased prison populations. Overcrowding and rising costs became increasingly problematic for local, state, and federal governments. Private business interests saw an opportunity to expand beyond simple contracting of services into the management and operation of entire prisons.

Modern private prisons first emerged in 1984 when the Corrections Corporation of America (CCA), now known as CoreCivic, was awarded a contract to take over operation of a jail in Hamilton County, Tennessee. The following year, CCA gained further public attention when it offered to take over the entire state prison system of Tennessee for $200 million. The bid was ultimately defeated due to strong opposition from public employees and the skepticism of the state legislature. Sixty-six additional private prisons were opened in the US between 1984 and 1990 housing approximately 7000 inmates.

CCA's $52 million January 1997 purchase of Washington, D.C.'s $100 million Central Treatment Facility was "the first time a prison has been sold outright (although under a lease-back arrangement, ownership is supposed to revert to D.C. after 20 years)."

==== 2010s ====
Statistics from the U.S. Department of Justice show that, as of 2019, there were 116,000 state and federal prisoners housed in privately owned prisons in the U.S., constituting 8.1% of the overall U.S. prison population. Broken down to prison type, 15.7% of the federal prison population in the United States is housed in private prisons and 7.1% of the U.S. state prison population is housed in private prisons.

As of 2017, after a period of steady growth, the number of inmates held in private prisons in the United States has declined modestly and continues to represent a small share of the nation's total prison population. Companies operating such facilities include the Corrections Corporation of America (CCA), the GEO Group, Inc. (formerly known as Wackenhut Securities), Management and Training Corporation (MTC), and Community Education Centers. In the past two decades CCA has seen its profits increase by more than 500 percent. The prison industry as a whole took in over $5 billion in revenue in 2011.

According to journalist Matt Taibbi, Wall Street banks took notice of this influx of cash, and are now some of the prison industry's biggest investors. Wells Fargo has around $100 million invested in GEO Group and $6 million in CCA. Other major investors include Bank of America, Fidelity Investments, General Electric and The Vanguard Group. CCA's share price went from a dollar in 2000 to $34.34 in 2013. Sociologist John L. Campbell and activist and journalist Chris Hedges respectively assert that prisons in the United States have become a "lucrative" and "hugely profitable" business.

In June 2013, students at Columbia University discovered that the institution owned $8 million worth of CCA stock. Less than a year later, students formed a group called Columbia Prison Divest, and delivered a letter to the president of the University demanding total divestment from CCA and full disclosure of future investments. By June 2015, the board of trustees at Columbia University voted to divest from the private prison industry.

CoreCivic (previously CCA) has a capacity of more than 80,000 beds in 65 correctional facilities. The GEO Group operates 57 facilities with a capacity of 49,000 offender beds. The company owns or runs more than 100 properties that operate more than 73,000 beds in sites across the world.

Most privately run facilities are located in the southern and western portions of the United States and include both state and federal offenders. For example, Pecos, Texas is the site of the largest private prison in the world, the Reeves County Detention Complex, operated by the GEO Group. It has a capacity of 3,763 prisoners in its three sub-complexes,

Private prison firms, reacting to reductions in prison populations, are increasingly looking away from mere incarceration and are seeking to maintain profitability by expanding into new markets previously served by non-profit behavioral health and treatment-oriented agencies, including prison medical care, forensic mental hospitals, civil commitment centers, halfway houses and home arrest.

A 2016 report by the U.S. Department of Justice asserts that privately operated federal facilities are less safe, less secure and more punitive than other federal prisons. Shortly thereafter, the DoJ announced it will stop using private prisons. Nevertheless, a month later the Department of Homeland Security renewed a controversial contract with the CCA to continue operating the South Texas Family Residential Center, an immigrant detention facility in Dilley, Texas.

Stock prices for CCA and GEO Group surged following Donald Trump's victory in the 2016 elections. On February 23, the DOJ under Attorney General Jeff Sessions overturned the ban on using private prisons. According to Sessions, "the (Obama administration) memorandum changed long-standing policy and practice, and impaired the bureau's ability to meet the future needs of the federal correctional system. Therefore, I direct the bureau to return to its previous approach." Additionally, both CCA and GEO Group have been expanding into the immigrant detention market. Although the combined revenues of CCA and GEO Group were about $4 billion in 2017 from private prison contracts, their number one customer was ICE.

=== Impact ===
According to a 2021 study, private prison inmates serve longer time in prison than comparable inmates in public prisons. According to Elizabeth S. Anderson, private prisons generate profits by "maximizing the number of beds filled per day" and "primarily by cutting salaries, staff numbers, and staff training." As a result of the latter, according to a 2016 report by the OIG on privatized federal prisons, privatized facilities see prisoner-on-prisoner assault rates that are 32 percent higher, prisoner-on-staff assault rates 260 percent higher, and rates of prisoner-on-staff sexual assault 500 percent higher when compared to state-run facilities. She says while the state-run facilities are "horrific" for both staff and prisoners, "the profit motive in privatized punishment merely adds to the unconscionable harms and injustices of the American system of mass incarceration."

=== Increase in the prison population ===
From 1925 to 1980 the prison population stayed consistent with the general population. The private prison population began to increase at an disproportional rate in 1983 (the year that private prisons began operation in the United States). From 1925 to 1980 the prison population had a gradual increase from 150,000 to 250,000. However, from 1983 to 2016 the prison population has increased from 250,000 to 1,500,000.

The exact causes for this overwhelming increase cannot be assigned to individual policies as even similar types of criminal sentencing policies were associated with wildly different rates of incarceration in different communities due to powerful external factors such as income disparity, racial makeup, and even the party affiliation of the lawmakers. Correlated with the rise of incarceration rates in the United States was the abolition of loose sentencing guidelines for crimes. Before 1970 in the United States judges were given generally wide sentencing frames (2–20 years), allowing judges ample room for judicial discretion. Liberal Americans argued that this system left room for discrimination in sentencing while conservatives argued that this discretion led to unduly lenient sentences. Under pressure from both sides, many states adopted presumptive sentencing practices or presumptive sentencing guidelines. These policies presented a single recommended sentence among the wider statutory range. This left judges with some room to increase or reduce the sentence in response to mitigating or aggravating circumstances but generally limited their discretion under penalty of automatic appeal through appellate review. Accompanying this change was the adoption of determinate sentencing practices. These acted in the same way as presumptive sentencing but instead concerned release. Adoption of these types of laws effectively ended discretionary parole release for all offenses and made mandatory minimum sentences the norm. Researchers have had mixed results in trying to determine whether these policies themselves led to increased incarceration rates and the results largely depended on the demographics of the community in question. Based on a correlation matrix assembled by Stemen and Rengifo it was shown that the percentage of black residents in a community had a much higher correlation with an increased incarceration rate than the area's choice of sentencing policy. Determinate sentencing was however linked with increased drug arrests which correlated highly with increased incarceration rate and minority population percentage. Determinate and structured sentencing policies on their own lead to more stable jail times as they leave less room for judicial input. In doing so they embody the attitudes of the population at the time they were created. As a result of their static nature these policies were not well adapted to face the wave of drug related offenses created by the crack epidemic of the 1980s and the modern opioid crisis.

When Reagan's war on drugs lead to a massive rise in numbers in prisons, private prison operators were quick to seize the opportunity. According to statistics from "Banking on Bondage: Private Prisons and Mass Incarceration," from 1990 to 2009 there was a 1664 percent increase in the American private prison population, from approximately 7000 to 129,000 inmates. However, the vast majority of prisoners, over 90 percent, remain in publicly-run prisons.

=== Cost–benefit analysis ===
To properly compare the benefits of private versus public prisons, the prisons must share common factors such as similar levels of security, number of staff, and population in the prisons. Studies, some partially industry-funded, often conclude that states can save money by using for-profit prisons. However, academic or state-funded studies have found that private prisons tend to keep more low-cost inmates and send high-cost back to state-run prisons. This is counterproductive to the cost benefit analysis of the Private Prisons and contradicts the original selling point of the CCA and other private prisons; "to mitigate the cost of running prisons". In practice these companies have not been shown to definitively reduce costs and have created several unintended outcomes. The supposed benefit of outsourcing correctional services takes root in the liberal economic idea that having multiple companies compete to provide a service would naturally make the companies innovate and find ways to increase their efficiency to win more contracts than the others. Few companies ever got involved in the business. In the United States CoreCivic, GEO Group Incorporated, and Management and Training Corporation house all the privately held federal inmates and most state inmates across the United States. (United States, Department of Justice, Office of the Inspector General,1 ) Naturally, this means there is little competition within the industry.

When comparing the quality of the services that private prisons provide versus their public counterparts a 2016 report from the Office of the Inspector General found that private facilities underperformed their public counterparts in several key safety areas. 14 private prisons were surveyed in this study and compared to 14 federally operated facilities of the same security level in this study. Privately run facilities were found to have higher rates of inmate on inmate and inmate on staff assaults per capita. Twice as many weapons and eight times as many contraband phones were confiscated per capita at private facilities versus their public counterparts.

Determining the quality per dollar spent by private prisons is a difficult proposition. At a surface level the Federal Bureau of Prisons (BOP) reports that private prisons expended an average of $22,488 annually per capita from 2011-2014 while BOP institutions expended $24,426. This may seem like a clear indication of savings but there is a critical lack of information about how the money supplied to private institutions is being spent each month. The Federal Bureau of Prisons (BOP) which oversees both federal and private prisons in the United States does not receive cost information broken out by function or department for private institutions, leaving them no way to compare the expenditures made in key cost-saving areas such as food and medical care. Without this data federal overseers cannot adequately evaluate the efficiency of the programs offered at private institutions. Several Research studies have indicated that the cost savings indicated in these reports may come from lower wages, lower staffing levels and reduced employee training at these private facilities. Another consideration when examining these cost savings is the disparity in the inmates housed at private facilities versus those that are publicly funded. Private institutions often have a laundry list of internal rules about the kinds of prisoners they will house. These rules are designed to prevent private companies from taking on prisoners that will be particularly costly to house. Christopher Petrella a researcher at the University of California investigated some of the rules set forth by CoreCivic in their contract with the California Department of Corrections and Rehabilitation. Based on their agreement CoreCivic could refuse the intake of prisoners over a multitude of health issues such as HIV of Hepatitis C positive status as well as mental health concerns. This is indicative of a greater trend across the United States. Private prisons tend to house prisoners that carry lower risk levels and require fewer services than their public counterparts making direct comparisons of savings unreliable.

According to a 2020 study of private prisons in Mississippi, "private prison inmates serve 90 additional days... The delayed release erodes half of the cost savings offered by private contracting and is linked to the greater likelihood of conduct violations in private prisons."

=== Costs ===
Proponents of privately run prisons contend that cost-savings and efficiency of operation place private prisons at an advantage over public prisons and support the argument for privatization, but some research casts doubt on the validity of these arguments, as evidence has shown that private prisons are neither demonstrably more cost-effective, nor more efficient than public prisons. An evaluation of 24 different studies on cost-effectiveness revealed that, at best, results of the question are inconclusive and, at worst, there is no difference in cost-effectiveness.

A study by the U.S. Bureau of Justice Statistics found that the cost-savings promised by private prisons "have simply not materialized". Some research has concluded that for-profit prisons cost more than public prisons. Furthermore, cost estimates from privatization advocates may be misleading, because private facilities often refuse to accept inmates that cost the most to house. A 2001 study concluded that a pattern of sending less expensive inmates to privately run facilities artificially inflated cost savings. A 2005 study found that Arizona's public facilities were seven times more likely to house violent offenders and three times more likely to house those convicted of more serious offenses. A 2011 report by the American Civil Liberties Union point out that private prisons are more costly, more violent and less accountable than public prisons, and are actually a major contributor to increased mass incarceration. This is most apparent in Louisiana, which has the highest incarceration rate in the world and houses the majority of its inmates in for-profit facilities. Marie Gottschalk, professor of political science at the University of Pennsylvania, argues that the prison industry "engages in a lot of cherry-picking and cost-shifting to maintain the illusion that the private sector does it better for less." In fact, she notes that studies generally show that private facilities are more dangerous for both correctional officers and inmates than their public counterparts as a result of cost-cutting measures, such as spending less on training for correctional officers (and paying them lower wages) and providing only the most basic medical care for inmates.

A 2014 study by a doctoral candidate at UC Berkeley shows that minorities make up a greater percentage of inmates at private prisons than in their public counterparts, largely because minorities are cheaper to incarcerate. According to the study, for-profit prison operators, in particular CCA and GEO Group, accumulate these low-cost inmates "through explicit and implicit exemptions written into contracts between these private prison management companies and state departments of correction".

Recidivism rates, how many prisoners are re-arrested after release, are not usually considered to measure performance. A study in 2005 found that out of half of the federal prisoners released that year, 49.3% were arrested again later on. Pennsylvania became one of the first states to offer a financial incentive to corrections facilities that were privately operated and could lower their recidivism rates in 2013. In order for these facilities to gain a 1% bonus, they had to lower rates to 10% below the baseline. Together, all 40 of these facilities in the state had an average of 16.4% reduction in their recidivism rates.

=== Inadequacies including being understaffed ===
Evidence suggests that lower staffing levels and training at private facilities may lead to increases in the incidence of violence and escapes. A nationwide study found that assaults on guards by inmates were 49 percent more frequent in private prisons than in government-run prisons. The same study revealed that assaults on fellow inmates were 65 percent more frequent in private prisons.

An example of private prisons' inadequate staff training leading to jail violence was reported by two Bloomberg News journalists, Margaret Newkirk and William Selway in Mississippi regarding the now-closed Walnut Grove Correctional Facility (WGCF). According to the journalists, the ratio of staff to prisoners in this prison was only 1 to 120. In a bloody riot in this prison, six inmates were rushed to the hospital, including one with permanent brain damage. During the riot, the staff of the prison did not respond but waited until the melee ended, because prisoners outnumbered staff by a ratio of 60–1. The lack of well-trained staff does not only lead to violence but also corruption. According to a former WGCF prisoner, the corrections officers were also responsible for smuggling operations within the prison. To make more money, some provided prisoners with contraband, including drugs, cellphones and weapons. Law enforcement investigations led to the exposure of a far wider web of corruption.

=== Bureaucratic corruption scandals ===
At the Walnut Grove C.F., intense corruption was involved in the construction and operation of, and subcontracting for medical, commissary and other services. After exposure of the rape of a female transitional center prisoner by the mayor, who also served as a warden, a bribery scheme was uncovered. It had paid millions to the corrupt Mississippi Department of Corrections Commissioner Chris Epps and his conduits. Ten additional officials and consultants, including three former state legislators (two Republicans and one Democrat), were indicted in the Department of Justice's Operation Mississippi Hustle prosecution.

Prior to the Mississippi investigations and prosecutions, a similar investigation began in 2003, dubbed Operation Polar Pen, exposed a wide-ranging bribery scheme of what legislative members themselves called the "Corrupt Bastards Club" (CBC). It initially involved for-profit corrections, then extended to include fisheries management and oil industry taxation. At least fifteen targets of the investigation, including ten sitting or former elected officials, the governor's chief of staff, and four lobbyists were considered for possible prosecution, and a dozen were indicted. Investigation of a Democratic state senator found nothing amiss, but ten indictments were issued that included six Republican state legislators, two halfway house lobbyists, two very wealthy contractors and the U.S. Senator, Ted Stevens. The seven felony convictions against Stevens were overturned, as were verdicts involving three other legislators and the governor's Chief of Staff, one directly due to the Supreme Court's overturning part of the existing "Honest Services Fraud" in the case of Representative Bruce Weyhrauch. Weyhrauch pleaded guilty to a state misdemeanor. Others also had their verdicts overturned, in part because the prosecution failed to completely disclose exculpatory evidence to their defense, but three of those also pleaded guilty to lesser charges. Though they were implicated, the Department of Justice also declined to prosecute a former state senator and the U.S. Congressman, Don Young, who spent over a million dollars on his defense, though he was never indicted.

=== Judicial corruption scandal ===
In the kids for cash scandal, Mid-Atlantic Youth Services Corp, a private prison company which runs juvenile facilities, was found guilty of paying two judges, Mark Ciavarella and Michael Conahan, $2.8 million to send 2,000 children to their prisons for such alleged crimes as trespassing in vacant buildings and stealing DVDs from Wal-Mart. Sentenced to 28 years in federal prison, Ciavarella will spend his time in Kentucky at Federal Correctional Institution Ashland. The two judges were not the only ones at fault though, seeing as the First National Community Bank never reported the suspicious activity, causing the scandal to go on even longer. In the end, FNCB was fined $1.5 million for failing to report the suspicious activities including transactions that went on over a total of 5 years.

=== Lobbying ===
"From 1999-2010, the Sentencing Project found that Corrections Corporation of America (CCA) spent on average, $1.4 million per year on lobbying at the federal level and employed a yearly average of seventy lobbyists at the state level."

The influence of the for-profit prison industry on the government has been described as the prison–industrial complex.

CoreCivic (previously CCA), MTC and The GEO Group have been members of the American Legislative Exchange Council (ALEC), a Washington, D.C.–based public policy organization that develops model legislation that advances free-market principles such as privatization. Under their Criminal Justice Task Force, ALEC has developed model bills which State legislators can then consult when proposing "tough on crime" initiatives including "Truth in Sentencing" and "Three Strikes" laws. By funding and participating in ALEC's Criminal Justice Task Forces, critics argue, private prison companies influence legislation for tougher, longer sentences. Writing in Governing magazine in 2003, Alan Greenblatt states:

ALEC has been a major force behind both privatizing state prison space and keeping prisons filled. It puts forward bills providing for mandatory minimum sentences and three-strikes sentencing requirements. About 40 states passed versions of ALEC's Truth in Sentencing model bill, which requires prisoners convicted of violent crimes to serve most of their sentences without chance of parole.

According to Cooper, Heldman, Ackerman, and Farrar-Meyers (2016), ALEC has been known to push for the expansion of the private prison industry by promoting greater use of private prisons, goods, and services; promoting greater use of prison labor; and increasing the size of prison populations. ALEC has had a hand in not only broadening the definition of existing crimes, but also in the creation of new crimes. ALEC is known for developing policies that may threaten civil liberties by increasing the probabilities of incarceration and lengthy sentences (Cooper et al., 2016).

According to a 2010 report by NPR, ALEC arranged meetings between the Corrections Corporation of America and Arizona's state legislators such as Russell Pearce at the Grand Hyatt in Washington, D.C. to write Arizona SB 1070, which would keep CCA's immigrant detention centers stuffed with detainees.

CCA and GEO have both engaged in state initiatives to increase sentences for offenders and to create new crimes, including, CCA helping to finance Proposition 6 in California in 2008 and GEO lobbying for Jessica's Law in Kansas in 2006. In 2012, The CCA sent a letter to 48 states offering to buy public prisons in exchange for a promise to keep the prisons at 90% occupancy for 20 years. States that sign such contracts with prison companies must reimburse them for beds that go unused; in 2011, Arizona agreed to pay Management & Training Corporation $3 million for empty beds when a 97 percent quota wasn't met. In 2012 it was reported that the DEA had met up with the CCA to incorporate laws that would increase the CCA's prison population and in turn increased the CCA's prison population. CCA, now CoreCivic, closed their facility in Estancia, New Mexico as the lack of prisoners made them unable to turn a profit, which left 200 employees without jobs.

OpenSecrets reported that private prison corporations donated a record breaking 1.6 million in federally disclosed contributions in the 2018 midterm elections.

=== Opposition ===
Many organizations have called for a moratorium on construction of private prisons, or for their outright abolition. The Presbyterian Church (U.S.A.) and United Methodist Church have also joined the call, as well as a group of Southern Catholic Bishops.

As of 2013, there has been a modest pushback against the private prison industry, with protests forcing GEO Group to withdraw its $6 million offer for naming rights of FAU Stadium, and Kentucky allowing its contract with the CCA to expire, ending three decades of allowing for-profit companies to operate prisons in that state. In 2014, Idaho will be taking over the operation of the Idaho Correctional Center from the CCA, which has been the subject of a plethora of lawsuits alleging rampant violence, understaffing, gang activity and contract fraud. Idaho governor Butch Otter said "In recognition of what's happened, what's happening, it's necessary. It's the right thing to do. It's disappointing because I am a champion of privatization."

In the final quarter of 2013, Scopia Capital Management, DSM North America, and Amica Mutual Insurance divested around $60 million from CCA and GEO Group. In a Color of Change press release, DSM North America President Hugh Welsh said:

In accordance with the principles of the UN Global Compact, with respect to the protection of internationally proclaimed human rights, the pension fund has divested from the for-profit prison industry. Investment in private prisons and support for the industry is financially unsound, and divestment was the right thing to do for our clients, shareholders, and the country as a whole.

=== Attempts to limit privatization and increase oversight ===
Some U.S. states have imposed bans, population limits, and strict operational guidelines on private prisons:

- Banning privatization of state and local facilities – Illinois in 1990 (Private Correctional Facility Moratorium Act), and New York in 2000, enacted laws that ban the privatization of prisons, correctional facilities and any services related to their operation. Louisiana enacted a moratorium on private prisons in 2001. In September 2019, the California legislature passed a bill that would prohibit private prison companies from operating in the state; however, ICE later extended a contract to continue the use of private prisons into the future due to it being exempt from state laws as it is a federal agency pursuant to the Supremacy Clause and due to the fact that Congress has not banned the use of private prisons.
- Banning speculative private prison construction – For-profit prison companies have built new prisons before they were awarded privatization contracts in order to lure state contract approval. In 2001, Wisconsin's joint budget committee recommended language to ban all future speculative prison construction in the state. Such anticipatory building dates back to at least 1997, when Corrections Corporation of America built a 2,000-bed facility in California at a cost of $80–100 million with no contract from the California Department of Corrections; a CCA official was quoted as saying, "If we build it, they will come".
- Banning exportation and importation of prisoners – To ensure that the state retains control over the quality and security of correctional facilities, North Dakota passed a bill in 2001 that banned the export of Class A and AA felons outside the state. Similarly, Oregon allowed an existing exportation law to sunset in 2001, effectively banning the export of prisoners. Several states have considered banning the importation of prisoners to private facilities.
- Requiring standards comparable to state prisons – New Mexico enacted legislation that transfers supervision of private prisons to the state Secretary of Corrections, ensuring that private prisons meet the same standards as public facilities. In 2001, Nebraska legislation that requires private prisons to meet public prison standards was overwhelmingly approved by the legislature, but pocket-vetoed by the governor. Oklahoma passed a law in 2005 that requires private prisons to have emergency plans in place and mandates state notification of any safety incidents.

The Federal Bureau of Prisons announced its intent to end for-profit prison contracts.

- Terminating federal contracts. On August 18, 2016, Deputy U.S. Attorney General Sally Yates announced that the Justice Department intended to end its Bureau of Prisons contracts with for-profit prison operators, because it concluded "...the facilities are both less safe and less effective at providing correctional services..." than the Federal Bureau of Prisons. In response, Issa Arnita, the spokesperson for the third largest U.S. for-profit prison operator Management and Training Corporation, said it was "disappointed" to learn about the DOJ's decision. "If the DOJ's decision to end the use of contract prisons were based solely on declining inmate populations, there may be some justification, but to base this decision on cost, safety and security, and programming is wrong." In a memorandum, Yates continued, for-profit "...prisons served an important role during a difficult period, but time has shown that they compare poorly to our own Bureau facilities. They simply do not provide the same level of correctional services, programs, and resources; they do not save substantially on costs; and as noted in a recent report by the Department's Office of Inspector General, they do not maintain the same level of safety and security. The rehabilitative services that the Bureau provides, such as educational programs and job training, have proved difficult to replicate and outsource and these services are essential to reducing recidivism and improving public safety. Also, the recidivism rates of the private prisons, "Within three years of release, about two-thirds (67.8 percent) of released prisoners were rearrested. Within five years of release, about three-quarters (76.6 percent) of released prisoners were rearrested. Of those prisoners who were rearrested, more than half (56.7 percent) were arrested by the end of the first year." These private prison recidivism rates, compared to the public prison's recidivism rates, are virtually identical and in return have minuscule benefits . At the time, the Justice Department held 193,000 inmates, about 22,000 of whom were in 14 private prisons. Criminal justice reform had caused the prison population to drop by about 25,000 inmates over the previous few years. Separately the Department of Homeland Security intends to continue to hold some suspected illegal aliens in private prisons.

=== Media coverage in the United States ===
==== Documentary ====
- Kids for cash scandal was featured in Capitalism: A Love Story, the 2009 documentary by Michael Moore.
- A full-length documentary covering the kids for cash scandal entitled Kids for Cash was released in February 2014.
- 13th is an Oscar-nominated 2016 documentary that examines the role of private prison contracts in the mass incarceration of blacks and Latinos, primarily, in the United States. The name refers to the Thirteenth Amendment which abolished slavery, yet allows for involuntary servitude as a punishment for crime.

==== Drama ====
- Kids for Cash scandal has also led to several portrayals in fictional works. Both the Law & Order: SVU episode "Crush" and an episode of The Good Wife featured corrupt judges sending children to private detention centers. An episode of Cold Case titled "Jurisprudence" is loosely based on this event.
- Season 3 of Orange Is the New Black portrays the transformation of the prison from federally owned to a privately owned prison for-profit.
- An episode of Elementary focuses on private prisons competing with each other in New Jersey to win a bid for another prison.
- An episode of Boston Legal sees a 15-year-old former inmate suing a private prison over an alleged rape by one of its corrections officers.

== See also ==
- Convict lease
- Correctional Services Corporation
- Critical Resistance
- Angela Davis
- East Mississippi Correctional Facility
- Prison abolition movement
- Prison–industrial complex
- Private probation
- Privatization
- Public–private partnership
- Wackenhut Corp.
- Walnut Grove Correctional Facility
- Winn Correctional Center
