= Mark Ciavarella =

American convicted felon, former judge (born 1950)

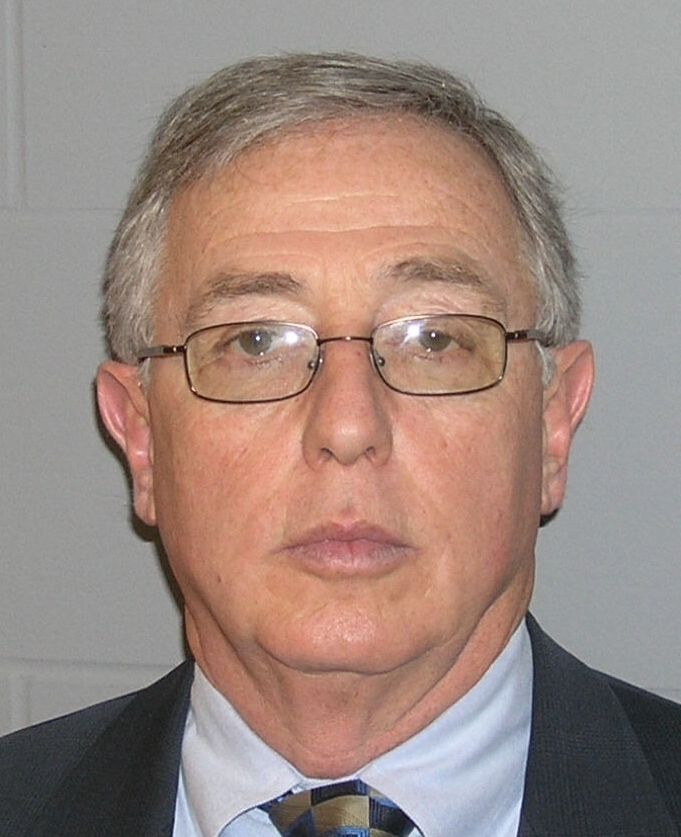
- Mugshot of Ciavarella
- Born: Mark Arthur Ciavarella Jr. March 3, 1950 (age 76); Wilkes-Barre, Pennsylvania, US
- Education: King's College; Duquesne Law School
- Occupation: Former President Judge
- Years active: 1996–2009
- Known for: Kids for cash scandal
- Successor: Chester B. Muroski
- Spouse: Cindy Baer (div. 2013)
- Status: Federal inmate #15008-067 Federal Correctional Institution, Ashland, Kentucky
- Criminal charges: Racketeering, fraud, money laundering, extortion, bribery, and federal tax violations
- Penalty: 28 years in federal prison

Mark Arthur Ciavarella Jr. (born March 3, 1950) is an American convicted felon and disgraced former President Judge of the Luzerne County Court of Common Pleas in Wilkes-Barre, Pennsylvania, who was involved, along with fellow judge Michael Conahan, in the "kids for cash" scandal in 2008, for which he was sentenced to 28 years in federal prison in 2011.

== Biography ==
Ciavarella was a lifelong resident of Wilkes-Barre, Pennsylvania, having been raised in the East End section of the city and attending St. Mary's High School. After graduating from the local King's College he attended Duquesne University School of Law, receiving his J.D. degree in 1975. Ciavarella entered private legal practice, becoming a partner in the firm of Lowery, Ciavarella and Rogers. From 1976 to 1978, he was city solicitor and then from 1978 until 1995, he served as solicitor for the city zoning board. In 1995, he ran for judge in Luzerne County on the Democratic ticket and was elected to a ten-year term. He was re-elected to a second ten-year term in 2005. Ciavarella was also active in several civic and Catholic organizations. He was married to Cindy Baer and the couple have three children. They separated on September 15, 2010, and in May 2013, she filed for divorce.

== "Kids for cash" scandal ==
Ciavarella pleaded guilty on February 13, 2009, pursuant to a plea agreement, to federal charges of honest services fraud, wire fraud and tax evasion in connection with receiving $2.6 million in kickbacks from Robert Powell and Robert Mericle, the co-owner and builder respectively, of two private, for-profit juvenile facilities of PA Child Care. In exchange for these kickbacks, Ciavarella sentenced children to extended stays in juvenile detention for offenses as minimal as mocking a principal on Myspace, trespassing in a vacant building, acting as a lookout for a shoplifter of DVDs from Wal-mart, jaywalking, and driving a car over a curb without a driver's licence. More specifically, Ciavarella was charged with the crimes of conspiracy to deprive the public of the "intangible right of honest services", or corruption, and conspiracy to defraud the United States by failing to report income to the Internal Revenue Service. Ciavarella tendered his resignation to Pennsylvania Governor Ed Rendell on January 23, 2009, prior to official publication of the charges.

The plea agreement witnessed by defense attorneys Albert Flora and William Ruzzo called for Ciavarella to serve up to seven years in prison, pay fines and restitution, and accept responsibility for the crimes. However, Ciavarella denied that there was a connection between the juvenile sentences he rendered and the kickbacks he received. In part because of this denial, on July 30, 2009, Judge Edwin M. Kosik of the U.S. District Court for the Middle District of Pennsylvania rejected the plea agreement. He ruled that Ciavarella had continued to deny that there was a "quid pro quo" between his receipt of money and his jailing of juveniles, instead characterizing the money as a "finder’s fee" despite what Judge Kosik felt was the weight of the government's evidence. Ciavarella's attorneys and his co-conspirator, Michael Conahan, brought a motion requesting reconsideration of the judge's rejection of the plea agreement. The motion was denied on August 24, and Ciavarella and Conahan withdrew their guilty pleas, resulting in the case going to trial.

On September 9, 2009, a federal grand jury in Harrisburg, Pennsylvania, returned a 48-count indictment against Ciavarella and Conahan, which included racketeering, fraud, money laundering, extortion, bribery, and federal tax violations. Both judges were arraigned on the charges on September 15, 2009. Ciavarella and Conahan entered pleas of not guilty to the 48-count indictment, and remained free on $1 million bail, despite federal prosecutors contentions that their bail should be raised since they now faced the possibility of substantially more prison time and that there was evidence of their attempts to shield assets.

On February 18, 2011, a jury in federal court found Ciavarella guilty of racketeering. This charge stemmed from Ciavarella accepting $997,000 in illegal payments from Robert Mericle, the real estate developer of PA Child Care, and attorney Robert Powell, a co-owner of the facility. Ciavarella was also on trial for 38 other counts including accepting numerous payments from Mericle and Powell as well as tax evasion.

On August 11, 2011, Kosik sentenced Ciavarella to 28 years in federal prison. Ciavarella appealed his conviction and sentence to the U.S. Court of Appeals for the Third Circuit. On May 24, 2013, the Third Circuit vacated one count of the indictment against Ciavarella, but upheld all other charges, as well as his sentence. The Third Circuit refused to reconsider on July 24, 2013. The Supreme Court of the United States, which rarely accepts such cases, declined to hear the appeal in 2014, although Ciavarella could file a post-conviction relief motion before U.S. District Court within one year. With good behavior, he could be released in fewer than 24 years, when he would be 85. Ciavarella initially served his sentence at Federal Correctional Institution, Pekin in Pekin, Illinois.

He is registered as inmate 15008-067 at the Federal Correctional Institution at Ashland, Kentucky. His projected release date is June 18, 2034.

On January 9, 2018, federal judge Christopher C. Conner threw out Ciavarella's convictions for racketeering, conspiracy to commit racketeering, and conspiracy to commit money laundering on appeal. Conner upheld Civarella's contention that his attorneys failed to raise statute of limitations claims on those charges. He ordered a new trial on those counts, but allowed the honest services fraud convictions to stand. On January 24, 2020, prosecutors formally notified the court that they would not seek to retry Ciaverella on these three counts. In response, Ciavarella's defense attorneys sought a reduction of his prison sentence, which was rejected.

On October 1, 2019, Ciavarella was disbarred on consent from the practice of law by the Commonwealth of Pennsylvania.

In June 2020, Ciavarella's co-defendant Conahan was released from prison and placed under home confinement due to the COVID-19 pandemic. On December 11, 2024, Conahan's sentence was commuted by President Joe Biden.

=== Civil lawsuits ===
Ciavarella is a defendant in a class action lawsuit filed by the Juvenile Law Center on behalf of the juveniles who were adjudicated delinquent by him despite not being represented by counsel or advised of their rights. He has moved to dismiss this lawsuit as it pertains to him based on judicial immunity. He is also named as a defendant in three other lawsuits, however, all four lawsuits have been consolidated into one master class action lawsuit which was filed in June and then amended in late August 2009.

The plaintiffs, in a 75-page court filing on September 9, 2009, argued that the actions of Ciavarella and Conahan should not be "fully shielded by absolutely judicial immunity or legislative immunity", because their actions went beyond their judicial and administrative duties.

== Review of judicial rulings ==
The Supreme Court of Pennsylvania, using its rarely invoked power of "King's Bench jurisdiction", appointed Senior Judge Arthur Grim as special master to review all of Ciavarella's juvenile sentences. On March 11, 2009, Grim recommended that all adjudications handed down by Ciavarella between 2003 and 2008 be thrown out. Grim concluded that the kickbacks and Ciavarella's disregard for the juveniles' rights meant that no one who appeared before him had received an impartial hearing. On March 26, 2009, the Supreme Court of Pennsylvania accepted Grim's recommendations and threw out hundreds of Ciavarella's juvenile convictions on the grounds that the defendants' rights had been violated.

In early 2009, the Wilkes-Barre daily newspaper The Citizens' Voice accused Judge Ciavarella of improperly concealing a conflict of interest when he rendered a $3.5 million defamation judgment against the paper, and it moved to have the case reopened. The Supreme Court of Pennsylvania appointed Lehigh County President Judge William H. Platt to conduct hearings into the matter. After two days of testimony that July, Judge Platt recommended that the verdict be vacated and a new trial be conducted. His recommendation was partially based on the fact that Ciavarella admitted that he wrongly presided over cases involving clients of Robert J. Powell, an attorney who paid Ciavarella and Conahan more than $770,000 in kickbacks.

In June 2009, attorneys from Laputka, Bayless, Ecker & Cohn, a Hazleton law firm, appealed a $3.4 million legal malpractice verdict and wished to supplement the record to indicate that Ciavarella should not have presided over the case and should have recused himself because of his relationship with Powell, who was the opposing attorney.

In early August 2009, the state Supreme Court ordered Luzerne County President Judge Chester Muroski to review a land dispute case that was dismissed by Ciavarella to determine if the ruling was tainted. First National Community Bank had loaned Ciavarella $848,000 and Conahan sat on the bank's board of directors. Ciavarella dismissed a lawsuit by Emil Malinowski against the bank, a ruling which was upheld by the state Superior Court.

Dr. Ki Bum Lee, M.D. requested that a malpractice suit against him by Debra Sharkey be dropped. In court papers filed in early September 2009, Dr. Lee's attorney, Michael Badowski, said Dr. Lee should also be awarded damages after information surfaced regarding Ciavarella, William Sharkey, the former court administrator, and Sharkey's attorney, Robert Powell. Badowski alleged that Sharkey's first cousin and Ciavarella's co-defendant, Judge Michael Conahan, assigned Ciavarella to the malpractice case and that, because of the conflict of interest, Ciavarella had continually ruled against the doctor. The lawsuit, originally filed in October 1997, claimed Lee committed malpractice during Debra Sharkey's hysterectomy.

Judge Thomas L. Ambro of the U.S. Court of Appeals for the Third Circuit ruled, in March 2019, that Ciavarella is not entitled to a new trial which would have followed the precedent set by the U.S. Supreme Court's 2016 ruling in McDonnell v. United States. McDonnell v. United States altered the definition of 'official acts' as they relate to bribery.

In his opinion, Judge Ambro stated that "Ciavarella's bribery-related actions still satisfy even a post-McDonnell understanding of 'official act'. If sentencing hundreds of juvenile offenders to excessive terms of incarceration is not an 'official act', then nothing is."

=== Pension fight ===
Ciavarella, whose resignation from the bench took effect on March 16, 2009, submitted an application for pension benefits that same day, seeking to withdraw a lump sum of $232,051 that included $51,699 in interest and to begin receiving $5,156 in monthly pension benefits. However, Ciavarella agreed to a federal injunction freezing his pension benefits on or about May 27, 2009. The injunction was requested by the U.S. Attorney's office in order to apply the benefits to restitution to the victims.

Subsequently, the Pennsylvania State Employees' Retirement System (SERS) denied pension benefits to Ciavarella, reversing its earlier position that he was eligible to receive benefits until he was sentenced. SERS ruled that the former judge's guilty pleas to fraud and conspiracy in February provided sufficient grounds to deny the benefits. The agency based its determination on the Pension Forfeiture Act, which allows for the denial of benefits to anyone convicted of certain crimes related to their public employment. SERS also refused to repay Ciavarella the $234,000 that he had contributed to the retirement system because the state Department of Public Welfare claimed that he and Conahan are liable for $4.3 million in alleged overpayments it made to two juvenile detention centers.
