= King's Bench jurisdiction =

Power of a US state's highest court

King's Bench jurisdiction or King's Bench power is the extraordinary jurisdiction of an individual US state's highest court over its inferior courts. The states of Pennsylvania, Virginia, Florida, New Mexico, New York, Oklahoma and Wisconsin use the term to describe the extraordinary jurisdiction of their highest court, called the Court of Appeals in New York or the Supreme Court in the other states, over the courts below it. King's Bench jurisdiction includes the power to vacate the judgments of inferior courts when acting in extraordinary circumstances, for example, where the importance of an issue to public well-being or the expediency with which action must be taken in the interest of justice requires superseding normal judicial or appellate procedures. Federal courts in the United States possess the power to issue similar extraordinary writs under the All Writs Act. The term originates from the English Court of King’s Bench.

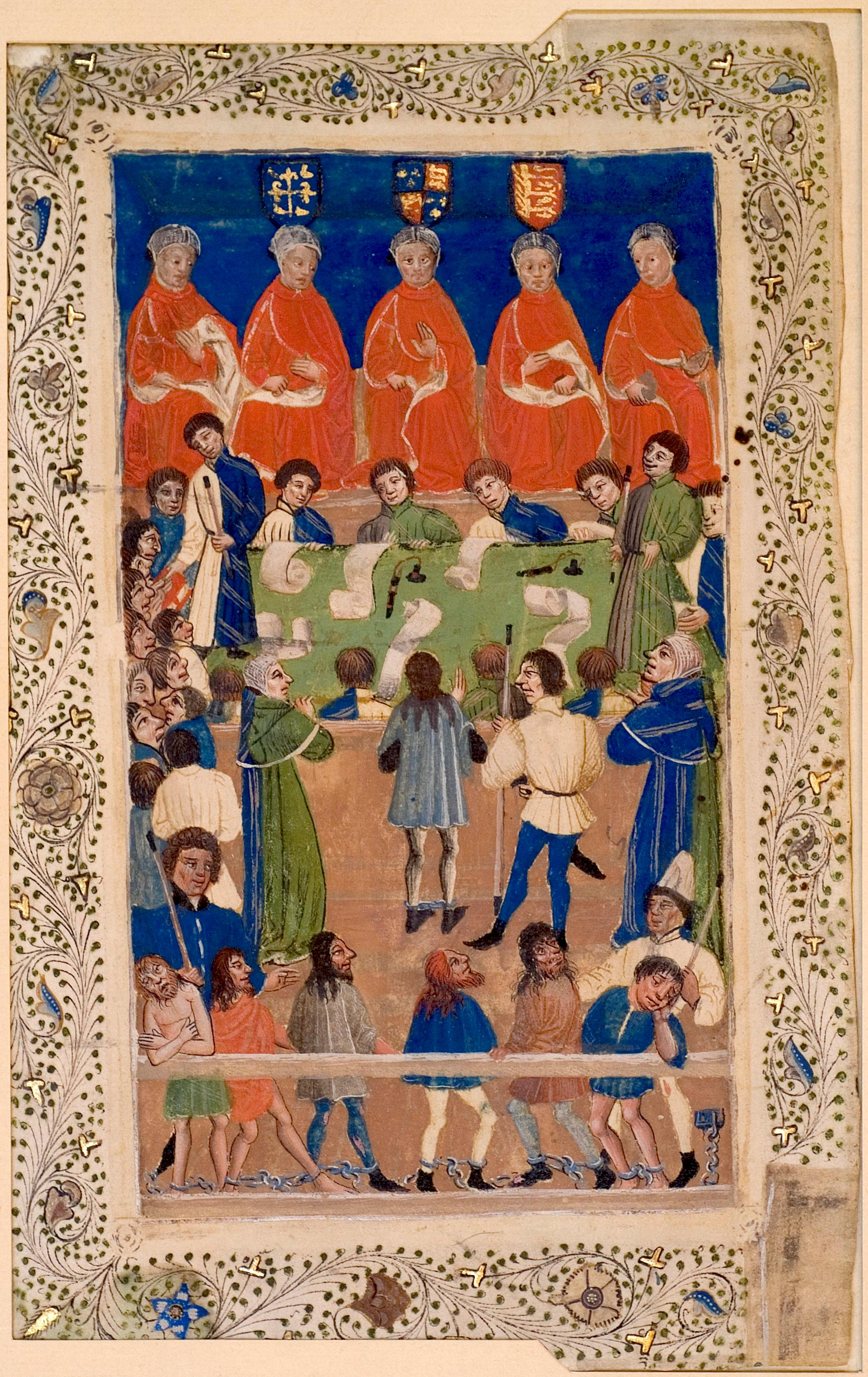
The Court of King's Bench at work. This illuminated manuscript from about 1460 is the earliest known depiction of the English court. It shows the judges of the court, clerks, lawyers and, at the bottom of the illustration, guards watching chained prisoners awaiting trial.

== Pennsylvania ==
The Province of Pennsylvania, also known as the Pennsylvania Colony, was an English proprietary colony from the time of its royal charter in 1681 until the American Revolution in 1776 when Pennsylvania adopted its first Constitution. In Pennsylvania, King’s Bench power refers to an English common law authority which the General Assembly recognized and explicitly bestowed in 1722 on the Supreme Court of Pennsylvania, granting that court by charter constitutional authority over legal and supervisory aspects of the court system in the English colony.

As presently-codified, Pennsylvania statutes state that, "Notwithstanding any other provision of law, the Supreme Court may, on its own motion or upon petition of any party, in any matter pending before any court ... involving an issue of immediate public importance, assume plenary jurisdiction of such matter at any stage thereof and enter a final order or otherwise cause right and justice to be done."

The King’s Bench Powers also are described in Pennsylvania Statutes Title 42, § 502, in language taken from the 1722 Act:

The Supreme Court shall have and exercise the powers vested in it by the Constitution of Pennsylvania, including the power generally to minister justice to all persons and to exercise the powers of the court, as fully and amply, to all intents and purposes, as the justices of the Court of King's Bench, Common Pleas and Exchequer, at Westminster, or any of them, could or might do on May 22, 1722. The Supreme Court shall also have and exercise the following powers: (1) All powers necessary or appropriate in aid of its original and appellate jurisdiction which are agreeable to the usages and principles of law. (2) The powers vested in it by statute, including the provisions of this title.

The Pennsylvania Supreme Court held in In re Bruno, 101 A.3d 635, 677, 627 Pa. 505, 575 (2014), however, that its King’s Bench powers are constitutionally-inherent and are not dependent upon any statute:

[T]he jurisdiction necessary to the exercise of the Court's King's Bench powers — constitutionally-granted powers that are by nature comprehensive and inherently vested in the highest authority of the judicial branch — may be divested only by the people, expressly or by necessary implication. See Ebersoll, 3 Binn. at 531 (“It is fully settled that the jurisdiction of the Court of King's Bench is not ousted unless by express words.”); accord Stander, 250 A.2d at 487 (Roberts, J., concurring) (General Assembly has no constitutional authority to diminish, curtail or interfere with functions of Supreme Court); Robinson Twp., 83 A.3d at 977 (citing Commonwealth ex rel. Carroll v. Tate, 442 Pa. 45, 274 A.2d 193, 196–97 (1971) ) (General Assembly has no authority to remove by statute attributes of governmental entity implicitly necessary to carry into effect entity's constitutional duties).

=== Rolf Larsen and judicial misconduct reform ===
Troubles and public feuds involved the supreme court in the early 1990s, specifically including Justice Rolf Larsen, who was criminally convicted and impeached by the House, then subsequently convicted and removed from office by the State Senate. The public image of Larsen illustrated the need for court reform. The upheaval surrounding Justice Larsen's time on the bench served as a catalyst for a change in the state judicial discipline system. Pennsylvanians for Modern Courts credits the public turmoil he caused with leading to the overwhelming passage of a constitutional amendment that strengthened the way judges are disciplined for misconduct. In 1993, Pennsylvania voters amended the state constitution. The change created a new system for the oversight of judges through a state Judicial Conduct Board, which independently investigates misconduct complaints, and a Court of Judicial Discipline, which independently determines a Pennsylvania judge's innocence or guilt,. The Supreme Court, nevertheless, retains ultimate power over the Commonwealth`s judicial system and judges.

=== Kids for cash scandal ===
The kids for cash scandal, which came to light in 2008, involved two Pennsylvania judges, Mark Ciavarella and Michael Conahan. They were found guilty of accepting millions of dollars in kickbacks from privately owned juvenile detention facilities. In exchange, the judges imposed unduly harsh sentences on juvenile offenders, often for minor infractions, funneling them into these for-profit facilities. The scandal led to widespread public outrage and prompted legal action to address the corruption.

The Pennsylvania Supreme Court invoked its King's Bench jurisdiction to intervene swiftly, vacating thousands of juvenile convictions that Ciavarella had wrongfully imposed. The high court's intervention restored due process to the affected juveniles and demonstrated the court's capacity to take extraordinary measures where justice had been severely compromised.

=== Uses in 2020 ===
In 2020, the Pennsylvania Supreme Court exercised its King's Bench jurisdiction three times, a rare instance of the court using this power multiple times within a single year:

- April 2020: The Court invoked its King's Bench prerogative in Friends of Danny DeVito v. Wolf, a case regarding the Governor's executive order that required businesses and a political campaign office to close due to the COVID-19 pandemic.
- June 2020: In Scarnati v. Wolf, the Court addressed a separation of powers issue between the Legislature and the Executive Branch, specifically determining whether Title 35 of the Pennsylvania Code allowed the Legislature to force an end to emergency decrees issued by the Governor.
- October 2020: The Court used its King's Bench authority to rule that election ballots could not be discarded due to perceived signature mismatches, protecting voters from subjective ballot rejections.

=== 2024 Election ===
Philadelphia, Montgomery and Bucks counties voted to count hundreds of misdated or undated ballots despite court ruling to the contrary. The Pennsylvania Supreme Court invoked its King's Bench authority to intervene.
