= Michael Conahan =

American convicted felon, former judge

- Born: April 21, 1952 (age 74); Hazleton, Pennsylvania, US
- Occupation: Former judge
- Political party: Democratic Party
- Status: BOP #15009-067; Home confinement
- Criminal charges: Money laundering, fraud and racketeering
- Penalty: 17.5 years in prison Over $900,000 in fines and restitution

Michael Thomas Conahan is an American convicted felon and disgraced former judge. He received a J.D. degree from Temple University and went on to serve from 1994 to 2007 as judge on the Court of Common Pleas for Luzerne County. During the last four years of his tenure, he was the president judge of the county.

He was serving a 17.5 year sentence for his part in the "kids for cash" scandal of giving harsh sentences to juvenile offenders, often accused of minor crimes, sending them to for-profit facilities in exchange for kickback payments. Due to coronavirus concerns, Conahan was released on furlough on June 19, 2020, to home confinement. On December 12, 2024, the remainder of his sentence was commuted by President Joe Biden.

== "Kids for cash" ==
Along with his fellow Luzerne County judge Mark Ciavarella, Conahan was found to be involved in the Pennsylvania "kids for cash" scandal in 2008.

Ronald Belletiere from Florida was sentenced in the 1990s to 4½ years in federal prison in connection with a Hazleton cocaine-trafficking ring. A witness in that case testified that in 1986, then-Magisterial District Judge Conahan called to tip him off that his drug connection was being investigated. Conahan allegedly referred the man to Belletiere as a safer source to obtain drugs. During a sidebar with a judge in that case, the prosecutor described Conahan as an "unindicted co-conspirator." That disclosure became public in 1994, eight months after Conahan was sworn in for his first term as a county judge. At a press conference he held to deny the allegation, he blamed the charges on "common criminals" looking for favorable treatment with prosecutors.

After becoming Luzerne county's president judge running under the Democratic Party, Conahan used his budgetary discretion to stop funding the county public youth detention facility, agreeing to send juvenile defendants instead to a newly constructed, for-profit facility. He was subsequently accused of agreeing to generate at least $1.3 million per year in receivables that could be billed to taxpayers in exchange for receiving kickbacks from the facility owner. After indictment, he originally pleaded guilty to charges, but later withdrew his plea. His colleague Mark Ciavarella was also indicted on charges of money laundering, fraud and racketeering. Both judges were disbarred following the guilty pleas.

=== State investigation ===
The Pennsylvania Judicial Conduct Board received four complaints about Conahan between 2004 and 2008, but later admitted it failed to investigate any of them, nor had it sought documentation regarding the cases involved. In 2006, the U.S. Federal Bureau of Investigation was tipped off about Conahan and nepotism in the county courts. An additional investigation into improper sentencing in Luzerne County began early in 2007 resulting from requests for help from several youths that were received by the Philadelphia-based Juvenile Law Center. The Center's attorneys determined that several hundred cases had been tried without the teenaged defendants having received adequate assistance of counsel. In April 2008, the Center petitioned the Pennsylvania Supreme Court seeking relief for alleged violation of the civil rights of those young defendants. The court initially denied the application for relief, then in January 2009 after charges of corruption against both the judges surfaced, it reconsidered in favor of the appellants.

=== Federal investigation ===
The Federal Bureau of Investigation (FBI) and the Internal Revenue Service also investigated the two judges, although the particular timeline and scope of the confidential investigations by the federal agencies were not disclosed. Part of the investigation concerned issues that had been raised during disciplinary hearings over the conduct of another former Luzerne County judge, Anne H. Lokuta. In November 2006, Lokuta appeared before Pennsylvania's Judicial Conduct Board to respond to accusations that she used court workers to do her housework, displayed bias against attorneys arguing cases before her, and publicly humiliated courthouse staff causing those employees mental distress. The board ruled against Lokuta in November 2008, resulting in her removal from the bench. During the course of those disciplinary hearings, Lokuta accused Conahan of bullying behavior, further charging that he was behind a conspiracy to have her removed. Because Lokuta had aided the FBI's investigation into the "kids for cash" scheme prior to the disciplinary board's decision, the Pennsylvania Supreme Court stayed the removal order in March 2009 in light of the ongoing corruption investigations. That paused Lokuta's removal and obviated the election that was scheduled for that May to fill the seat her removal would have left vacant. The supreme court decided, 4–1, to uphold Lokuta's removal from the bench in January 2011, finding that she had indeed received a sufficiently fair trial, regardless of Conahan's adverse testimony. The court also ordered the expungement of the records of 2,401 juveniles who were affected by the judicial misconduct. During the Lokuta hearing, Conahan testified that there were no out-of-court social relationships among the county judges. However, Judge Michael Toole, who was later convicted of case fixing, as well as another county judge, had each stayed at a Florida condo jointly owned by Conahan and Ciavarella.

Shortly after his indictment in January 2009, Conahan pleaded guilty. He later withdrew his plea, intending to take the case to trial. Eventually he pleaded guilty once more. On September 23, 2011, he was sentenced to 17.5 years in prison and ordered to pay over $900,000 in fines and restitution. He was initially held in the low-security complex component of the Federal Correctional Institution, Coleman, in Florida. After almost a decade in prison, Conahan was transferred in 2020 to home confinement, with an anticipated release date of 2026, under a provision of the federal CARES Act that authorized such transfers as a response to the COVID-19 pandemic.

His sentence was commuted by President Joe Biden on December 12, 2024, as part of a blanket commutation of offenders who'd been granted home confinement during the COVID-19 pandemic. The commutation was criticized by victims of the kids-for-cash scandal, as well as Pennsylvania Governor Josh Shapiro, who said that the decision to commute Conahan's sentence was "absolutely wrong".
