= Kids for cash scandal =

Judicial kickbacks case in Pennsylvania

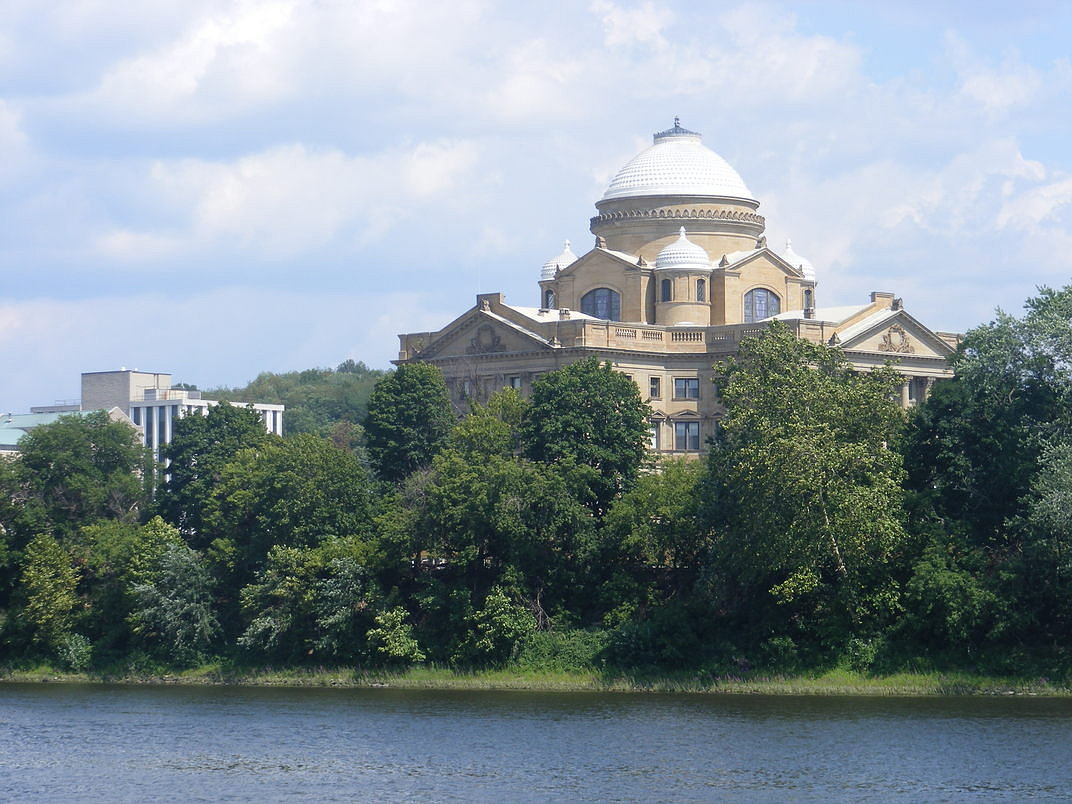
The Luzerne County Courthouse in Wilkes-Barre, Pennsylvania. Corruption within the Court of Common Pleas of Luzerne County was the subject of the kids for cash scandal.

The kids for cash scandal was a political scandal that occurred in Luzerne County, Pennsylvania, in 2009. Michael Conahan and Mark Ciavarella, two judges at the Luzerne County Court of Common Pleas in Wilkes-Barre, were exposed for receiving kickbacks in return for harsh adjudications on juvenile deliquents to increase occupancy at a private prison operated by PA Child Care. Conahan and Ciavarella sent thousands of children in Luzerne County to extended stays in private youth detention centers for minor offenses, some as trivial as trespassing in a vacant building and mocking an assistant principal on Myspace, despite complaints being filed against the judges for their excessive adjudications.

Conahan and Ciavarella were investigated for corruption dating back to 2000, while Robert Mericle, a real estate developer who built and owned the two juvenile detention centers; Robert Powell, a co-owner of the private prisons; and Sandra Brulo, former deputy director of Forensic Services for the Luzerne County Juvenile Probation Office, were also implicated and convicted on additional charges related to the scandal. Conahan and Ciavarella were charged with various racketeering charges after a judge rejected an initial plea agreement in 2009, a federal grand jury returned a 48-count indictment. Conahan pleaded guilty to one count of racketeering conspiracy in 2010 and was sentenced to 17.5 years in federal prison. Ciavarella opted to go to trial, being convicted on 12 of 39 counts in 2011 and sentenced to 28 years in federal prison.

The Supreme Court of Pennsylvania overturned hundreds of adjudications of delinquency in Luzerne County in the wake of the scandal. The Juvenile Law Center filed a class action lawsuit against the judges and numerous other parties, and the Pennsylvania General Assembly created a commission to investigate juvenile justice problems in Luzerne County. Conahan, who had been released to home confinement in 2020, had his sentence (due to end in 2026) commuted in 2024 by President Joe Biden.

== Investigations ==
Pennsylvania's Judicial Conduct Board received four complaints about Michael Conahan between 2004 and 2008, but later admitted it failed to investigate any of them, nor had it sought documentation regarding the cases involved. The FBI was tipped off about Conahan and nepotism in the county courts in 2006. An additional investigation into improper sentencing in Luzerne County began in early 2007 as a result of requests for assistance from several youths received by the Philadelphia-based Juvenile Law Center. Attorneys from the Center determined that several hundred cases were tried without the defendants receiving proper counsel. In April 2008, the Center petitioned the Pennsylvania Supreme Court seeking relief for alleged violation of the youths' civil rights. The application of relief was later denied, then reconsidered in January 2009 when corruption charges against both Conahan and Mark Ciavarella surfaced.

The FBI and the IRS also investigated Conahan and Ciavarella, although the exact dates and scope of these federal investigations were not made public. Part of the investigation was revealed to have occurred during disciplinary hearings over the conduct of another former Luzerne County judge, Ann H. Lokuta. Lokuta was brought before the Judicial Conduct Board in November 2006 to answer charges of using court workers to do her personal bidding, openly displaying bias against some attorneys arguing before her, and publicly berating staff to cause mental distress. The board ruled against Lokuta in November 2008, and she was removed from the bench. During the course of the hearings, Lokuta charged that Conahan was behind a conspiracy to have her removed. She aided the federal investigation into the "kids for cash" scheme prior to the Conduct Board's ruling, and a stay order was issued in March 2009 by the Pennsylvania Supreme Court in light of the ongoing investigations, halting Lokuta's removal and the special election that was to be held to replace her. During the Lokuta hearing, Conahan testified that there were no social relationships amongst the county judges. However, Judge Michael T. Toole (who pleaded guilty to and was convicted in April 2011 of Fraud and Tax Evasion charges) as well as another judge, had each stayed at a Florida condo jointly owned by Conahan and Ciavarella.

The Pennsylvania Supreme Court decided to uphold Lokuta's removal from the bench in January 2011, finding she had received a fair trial, regardless of Conahan's testimony. It also ordered the expungements of the records of 2,401 of those juveniles who were affected.

== Charges and pleas ==
A statement from the U.S. Attorney's Office for the Middle District of Pennsylvania outlined the charges against the two judges on January 26, 2009. The charges outlined in the information described actions between 2000 and 2007 by both judges to assist in the construction and population of private juvenile facilities operated by the two Pennsylvania Child Care companies, acting in an official capacity in favor of the private facilities over the facility operated by Luzerne County.

The U.S. Attorney charged that in 2002 Conahan, who at the time was President Judge of the court, used his authority to remove funding for the county-operated facility. The judges were alleged to have received "millions of dollars" in payments for the completion of a binding agreement between the court and the private facilities, co-owned by attorney Robert Powell, to use their services and the subsequent closing of the county facility. The methods used to conceal the payments involved several parties and transactions which resulted in allegations of tax evasion against the two. Ciavarella and Conahan were also charged with "Ordering juveniles to be sent to these facilities in which the judges had a financial interest even when Juvenile Probation Officers did not recommend placement," according to the statement.

Originally, the negotiated plea agreements called for both judges to serve up to seven years in prison, pay fines and restitution, and accept responsibility for the crimes. However, on July 30, 2009, Judge Edwin M. Kosik of Federal District Court in nearby Scranton rejected the plea agreement, citing "post-guilty plea conduct and expressions from the defendants" that he ruled did not satisfy the terms of the agreement. Kosik wrote that Conahan and Ciavarella continued to deny their crimes even in the face of overwhelming evidence, and therefore did not merit sentences that were well below federal sentencing guidelines. Attorneys for the two judges brought a motion requesting reconsideration of the judge's rejection of the plea agreement. The motion was denied on August 24, 2009, and Ciavarella and Conahan subsequently withdrew their guilty pleas, an action which eventually resulted in a jury trial for Ciavarella and additional charges against the former judges.

Following the plea withdrawals, on September 9, 2009, a federal grand jury in Harrisburg, Pennsylvania returned a 48-count indictment against Ciavarella and Conahan including racketeering, fraud, money laundering, extortion, bribery, and federal tax violations. Both judges were arraigned on the charges on September 15, 2009. Ciavarella and Conahan entered pleas of not guilty on all counts and remained free on $1 million in bail, despite federal prosecutors' contentions that their bail should be raised. Prosecutors argued the judges' bail should have been higher, since they faced the possibility of substantially more prison time and there had been evidence of attempts made to shield assets.

Robert Powell, an attorney at the time and co-owner of the two juvenile facilities at the heart of the scandal, pleaded guilty on July 1, 2009, to failing to report a felony and being an accessory to tax evasion conspiracy, in connection with $770,000 in kickbacks he paid to Ciavarella and Conahan in exchange for facilitating the development of his juvenile detention centers. The Pennsylvania Supreme Court temporarily suspended Powell's law license on August 31, citing his criminal conviction. Several years later, in early 2015, after tending his resignation on January 7, he was disbarred by the state supreme court in the state of Pennsylvania on January 23. The disbarment was made retroactive to the date of his suspension on August 31, 2009.

Robert Mericle, the prominent real estate developer who built the two juvenile facilities, pleaded guilty on September 3, 2009, to failing to disclose a felony. Mericle had failed to tell a grand jury he had paid $2.1 million to Ciavarella and Conahan as a finder's fee. As part of his plea, Mericle agreed to pay $2.15 million to fund local children's health and welfare programs. Mericle faced up to three years in prison and a $250,000 maximum fine. Mericle was released from federal custody in 2015 after serving a one-year sentence.

Sandra Brulo, the former deputy director of Forensic Services for the Luzerne County Juvenile Probation Office, agreed to plead guilty in March 2009 to federal obstruction of justice. Those charges stemmed from actions Brulo took after she became aware she had been named in the federal civil action. Brulo backdated her recommendation of a placement she made concerning a juvenile defendant in September 2007, and changed her original recommendation of placement to probation.

== Criminal verdicts and sentences ==
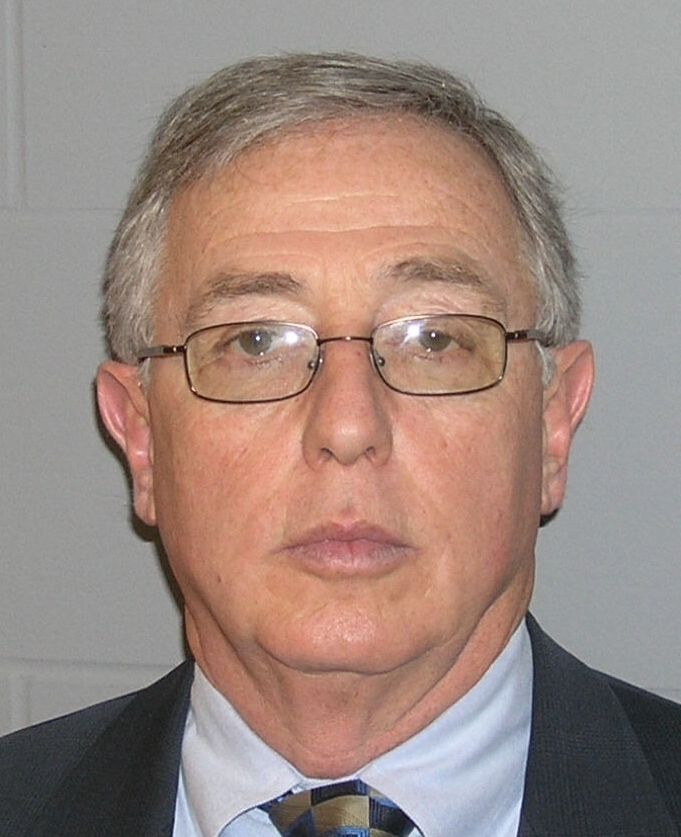
Mark Ciavarella mug shot

On February 18, 2011, following a trial, a federal jury convicted Ciavarella on 12 of the 39 remaining counts he faced including racketeering, a crime in which prosecutors said the former judge used children "as pawns to enrich himself". In convicting Ciavarella of racketeering, the jury agreed with prosecutors that he and Conahan had taken an illegal payment of nearly $1 million from a youth center's builder, then hid the money.

The panel of six men and six women also found Ciavarella guilty of "honest services mail fraud" and of being a tax cheat, for failing to list that money and more on his annual public financial-disclosure forms and on four years of tax returns. In addition, they found him guilty of conspiring to launder money. The jurors acquitted Ciavarella of extortion and bribery in connection with $1.9 million that prosecutors said the judges extracted from the builder and owner of two youth centers, including allegations that Ciavarella shared the proceeds of FedEx boxes that were stuffed with tens of thousands of dollars in cash.

Following Ciavarella's conviction, he and his lawyer appeared on the steps of the courthouse to give an impromptu press conference. The press conference was interrupted by Sandy Fonzo, whose son Edward Kenzakoski committed suicide in June 2010 after Ciavarella adjudicated him to placement, despite Kenzakoski's first-time offender status.

On August 11, 2011, Ciavarella was sentenced to 28 years in federal prison as a result of his conviction. He is currently being held at the Federal Correctional Institution, Ashland, a low-security federal prison in eastern Kentucky. He is scheduled for release on June 18, 2034, when he would be 84 years old. Ciavarella appealed his conviction to the Third Circuit and it was rejected on July 25, 2013.

However, Ciavarella has continued to appeal, contending that the Supreme Court's decision in the case of ex-Governor of Virginia Robert McDonnell narrowed the scope of the honest services fraud statute. On January 9, 2018, federal judge Christopher C. Conner threw out Ciavarella's convictions for racketeering, conspiracy to commit racketeering, and conspiracy to commit money laundering. Conner upheld Ciavarella's contention that his attorneys failed to raise the statute of limitations claims on those charges. He ordered a new trial on those counts, but allowed the honest services fraud convictions to stand. On October 1, 2019, Ciavarella was disbarred on consent from the practice of law by the Commonwealth of Pennsylvania.

On September 23, 2011, Conahan was sentenced to 17 1/2 years in federal prison after pleading guilty to one count of racketeering conspiracy. Due to coronavirus concerns, he was released from prison and placed under home confinement in June 2020, six years early. On December 11, 2024, President Joe Biden commuted Conahan’s sentence as part of the some 1,500 sentences he commuted for those individuals who had been placed under home confinement during the COVID-19 pandemic, stating that such individuals would have received lower sentences under modern sentencing laws, rules, and policies and "have successfully reintegrated into their families and communities and have shown that they deserve a second chance".

On November 4, 2011, Powell was sentenced to 18 months in federal prison after pleading guilty to failing to report a felony and being an accessory to tax conspiracy. He was incarcerated at the Federal Prison Camp, Pensacola, a low-security facility in Florida, and was released from a halfway house on April 16, 2013. On August 10, 2015, a judge approved a $4.75M settlement agreement for Powell, for having paid kickbacks related to the adjudication of at least 2,400 juveniles.

Robert Mericle's sentencing in connection with his guilty plea for failing to report a felony was delayed pending his anticipated testimony in the bribery trial of former Congressman and Pennsylvania State Senator Raphael Musto. On November 23, 2010, a federal grand jury had issued a six-count indictment against Musto, charging him with accepting more than $28,000 from an unnamed company and individual in exchange for his help in obtaining grants and funding. Musto denied any wrongdoing. After Musto died on April 24, 2014, Mericle was sentenced the next day to one year in prison by Senior District Judge Edwin M. Kosik. Mericle was ordered to pay a $250,000 fine and to report to the Federal Bureau of Prisons on May 14, 2014. He was released on May 29, 2015.

== Victim lawsuits ==
Acting under a rarely used power established in 1722 and reserved for extraordinary circumstances, known as "King's Bench jurisdiction", the Pennsylvania Supreme Court appointed Senior Judge Arthur Grim of the Berks County Court of Common Pleas as special master to review all juvenile cases handled by Ciavarella on February 11, 2009. He returned with his findings in an interim report dated March 11, 2009. He recommended that all adjudications handed down by Ciavarella from 2003 to 2008 be vacated, and that the affected juveniles' records be expunged. He concluded that due to Ciavarella's disregard for the juveniles' constitutional rights, as well as the kickbacks, no one who appeared before Ciavarella in that period had a truly impartial hearing. On March 26, 2009, the Supreme Court approved Grim's recommendations and ruled that Ciavarella had violated the constitutional rights of thousands of juveniles, and initially hundreds of juvenile adjudications were ordered overturned.

A class action lawsuit was filed by the Juvenile Law Center on behalf of the juveniles who were adjudicated delinquent by Ciavarella despite not being represented by counsel or advised of their rights. Besides naming Ciavarella and Conahan, the suit seeks damages under the civil portion of the Racketeer Influenced and Corrupt Organizations Act (RICO) against the judges' spouses and business associates, shell companies, youth center officials, and Luzerne County. Three other federal lawsuits filed on behalf of the victims have been consolidated with the Juvenile Law Center lawsuit into a master class action. An amended master complaint was filed on August 28, 2009.

In June 2010, an injunction was filed on behalf of PA Child Care, Western PA Child Care, and Mid Atlantic Youth Services, the companies that provided treatment programs at the youth centers, to prevent the ordered destruction of thousands of juvenile records on the grounds the records are needed for the defense's case.

On July 8, 2013, a three-judge panel of the Third Circuit Court of Appeals ruled in the case of Markel International Insurance Company v. Robert J. Powell, (his business partner) Gregory Zappala, et al., that the insurance company had no obligation to defend or indemnify the individuals or corporations involved, leaving the defendants liable for adverse judgments.

The builder and the owner of the private detention centers, Robert Mericle, settled for payments of about $25 million. On August 17, 2022, U.S. District Judge Christopher Conner issued a verdict requiring that Judges Ciavarella and Conahan pay $106 million in compensatory damages plus $100 million in punitive damages to nearly 300 class members, who were children sent illegally to secure facilities during the scandal, using a base rate of $1,000 per day of wrongful detention.

== Interbranch Commission on Juvenile Justice ==
In the aftermath of the federal charges and defendant pleas, the Pennsylvania General Assembly moved to create a commission to investigate the entire set of circumstances surrounding the miscarriage of justice in Luzerne County. Sponsored by Representative Todd Eachus of Butler Township in Luzerne County, House Bill 1648 established the Interbranch Commission on Juvenile Justice in July 2009. The commission comprises 11 members, appointed from each branch of government in Pennsylvania, with four members chosen by the judiciary, four by the legislature and three by the governor.

In signing the legislation on August 7, 2009, Governor Ed Rendell castigated Ciavarella and Conahan, saying they "violated the rights of as many as 6,000 young people by denying them basic rights to counsel and handing down outrageously excessive sentences. The lives of these young people and their families were changed forever." Scheduled to meet a minimum of once per month, the commission was organized to investigate the actions of and damages caused by the two judges and review the state of the Luzerne County courts left in the wake of their tenures. The commission was given power of subpoena and was required to complete its work and report its recommendations and findings to the three branches of state government by May 31, 2010.

== In popular culture ==
The scandal was featured in Capitalism: A Love Story, the 2009 documentary by Michael Moore. A full-length documentary covering the scandal titled Kids for Cash was released in February 2014, and has been favorably reviewed. Pulitzer Prize–winning investigative journalist William Ecenbarger wrote a well-reviewed book-length exposition of the scandal. In April 2014, CNBC's crime documentary series American Greed reported on the case.

The scandal has inspired several fictional works. The Law & Order: Special Victims Unit episode "Crush", the CSI: NY episode "Crossroads", an episode of The Good Wife, and an episode of For the People feature corrupt and cruel judges sending children to private detention centers partly for financial gain. An episode of Cold Case called "Jurisprudence" is loosely based on this case. The episode of Leverage, titled "The Jailhouse Job" (2010) references this scandal, wherein a prisoner is sentenced to excessive time in a for-profit prison for a minor offense, but uses a young adult as the victim rather than a juvenile. In 2015, crime fiction novelist Ace Atkins, using the pen name of the late Robert B. Parker to write Kickback, which borrows heavily from this case, transposing it into a Boston suburb instead. An episode of Billions called "Quality of Life" has a subplot inspired by the scandal. The novel Corrupted by Lisa Scottoline includes the scandal.

== See also ==
- Judicial corruption
- Prison-industrial complex
- Private prison
- PA Child Care
- School-to-prison pipeline
- Youth incarceration in the United States
