= Juvenile Law Center =

American non-profit public interest law firm

- Formation: 1975
- Founder: Robert Schwartz; Marsha Levick; Judith Chomsky; Philip Margolis
- Founded at: Philadelphia, Pennsylvania
- Type: Non-profit organization
- Purpose: Juvenile justice/child welfare reform
- Key people: Marsha Levick (Chief Legal Officer)

Juvenile Law Center, founded in 1975, is a non-profit public interest law firm for children in the United States.

== History ==
Juvenile Law Center was founded in Philadelphia, Pennsylvania, in 1975 by four Temple University Beasley School of Law graduates: Robert Schwartz, Marsha Levick, Judith Chomsky, and Philip Margolis.

Juvenile Law Center originally operated as a walk-in legal clinic for young people in Philadelphia with legal problems. It grew from a walk-in clinic to a statewide organization and has since grown to a national public interest law firm for children, filing its first brief in the United States Supreme Court in 1983.

Juvenile Law Center played a role in exposing the Luzerne County, Pennsylvania "kids-for-cash" scandal.

On December 20, 2024, Juvenile Law Center announced the appointment of Riya Saha Shah to serve as its new CEO.
