= PRN =

PRN may refer to:

== Computing ==
- PRN:, a printer device name in DOS
- Pseudorandom noise, in cryptography
  - PRN number (PRN ID), an integer determining specific pseudorandom binary sequence

== Medicine ==
- Pertactin (PRN), a virulent factor of the bacterium Bordetella pertussis
- Pro re nata (P.R.N.), Latin for "in the circumstances", prescription jargon
- PRN Forum, a precursor to the Journal of Pain and Symptom Management

== Politics ==
- National Reconstruction Party (Partido da Reconstrução Nacional), Brazil
- National Reorganization Process (Proceso de Reorganización Nacional), Argentina
- Nicaraguan Resistance Party, Nicaragua
- Partido Nacional Revolucionario, Mexico, an Institutional Revolutionary Party precursor
- National People's Party (Indonesia) (Partai Rakyat Nasional), Indonesia

== Radio ==
- Performance Racing Network, an American NASCAR radio network
- Premiere Radio Networks, another American network

== Transport ==
- Pacific RailNews, a defunct American hobbyist magazine
- Paralympic route network, linking Paralympic games venues
- Parton railway station, Cumbria, England
- Pristina International Airport Adem Jashari, Kosovo (IATA:PRN)
- Mac Crenshaw Memorial Airport, Greenville, Alabama, US (FAA LID:PRN)

== Other uses ==
- Packaging Recovery Note, per UK Producer Recovery Obligations
- Praseodymium nitride, a chemical (formula: PrN)
- Premier Retail Networks, a provider of in-store ad screens

== See also ==
- PR:NS (disambiguation)
- Pern (disambiguation)
- Porn (disambiguation)
