= Canton station (Illinois) =

Railroad station in Canton, Illinois, US

Canton
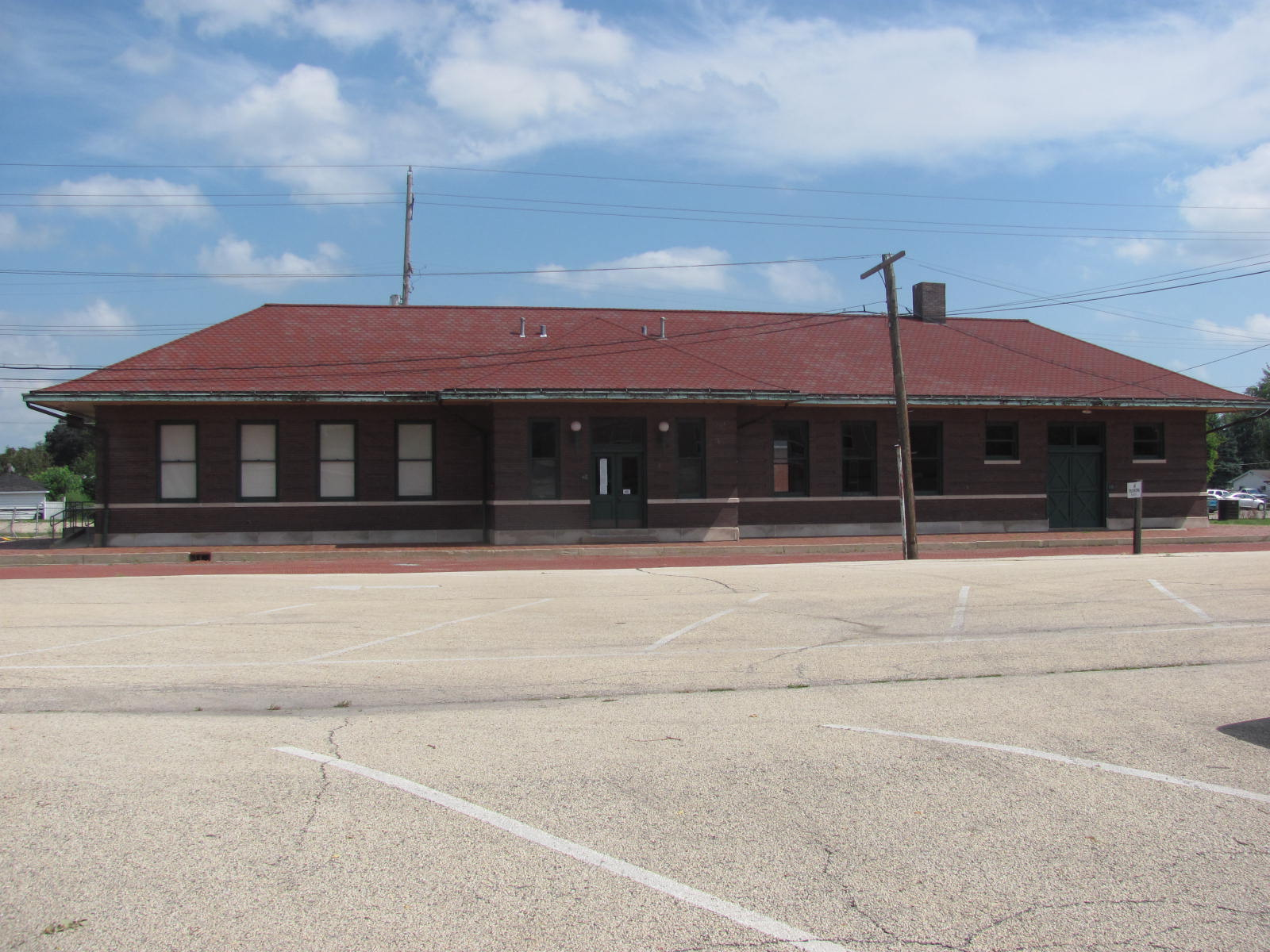
- The depot in 2014

General information
- Location: Along 4th Ave. between E. Elm St. and E. Chestnut St., Canton, Illinois
- Coordinates: 40°33′28″N 90°2′3″W
- System: Former Burlington Route passenger station

History
- Opened: 1914
- Closed: 1961 (passenger); 1980 (freight)

Services
Preceding station	Burlington Route	Following station
Gorman toward St. Louis	St. Louis – Savanna	Norris toward Savanna
- Chicago, Burlington & Quincy Railroad Station
- U.S. National Register of Historic Places
- Location within Illinois Location within the United States
- Location: Along 4th Ave. between E. Elm St. and E. Chestnut St., Canton, Illinois
- Coordinates: 40°33′28″N 90°2′3″W
- Area: less than one acre
- Built: 1914
- Built by: Chicago, Burlington & Quincy Railroad
- Architect: Swift, G.B., & Co.
- NRHP reference No.: 93000842
- Added to NRHP: August 31, 1993
Location

Canton station is a historic Chicago, Burlington and Quincy Railroad station located on 4th Avenue in Canton, Illinois. Built in 1914, the station was the second built by the CB&Q in Canton since it began service to the city in the early 1860s. The CB&Q was one of two railroads to serve Canton, along with the Toledo, Peoria & Western Railroad. As the area had few paved roads at the time, the station was the departure point for the city's business travelers, vacationers, and servicemen in World War I and II. Five passenger trains a day, three during daytime and two at night, served the station in its first decade. The station also served freight trains that exported the area's industrial products, which were mainly farming equipment and coal. The popularity of the passenger trains began to decline as roads became better and more popular; as a result, the night trains were cancelled in 1950 and passenger service to the station ended completely in 1961. Freight service also ended in 1980, at which point the railroad had merged into the Burlington Northern; the city bought the station from the railroad in 1989.

The station was added to the National Register of Historic Places on August 31, 1993, as the Chicago, Burlington & Quincy Railroad Station. It is one four sites on the Register in Canton; the others are the Parlin Library, the Ulysses G. Orendorff House and the Orendorf Site.
