= 1975 Canton, Illinois, tornado =

Tornado event in the United States

Coordinates: 40.55°N 90.03°W

Canton, Illinois tornadoes
Meteorological history
- Formed: July 23, 1975 4:45 p.m.

Tornado outbreak
- Tornadoes: 3
- Maximum rating: F3 tornado

Overall effects
- Fatalities: 2
- Injuries: 69
- Damage: $25 million (1975)
- Areas affected: Central Illinois, especially Canton

The Canton, Illinois Tornadoes of 1975 were destructive tornadoes which occurred as part of a significant severe thunderstorm outbreak concentrated from eastern Iowa across northern and central Illinois on the afternoon and evening of July 23, 1975.

== Outbreak ==
Confirmed tornadoes by Fujita rating
FU	F0	F1	F2	F3	F4	F5	Total
0	1	0	0	2	0	0	3

Widespread significantly severe damaging wind occurred in many areas across eastern Iowa and the northwestern third of Illinois. Many corn fields were flattened, trees were downed, and light structural damage occurred. Power was cut to thousands across the western and northwestern suburbs of Chicago. Around 5:05 pm, a rope-like tornado with multiple funnels was sighted on a farm southwest of Toulon, Illinois, following a left-curving path, before lifting 1 mile (1.6 km) south of Toulon, leaving crop damage. It was rated F0 with a path length of 0.5 miles (0.80 km) and width of 20 yards (18 m). A wind gust of 85 miles per hour (137 km/h) was measured near Peoria and a funnel cloud was spotted at Groveland. Lightning also damaged several houses and buildings. One woman was killed when venturing outside to close her car windows and a six-story International Harvester warehouse was ignited into a large fire in Canton, Illinois.

=== Canton tornadoes ===
The supercell thunderstorm first showed evidence in the damage survey near Bushnell. On several farms, broad convergent and cyclonic crop damage exhibited evidence of the parent tornadocyclone. Trees were uprooted and structural damage varied with windows broken and buildings partially unroofed. A funnel cloud was spotted at 4:01 pm about 3 miles (4.8 km) south of Prairie City.

==== First tornado ====
The first tornado of a complex combination of tornado family and extreme downbursts touched down at 4:30 p.m. about 14 miles (23 km) west of the small city of Canton (or 3 miles (4.8 km) southwest of Blyton) and immediately grew to very large size in agrarian central Fulton County. It continued meandering rural areas with an average movement of easterly roughly near Illinois Route 9 for 11.1 miles (17.9 km) before ending about 3 miles (4.8 km) southeast of Fiatt. A grain elevator was leveled and blown about 0.75 miles (1.21 km) away. Total damages were around $250,000. A University of Chicago team headed by Ted Fujita surveyed the damage path as 1.5 miles (2.4 km) wide at times and suction spot crop damage indicated a multiple vortex tornado.

==== Canton tornado ====
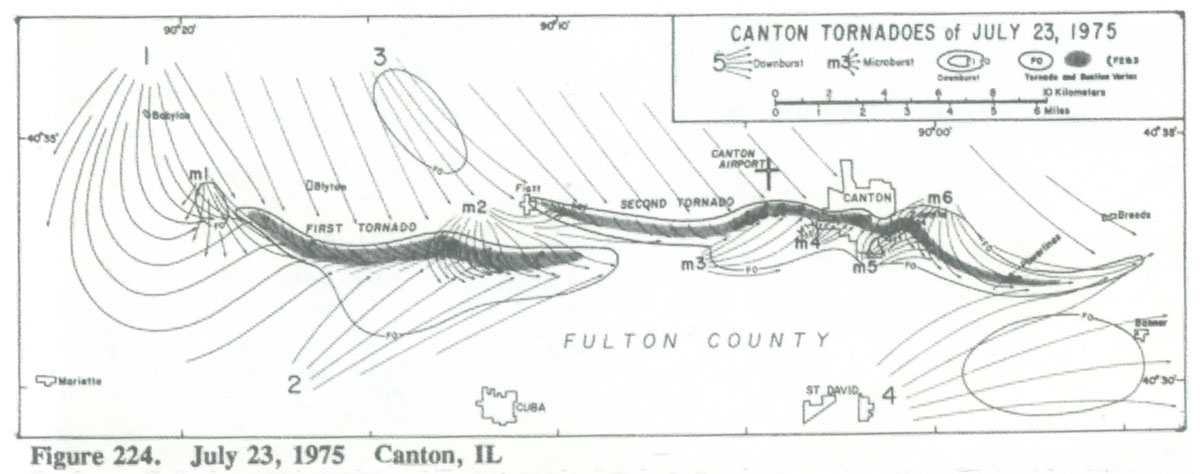
Detailed tornado and downburst track map by Ted Fujita and Gregory S. Forbes.

Before that tornado lifted, a second tornado touched down to the left of the first tornado at 4:45 p.m. on the east side of Fiatt, and it too in conjunction with intense downburst winds proceeded in a meandering path roughly eastward roughly along Route 9. There was no break in the damage because of the proximity of the tornadoes and the accompanying exceptionally intense downburst activity.

This tornado roared into Canton with a damage path 1.5 miles (2.4 km) wide, essentially destroying or heavily damaging the southern half of the town. It devastated much of the downtown area, destroying or damaging 127 businesses concentrated within a five block swath. Many of these buildings were completely destroyed and others were so severely damaged to require razing. The tornado caused heavy residential losses with about 100 frame houses destroyed and an additional 300 damaged; 50 trailers were destroyed and another 100 were damaged. Two people were killed at Horton's Mobile Home Manor on the eastern side of town. Sixty-nine people were injured, of which 14 required hospitalization and 45 were treated and released. Straight-line winds from downbursts inflicted less intense damage across the remainder of town. Total damages amounted to around $25 million (1975 USD). Power was not restored to some areas for a week. The National Guard was deployed, and the damage was so immense and overwhelming that the city was declared a federal disaster area. All stores except for those selling food were forced to close, most perishable food required trashing, and the town was immediately closed to non-residents not on official business.

Farms also suffered substantial damage to crops and buildings with agricultural losses over $3 million. The high-end F3 tornado continued for approximately another 6 miles (9.7 km) to about 1 mile (1.6 km) north of Banner for a total path length of 14 miles (23 km). Total tornado area was 37.5 sq mi (97 km^{2}) with a very high destruction potential index (DPI) – integrating intensity, path length, and width—value of 150.

== Science benefits ==
It was first thought to be a single tornado event of over 25 miles (40 km), but a meticulous damage survey by the renowned severe weather expert Ted Fujita documented the complex interactions of downbursts, microbursts, and tornadoes, and much was learned meteorologically from this event. Downbursts, a recent concept by Fujita at the time (the 1974 Super Outbreak the year before was also significant in their conceptual development), covered a very large area; these as well as a continuous series of smaller but very intense microbursts were responsible for the meandering course of the tornadoes (although the average of the path was linear) and for some changes in intensity. It is thought that a microburst may be responsible for breaking up the first tornado. A continuous damage swath connected the events regardless. Conversely, another microburst seems to have caused the tornado to intensify on the eastern side of Canton and coincided with the two deaths. The most intense pure tornadic damage width was 0.5 miles (0.80 km).

== 1835 Canton tornado ==
Canton and surrounding areas were devastated by an earlier tornado on June 18, 1835. Touching down around 10 p.m., it decimated rural farms, killing four; before it traversed through Canton, killing four in town, including the town's founder and his young son. Injuries totaled forty. This tornado damaged or destroyed about fifty buildings in Canton with a total damage width of about 0.25 miles (0.40 km).

== See also ==
- List of North American tornadoes and tornado outbreaks
- Rear flank downdraft and forward flank downdraft
