= Orendorf Site =

Archaeological site in Illinois, United States

- U.S. National Register of Historic Places
- Location within Illinois
- Location: Fulton County, Illinois
- Nearest city: Canton
- Coordinates: 40°29′15″N 89°57′6″W
- Area: 40 acres (16 ha)
- NRHP reference No.: 77000484
- Added to NRHP: September 13, 1977

The Orendorf Site is a prehistoric archaeological site located near the city of Canton, Fulton County, Illinois. The site includes four distinct areas of Middle Mississippian settlement; the settlement area was one of seven major sites in the Spoon River tradition. The four settlement sites within the larger site came as the result of a single village relocating multiple times; this movement became useful to archaeologists, as artifacts from different periods are spread out rather than mixed together at a single site. The settlement functioned as a regional center within the Spoon River culture, making it a hub in its hierarchal political organization and part of many important trade routes. Trade and migration linked the settlement to the large Mississippian city of Cahokia; while the settlement's culture had much in common with Cahokian culture, it was also a distinct regional culture in its own right.

The site was added to the National Register of Historic Places on September 13, 1977. It is one of four sites on the Register in Canton, along with the Ulysses G. Orendorff House, the Parlin Library and the Chicago, Burlington & Quincy Railroad Station.

== See also ==
- List of archaeological sites on the National Register of Historic Places in Illinois
