= Premier Retail Networks =

Premier Retail Networks or "PRN" is a wholly owned subsidiary of Stratacache. It programs, broadcasts and sells advertising on video screens, health kiosks and television displays inside retail locations. PRN was known as IZ-ON Media (pronounced "Eyes on Media") from October 1, 2012 to October 7, 2015.

== Services ==
PRN programs and operates three different retail media networks; the HDTV Network, the Health and Wellness Network and the Checkout TV® Network. Each Digital Place-based Media Network plays a looping video program that combines entertainment content, retailer programming and advertising.

The Checkout TV® Network plays on screens located over the checkout stands in Walmart stores. Intended for viewing by customers in line for checkout, the network plays short-form programming and commercials. Ads are typically for items that are available at or near the checkout area or may be purchased on a return trip.

The HDTV Network can be seen in wholesale clubs, such as Costco. The programming is displayed on the HDTV televisions that are on display for sale, often in front of the store. In retail stores, such as Target, the televisions are located in the electronics department. Shoppers browsing these televisions see HD content from media partners, like VH1, as well as paid commercial spots that advertise products sold inside the store or club. The HDTV Network inside BJ's Wholesale Club stores include BJ's Radio, which plays music, announcements, and advertising in-club.

The Health and Wellness Network began in April 2013 when IZ-ON Media became the ad sales representative for the Stayhealthy network. Stayhealthy was a national network of connected health kiosks (located near the pharmacy department) in grocery and drug stores. Customers can track their blood pressure, weight and body fat as well as conduct vision tests. Advertising is sold for and displayed on a larger "attract screen" that faces the store as well as on the personal screen while a person waits for his/her test results. IZ-ON Media's Health and Wellness Network tripled in size when Stayhealthy merged with higi, another national health kiosk chain, in August 2014. The combined higi network can be found in grocery and drug store chains such as Kroger, Albertsons, Publix, Ahold and Rite Aid.

== History ==
Founded in 1992, the company has serviced many venues, including, Sam's Club, Best Buy, SUPERVALU, Sears, Fry's Marketplace, ShopRite, Pathmark, and all locations serviced by Indoor Direct.

On June 30, 2015, Stratacache acquired IZ-ON Media from Technicolor SA and restored the original PRN name on October 7, 2015.
