= HURN =

HURN is a four-letter acronym that may refer to:

- Huron Consulting Group (NYSE: HURN)
- Hurn, a village in southeast Dorset, England
  - RAF Hurn, military base nearby, now
    - Bournemouth Airport
