= Black v. United States =

- Supreme Court of the United States

Argued December 8, 2009 Decided June 24, 2010
- Full case name: Conrad M. Black, John A. Boultbee, and Mark S. Kipnis v. United States
- Docket no.: 08-876
- Citations: 561 U.S. 465 (more) 130 S. Ct. 2963; 177 L. Ed. 2d 695

Case history
- Prior: United States v. Black, 530 F.3d 596 (7th Cir. 2008)

Holding
- Remanded for reconsideration in light of Skilling v. United States. By properly objecting to the honest-services jury instructions at trial, the defendants secured their right to challenge those instructions on appeal.

Court membership
- Chief Justice John Roberts Associate Justices John P. Stevens · Antonin Scalia; Anthony Kennedy · Clarence Thomas; Ruth Bader Ginsburg · Stephen Breyer; Samuel Alito · Sonia Sotomayor

Case opinions
- Majority: Ginsburg, joined by Roberts, Stevens, Breyer, Alito, Sotomayor
- Concurrence: Scalia (in part), joined by Thomas
- Concurrence: Kennedy (in part)

Laws applied
- 18 U.S.C. § 1346

Black v. United States, 561 U.S. 465 (2010), is a white-collar criminal law case decided by the United States Supreme Court dealing with businessman Conrad Black's fraud trial. Along with two companion cases—Skilling v. United States and Weyhrauch v. United States—it dealt with the honest services provision, 18 U.S.C. § 1346.

== Probe against Hollinger Inc. ==
In May 2003, following shareholder complaints, a special committee appointed by Hollinger International directors began an investigation of internal financial management, including compensation and fees paid directly and indirectly to Black's associates at Ravelston, a holding company. In particular, New York investment firm Tweedy, Browne, which had an 18% stake in Hollinger International, demanded the company probe what it alleged to be excessive payments to Conrad Black and David Radler, and demanded "disgorgement" of the funds paid.

For example, in 2000, in an arrangement that came to be known as the "Lerner Exchange," Black acquired Chicago's Lerner Newspapers and sold it to Hollinger. The special committee's report contained allegations of impropriety which led to a criminal investigation and, ultimately, the unraveling of the Hollinger media empire.

Black attempted to sell the controlling interest in Hollinger to British businessmen David and Frederick Barclay. The Hollinger board of directors successfully sued to halt Black's proposed transaction, though subsequent events demonstrated that the Barclays' publicly disclosed offer of $18 per share was several times higher than the share price ultimately obtained for the sale of the Hollinger assets.

In November 2003, Black resigned as chief executive of Hollinger. By January 2004 the board of directors of Hollinger obtained Black's resignation as chairman. Hollinger International filed a $200 million (USD) lawsuit against Black, David Radler and their associated companies.

== Background: earlier civil matters ==
Black was called before the U.S. Securities and Exchange Commission in December 2003 but he refused to answer questions about business dealings, citing his Fifth Amendment right against self-incrimination.

In May 1998, American Trucker Magazine (ATM) was sold by Southam (see also Hollinger International Inc.) in a bundled transaction including a daily circulation Western Canada newspaper for $93,672,000. The purchase and sale agreement provided for the payment by the purchaser of a $2.0 million non-competition fee to the Company. The Company failed to disclose that on February 1, 1999, approximately eight months after the sale closed, the Company transferred funds equivalent to the non-competition fee to Hollinger Inc. This transaction played a part in the trial.

In February 2004, Delaware judge Leo E. Strine, Jr. barred the Barclays sale and wrote in his judgment, "Black breached his fiduciary and contractual duties persistently and seriously... I found Black evasive and unreliable. His explanations of key events and of his own motivations do not have the ring of truth". Strine, however, also wrote that "another reasonable mind might draw different conclusions" regarding these findings of fact.

In August 2004, a special committee of the Board of Directors of Hollinger International Inc. made a report of investigation to the U.S. Securities and Exchange Commission and the U.S. District Court. The special committee was headed by Richard Breeden, a former SEC Chairman who was paid approximately $100,000 (USD) per week for his work. The report, which became known as the "Breeden Report" and which cost Hollinger International over $50 million (USD), alleged that Black and associates had without proper authorization taken cash and other assets and benefits from Hollinger and had breached their fiduciary duties to Hollinger's public majority, non-controlling shareholders.

In November 2004, the SEC filed civil fraud lawsuits against Black and several others, alleging the defendants cheated and defrauded shareholders through a series of deceptive schemes and misstatements.

== Criminal case ==
One year later, eight criminal fraud charges were brought by the Chicago U. S. Attorney against Black and three former Hollinger executives. The U.S. Attorney laid four new charges against Black on 15 December 2005, alleging racketeering, obstruction of justice, money laundering, mail fraud, tax evasion and wire fraud. Under the racketeering count, the government sought forfeiture of more than $92,000,000 (USD). The obstruction count related to Black and his chauffeur removing boxes of documents from Hollinger offices in Toronto on June 9, 2005, contrary to a court order that prohibited removal. Black contested the obstruction count on the grounds that he was obeying an eviction notice, that he knew he was being filmed because he had installed the security cameras which filmed him, that he had already provided copies of every document prosecutors had asked for, and that not a single commercially relevant document in those boxes was not already possessed by prosecutors.

The criminal fraud trial of Black and three other Hollinger International executives commenced on 14 March 2007.

=== Verdict and sentence ===
After twelve days of deliberation, on 13 July 2007, the jury found Black guilty of three counts of mail and wire fraud and one count of obstruction of justice and acquitted him of nine other charges, including wire fraud and racketeering. The fraud convictions related to money taken by the executives in exchange for their agreements to not compete with various Hollinger units. Prosecutors claimed these were fraudulent agreements. Co-accused, Peter Y. Atkinson, John A. Boultbee and Mark Kipnis, were each found guilty of mail and wire fraud (David Radler had already pleaded guilty to fraud).

On November 5, 2007, Judge Amy St. Eve denied Black's motion for a new trial. On December 10, 2007, Black was sentenced to 78 months in jail. Twelve weeks later, the Court of Appeals denied his motion to remain free on bail while appealing his convictions. Black requested to be housed in a minimum security prison camp near Miami but the Bureau of Prisons denied his request and instead ordered him to report to Coleman Federal Correctional Complex near Orlando, Florida on March 3, 2008, to begin serving his sentence. Prior to his being granted bail, Black's projected release date was in October 2013.

== Reaction and consequences ==
Black told journalists he would continue his "long war" against the charges and said "any conviction is unsatisfactory". After the verdicts, Black's Canadian lawyer Edward Greenspan said, "The heart of their case was lost." However, former federal prosecutor and SEC enforcement lawyer Jacob Frenkel called it a "stunning victory" for the government and explained how a split verdict "highlights for the appellate court that the jury was very thoughtful and thorough in its deliberations."

Investigators hired by Hollinger companies to locate assets examined more than forty bank accounts which may be, or may have been, held in the name of Black, his wife, or affiliated entities. According to court filings, Ravelston Corp. also had a subsidiary in Barbados called Argent News Inc. and another in Bermuda called Sugra Bermuda Ltd. A report by a special committee of the board of Hollinger International Inc. said Black co-owned two Barbados companies, Moffat Management Inc. and Black-Amiel Management Inc., which both received millions of dollars in payments, the former allegedly owned by Black and his co-defendants, and the latter by Black, his wife and Boultbee. In November 2007, Sun-Times Media Group (formerly Hollinger) said in a regulatory filing that it had spent $107.7 million on legal fees and indemnification costs for criminal and civil actions involving Black, Boultbee, Kipniss and Atkinson.

After the verdict, New Democratic Party of Canada Member of Parliament Charlie Angus publicly called for Black's expulsion from the Queen's Privy Council for Canada and for his removal from the Order of Canada. The Toronto Star similarly called for then-Governor General Michaëlle Jean to remove Black from the Order. Canadian Prime Minister Stephen Harper stated that Black would have to go through regular channels to attempt to regain his Canadian citizenship, that membership in the Order of Canada is the purview of the Governor General and that decisions about the Privy Council would only take place after the legal process, including appeal, had been completed.

Black's ability to re-enter Canada is uncertain unless he obtains dispensation from the Canadian government. Were he to regain residency, "Canadian citizenship can't be granted to those who are criminally inadmissible and neither the minister nor the Governor in Council (cabinet) can override that," according to an immigration department spokesperson. The loss of his Canadian citizenship also makes it impossible for Black to be transferred to a Canadian prison where he would be eligible for parole much sooner than if he were to serve time in the United States.

== Appeal ==
Black's oral arguments were heard June 5, 2008, by a three-judge panel of the United States Court of Appeals for the Seventh Circuit. Andrew Frey argued that Black and his co-defendants did not steal from Hollinger when they authorized individual non-competition payments. Frey asserted that the monies were "management fees" and that Hollinger International shareholders were not hurt by the payments. Appeals judge Richard Posner said, "The bulk of the evidence [in the Hollinger case] has to do with pretty naked fraud." Posner was skeptical about defense arguments that Black did not obstruct justice by removing boxes from his Toronto office, commenting, "The timing was bizarre, the removal of the documents in the middle of an investigation." Three weeks later, on June 25, 2008, the 7th Circuit Court of Appeals affirmed the convictions. and rejected all of the arguments raised by the defense. The circuit court found that "the evidence established a conventional fraud, that is, a theft of money or other property from Hollinger by misrepresentations and misleading omissions..." The panel affirmed the jury's findings stating that, "It is not as if Black had merely been using his power as controlling shareholder to elect a rubber-stamp board of directors or to approve a merger favorable to him at the expense of the minority shareholders ... He was acting in his capacity as the CEO of Hollinger when he ordered (Mark) Kipnis to draft the covenants not to compete and when he duped the audit committee and submitted a false 10-K." Black, for his part, maintained the form in question was simply improperly, and not falsely, submitted.

Prosecutor Eric Sussman replied to news of the initial appeal decision saying, "I think at some point in time Mr. Black needs to take a hard look in the mirror and ask who it is that really doesn't understand the conduct that took place in this case…You've got 16 people who have taken a look at the facts and the law in a very detailed and time-consuming way, and they have all reached the same conclusion, which is that he stole money from this company and he tried to obstruct the investigation."

Black added Harvard professor Alan Dershowitz to his law team and asked the 7th Circuit Court to reconsider the appeal decision without success. In June 2008, he ruled out trying to obtain a presidential pardon from George W. Bush, though he later applied for one in November of the same year. The final acts of clemency of Bush's presidency were announced on his last full day of office, January 19, 2009. Black's name was not included in the list of commuted sentences.

The US Supreme Court heard an appeal of Black's fraud conviction on 8 December 2009. Black's application for bail pending his appeal was turned down by the Supreme Court and subsequently by Judge St. Eve of the US District Court.

The Supreme Court only reviewed Black's fraud convictions and did not reconsider his conviction for obstruction of justice for which he received a sentence concurrent with his sentence for fraud; thus, even a successful appeal would not necessarily have resulted in a reduction of his prison sentence. Eric Sussman, Black's prosecutor in the Chicago trial, told the Toronto Star that the Supreme Court's rejection of Black's bail request means that the "Supreme Court is confident that no matter what happens he's still going to be serving six-and-a-half years for obstruction of justice" regardless of the outcome of his appeal.

On June 24, 2010, the U.S. Supreme Court released its 9–0 decision ordering the 7th circuit court, which had upheld Black's conviction at trial, to review its own decision regarding the three fraud convictions against Black in light of the Supreme Court's construction of the honest services fraud statute in Skilling v. United States. Writing for the Court, Justice Ginsburg was critical of Judge Posner's decision, referring to its "anomalous" ruling and the "judicial invention" found therein. The appeal court was instructed to review Black's case and determine whether his fraud convictions should stand or if there should be a new trial. Black's obstruction of justice conviction remained in place. Black's lawyers filed an application for bail pending the appeal court's review, which prosecutors contested, arguing in court papers that Black's trial jury had proof that Black committed fraud. On July 19, 2010, Black was granted bail pending a decision by the court on whether to retry his 2008 criminal fraud conviction. He was released on July 21, 2010, on a $2 million bond signed by Roger Hertog.

On October 28, 2010, the U.S. 7th Circuit Court of Appeals overturned two of the three remaining mail fraud counts. It left Black convicted of one count of mail fraud, of which his portion was $285,000 (USD), and one count of obstruction of justice. The court also ruled that he must be resentenced. On December 17, 2010, Black lost an appeal of his remaining convictions for fraud and obstruction of justice. The three-person panel did not provide reasons. On May 31, 2011, the Supreme Court of the United States refused to grant Black leave to appeal his two remaining convictions without any comment. Resentencing on the two remaining counts by the original trial judge occurred on June 24, 2011. Black's lawyers recommended that he be sentenced to the 29 months he has already served, while the prosecution argued for Black to complete his original 6 1/2-year sentence. The probation officer's report recommends a sentence of between 33 and 41 months. On that date, Judge St. Eve resentenced him to a reduced term of 42 months and a fine of $150,000 returning him to prison to serve the remaining 13 months of his sentence.

Black did not return to his former location of Coleman Federal Correctional Facility because two female guards at Coleman reported they feared for their safety if Black returned. Instead, he reported on September 6, 2011, to the Federal Correctional Institution, Miami. He was released from prison on May 4, 2012. Although he has given up his Canadian citizenship in 2001 in order to receive British peerage, he has expressed desire to live in Canada after his prison term completed. He was granted a one-year temporary resident permit to live in Canada in March 2012 when he was still serving his sentence. Critics denounced that Black received special treatment from the Canadian government but Stephen Harper, the Prime Minister, denied any political influence. Upon his release from the prison, Black was immediately picked up by the U.S. Immigration officials and was escorted to the Miami International Airport. He arrived at Toronto on the same afternoon and returned to his home for the first time in nearly five years.

On February 19, 2013, Black's motion to vacate his guilty verdict was dismissed.

== Time in prison ==
Black, Federal Bureau of Prisons #18330-424, was incarcerated at Coleman Federal Correctional Complex near Orlando, Florida for 28 months from March 3, 2008, until he was released on July 21, 2010.

On August 23, 2008, Black authored a piece in the National Post about the experience of prison. He repeated his assertion that he had been wrongly convicted and asserted: "The bunk about a lavish lifestyle was disbelieved and rejected by the jury." He believes that time will show the Canadian and American justice systems were disgraced by his conviction, not him. He adds, "But someone has to resist the putrification of justice in these jurisdictions, and if someone of my means doesn't, who will?"

In 2008 Black wrote to the Canadian Press, commenting that, "I am doing fine. This (prison) is a safe and civilized place, and I don't anticipate any difficulty."

After being promoted from his initial prison job as a dishwasher, he taught high school level classes in American history helping a dozen prisoners earn their high school diplomas. Black was nicknamed "Lordy" by his fellow convicts, a reference to his membership in the UK aristocratic nobility.

== See also ==
- List of United States Supreme Court cases, volume 561
