= AnneElise Goetz =

American attorney, TV legal analyst and media personality

- Born: Dayton, Ohio, U.S.
- Education: University of Wisconsin–Madison, Case Western Reserve University
- Occupations: Lawyer; TV Legal Analyst; Social commentator
- Notable credit(s): Dr. Drew On Call legal analyst (2015–Present), Crime Watch Daily, Access Hollywood

AnneElise Goetz is an American attorney, TV legal analyst and media personality.

She is a recurring legal analyst and business consultant on Dr. Drew On Call and Crime Watch Daily, and frequents the Plugged In segment of Access Hollywood Live, providing social commentary.

In 2016, Goetz was named a Forward Under 40, an award bestowed by her alma mater, the University of Wisconsin–Madison.

Goetz received her bachelor's degree in political science from the University of Wisconsin–Madison and her J.D. degree from Case Western Reserve University School of Law, in Cleveland, Ohio. She was a recipient of the Young Attorney Award in 2012 and 2013 and, in 2015, received the Best of the Bar Award.

Goetz is a partner at Higgs Fletcher & Mack. She specializes in real estate, finance and healthcare law.

== Television work ==
From 2013 to 2015, Goetz appeared weekly on One America News Network's The Daily Ledger, as the show's legal consultant.

In 2014, she became a weekly panelist on Dr. Drew On Call.

In 2016, she began contributing on the Wild About Trial segments on Crime Watch Daily and the Plugged In segment of Access Hollywood Live, alongside host Billy Bush.

== Personal life ==
Goetz lives with her husband in San Diego, California. The two run a small real estate business and have two children together.
