= Ulysses G. Orendorff House =

Historic house - United States - Redcrest - Orendorff - Walters - Wrigley

- U.S. National Register of Historic Places
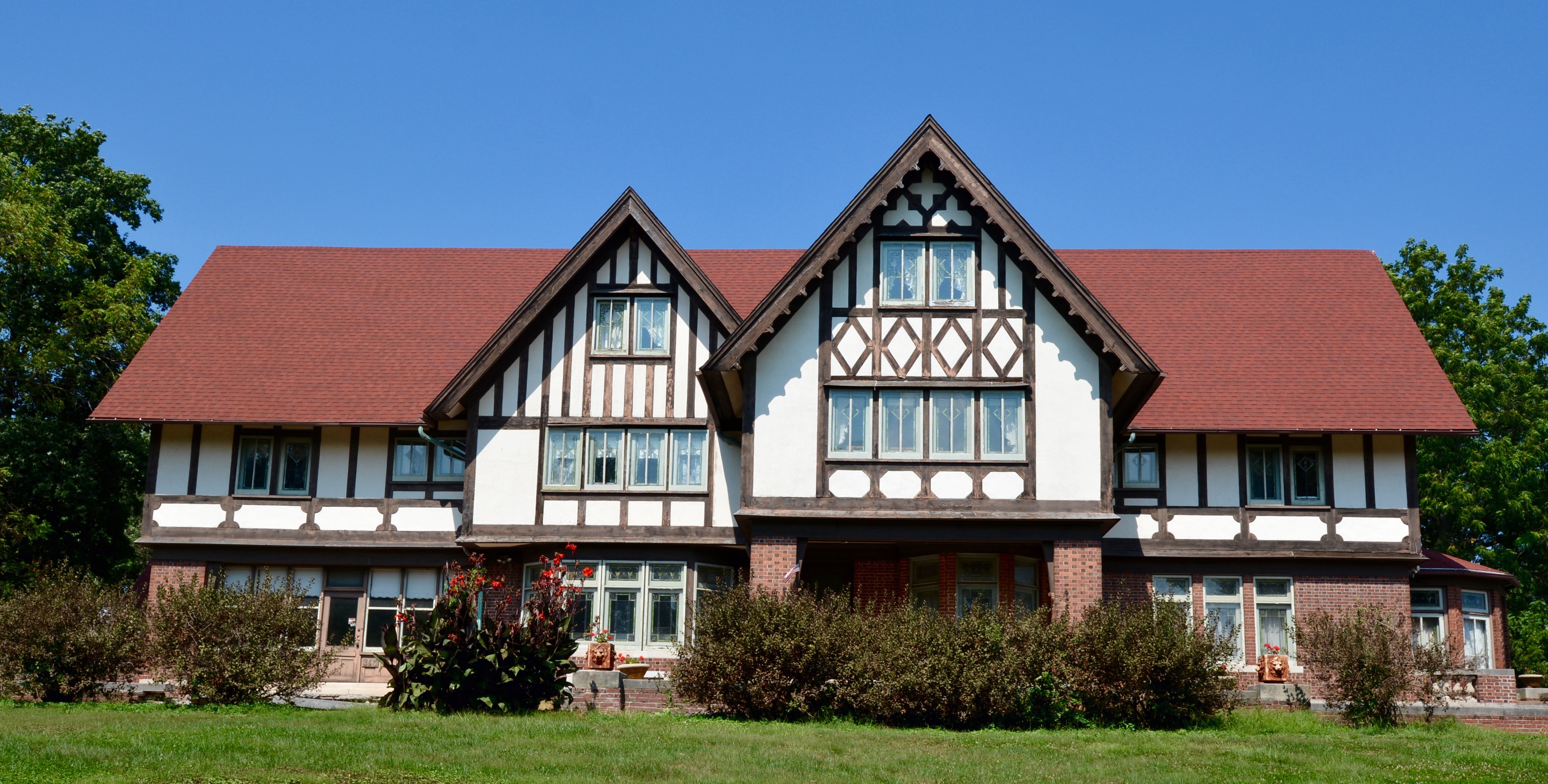

- Location within Illinois Location within the United States
- Interactive map showing the location of Ulysses G. Orendorff House
- Location: 345 W. Elm St., Canton, Illinois
- Coordinates: 40°33′28″N 90°2′3″W
- Area: 9.9 acres (4.0 ha)
- Built: 1902
- Architect: Spencer, Robert C.
- Architectural style: Prairie School
- NRHP reference No.: 71000292
- Added to NRHP: December 9, 1971

The Ulysses G. Orendorff House is a historic house located at 345 West Elm Street in Canton, Illinois. The house was built in 1902 for Ulysses G. Orendorff, the son of Parlin & Orendorff co-founder W. J. Orendorff; the company, the most successful in Canton, manufactured farming equipment and was later sold to International Harvester. The home is commonly known as "Redcrest" and has an official U.S. mailing address of same.

Architect Robert C. Spencer of Chicago designed the house; Spencer was a apprentice of Frank Lloyd Wright and an early figure in the Prairie School, and the house represents Spencer's shift toward the Prairie School aesthetic from his earlier Tudor style works. Two large gables on the front of the house are decorated with a wooden grid with rows of windows and geometric patterns; while the design resembles half-timbering on its face, it embodies the horizontal emphasis that became a key feature of the Prairie School. The interior of the house is characteristic of the Prairie School, with natural materials and modern decorative elements.

The home was purchased by Eddie D. Walters and his wife Alma K. Wrigley Walters in 1962. The couple owned the property until 1980 when it was sold to their son Micheal W. Walters. He and his wife Susan (née' McPherson) resided there with their two sons, Chris and Cade, until 2002. The property also includes a carriage house with a full basketball court, 18 hole miniature "putt-putt" professionally designed golf course, batting cage, and a six car garage.

The house was added to the National Register of Historic Places on December 9, 1971. It is one of four sites on the Register in Canton, along with the Chicago, Burlington & Quincy Railroad Station, the Parlin Library and the Orendorf Site.
