= American Trucker Magazine =

Magazine which began in 1977 as Mother Trucker News

American Trucker began in 1977, as a Newsprint, loose page fold-over, called Mother Trucker News. The publishers were two friends, Steve Kreger and Bud Feldkamp who met while students at Loma Linda University in San Bernardino, California. As of December 2017, the magazine is mailed to 150,000 qualified subscribers each month.

== Overview ==
In the mid 1980s, American Trucker Magazine (ATM) had a circulation of well over 100,000. The magazine was sold in more than 150 truck stops across the United States. Many of the truck stops that sold ATM were concentrated in the West, Midwest, on across Interstate 80 through Pennsylvania and New York. The biggest concentration of participating truck stops were across the southern states from California east through Arizona, New Mexico, through Texas, Louisiana, Mississippi, Alabama, Tennessee, Georgia and Florida.

== Sell out ==
In May 1998, American Trucker Magazine (ATM) was sold by Southam (see also Hollinger International Inc.) in a bundled transaction including a daily circulation Western Canada newspaper for $93,672,000. The purchase and sale agreement provided for the payment by the purchaser of a $2.0 million non-competition fee to the Company. The Company failed to disclose that on February 1, 1999, approximately eight months after the sale closed, the Company transferred funds equivalent to the non-competition fee to Hollinger Inc. This transaction played a part in the trial of Hollinger Chairman, Conrad Black and three executives.

== See also ==
- Truck-driving country
- Great West Truck Show
