= McDonnell v. United States =

- Supreme Court of the United States

Argued April 27, 2016 Decided June 27, 2016
- Full case name: Robert F. McDonnell, Petitioner v. United States
- Docket no.: 15-474
- Citations: 579 U.S. 550 (more) 136 S. Ct. 2355; 195 L. Ed. 2d 639
- Opinion announcement: Opinion announcement

Case history
- Prior: United States v. McDonnell, 64 F. Supp. 3d 783 (E.D. Va. 2014); affirmed, 792 F.3d 478 (4th Cir. 2015); cert. granted, 136 S. Ct. 891 (2016).

Holding
- An "official act" within the federal bribery statutes does not include merely setting up a meeting, calling another public official, or hosting an event.

Court membership
- Chief Justice John Roberts Associate Justices Anthony Kennedy · Clarence Thomas; Ruth Bader Ginsburg · Stephen Breyer; Samuel Alito · Sonia Sotomayor; Elena Kagan

Case opinion
- Majority: Roberts, joined by unanimous

Laws applied
- Hobbs Act, Honest services fraud

McDonnell v. United States, 579 U.S. 550 (2016), was a United States Supreme Court case concerning the appeal of former Virginia Governor Robert F. McDonnell's conviction for honest services fraud and Hobbs Act extortion. At issue on appeal was whether the definition of "official act" within the federal bribery statutes encompassed the actions for which McDonnell had been convicted and whether the jury had been properly instructed on this definition at trial.

In light of the Court's findings, U.S. District Judge T. S. Ellis III of Virginia dropped seven of 10 charges for which former Representative William J. Jefferson of New Orleans was convicted in 2012. He ordered him released from prison on October 5, 2017, pending a new sentence or action from the government.

== Case background ==
Anatabloc is a tobacco extract which the company Star Scientific was producing in Virginia. Virginia has been a tobacco-producing state. The governor held events promoting the company's product at his governor's mansion after receiving gifts from the CEO of the company.

At the trial in the United States District Court for the Eastern District of Virginia, prosecutors charged Robert F. McDonnell and his wife with quid pro quo. The jury found the McDonnells guilty of multiple counts of corruption. James R. Spencer presided over the initial trial.

The United States Court of Appeals for the Fourth Circuit unanimously affirmed the convictions of the McDonnells.

== Opinion of the Court ==
Chief Justice John Roberts authored the unanimous opinion. McDonnell's conviction was vacated on the grounds that the meaning of "official act" does not include merely setting up a meeting, calling another public official, or hosting an event.

== Impact ==
=== Narrowed definition of bribery ===
The ruling narrowed the legal definition of public corruption and made it harder for prosecutors to prove that a political official engaged in bribery. The term "official act" does not occur in the statutes charged in the case; rather, the parties to the trial had agreed that they would use the definition of that term given in the federal bribery statute 18 U.S.C. § 201(a)(3) in interpreting those statutes. Thus, by construing the term narrowly the Supreme Court narrowed the definition of bribery.

According to Bloomberg News, the ruling "appears to have opened the floodgates for reversals of high-profile public corruption cases, including William Jefferson, a former Louisiana congressman. Former New York State Assembly Speaker Sheldon Silver; Dean Skelos, a former majority leader of the New York state senate; and Skelos’s son, Adam Skelos, have since had corruption convictions overturned on similar grounds."

=== Legal citations ===
The ruling in the Supreme Court case was cited by United States District Court for the District of New Jersey as potential grounds for dismissing the 2017 bribery charges in another federal case against United States Senator Bob Menendez of New Jersey. The charges were not dismissed, but the case ended in a mistrial, with most of the jurors favoring acquittal.

In the aftermath of the Kids for cash scandal, former President Judge Mark Ciavarella of the Luzerne County Court of Common Pleas has also cited the Supreme Court ruling in an attempt to overturn his own twenty-eight year sentence in federal prison. The basis for citing the ruling is that it altered the definition of an official act for the crime of bribery. Judge Thomas L. Ambro of the U.S. Court of Appeals for the Third Circuit rejected Ciavarella's appeal. In his opinion, Judge Ambro stated that "Ciavarella’s bribery-related actions still satisfy even a post-McDonnell understanding of ‘official act.’ If sentencing hundreds of juvenile offenders to excessive terms of incarceration is not an ‘official act,’ then nothing is.”

== See also ==
- Honest services fraud
- Skilling v. United States (2010)
- Supreme Court of the United States § Ethics
