= Louisa McCall =

Louisa McCall (1824-1907), born in London as Louisa Raymond, emigrated to the United States in 1835 with her family and settled in Illinois. She spent most of her life in Canton, Illinois, and is best known for serving as one of the first female finance executives in the United States. She served as director of the First National Bank of Canton from 1877 until her death in 1907, and as Vice President of the bank from 1899 until her death.

== Banking ==
During the years prior to the American Civil War, U.S. banking was a largely unregulated profession. Banks were not government-inspected for financial probity and could issue their own paper currency. Other businesses, such as the distillation of alcoholic liquor, were also unregulated. In 1861-1865, as part of the Civil War, the Lincoln Administration adopted a sharply different policy. To control alcohol consumption and raise money to fight the war, distillers were heavily inspected and made to pay a substantial federal tax. Banks were strongly encouraged to seek a charter as a "national bank" in their communities. The Lincoln Administration took steps, under the table, to steer banking charters and distillery licenses to their friends in the Republican Party. Strongly Republican, the city of Peoria and its central-Illinois environs became a hub of the banking and distilling industries.

This was good news for Peoria's James Harvey McCall and Louisa Raymond McCall, who had married in 1845. In 1862, the couple saw an opportunity to become ground-floor participants as the Peoria area moved into a new business paradigm. The couple and their family moved to a nearby town, Canton, to operate a distillery. Soon, the couple helped start up a national bank to serve Canton. The bank was chartered in 1864 and was successful, but in 1873 James McCall died. After some litigation, Louisa McCall was left with a substantial fortune, including a major equity stake in her hometown bank. In 1877 the First National Bank of Canton elected the widow to be a bank director. She is believed to be the first female director of a bank in United States financial history.

Louisa McCall maintained her stake and her active participation in bank affairs. Her colleagues elected her Vice-President of the bank in 1899, thus extending her status as a financial pioneer. By this time Canton had become a small industrial city with a substantial presence in coal mining and farm machinery, and the First National Bank of Canton had survived through a long list of financial panics and economic recessions. McCall continued as Vice President and director of the First National Bank of Canton until her death on January 11, 1907.

== See also ==
- Maggie L. Walker, 1902 banking pioneer
