= Michael W. Ferro Jr. =

American businessman and tech entrepreneur

- Born: 1966 (age 59–60); Merrick, New York, United States
- Education: University of Illinois at Chicago
- Occupations: Founder & CEO of Merrick Ventures
- Known for: Founder of Click Commerce and Higi; Former non-executive chairman of Tribune Publishing
- Spouse: Jacqueline J. Ferro (m. 1996)

Michael W. Ferro Jr. (born 1966) is an American businessman and tech entrepreneur, founder of Click Commerce and Higi, as well as several other companies including Merrick Ventures, a Chicago-based private equity firm. From February 2016 to March 2018, he was the non-executive chairman of Tribune Publishing, one of the largest newspaper publishers in the United States.

Ferro founded Click Commerce in 1994 and took it public in 2000 before its sale to Illinois Tool Works in 2006. A multiple patent holder for medical diagnostic imaging, in 2008, Ferro acquired a stake in Merge Healthcare, a medical data and imaging company, and served as its chairman until its acquisition by IBM in 2016. In 2012, he founded Higi, a company that produces biometric screening stations. From 2011 until early 2016, he served as the chairman of Wrapports, which owns the Chicago Sun-Times.

== Early life and education ==
Michael W. Ferro Jr. was born in 1966 in Merrick, New York, to Onna M. (née Zupo) and Michael W. Ferro. When Michael Jr. was 15 years old, the family moved to suburban Chicago, Illinois. Ferro earned a degree in psychology from the University of Illinois at Chicago (UIC) in 1989.

== Career ==
While attending high school, Ferro started his first company, Chem Roof, a roof sealant business. He continued to develop and operate the company full-time while attending UIC. In 1992, Chem Roof was acquired by Pettibone, an equipment manufacturer based in Lisle, Illinois. Ferro joined Pettibone at the time of the transaction, and at the age of 25, became the company's youngest division president. He devised a plan for the company to place its inventory and price sheets on the Internet so customers could process their own orders, a revolutionary concept for the manufacturing industry at the time.

In 1994, Ferro left Pettibone to establish Click Commerce, a company that provides business application software. At the age of 33, Ferro took Click Commerce public. With an initial public offering date of June 30, 2000, Click Commerce was one of the first tech companies to reopen the market after the tech crash in March of that year. Ferro's success in his early career made him one of the youngest people named to the Forbes "Tech's 100 Highest Rollers" list. During this time, Ferro was named Young Entrepreneur of the Year 2003 by the Collegiate Entrepreneurs Organization, and won the KPMG Illinois High Tech award as well as the Ernst & Young Entrepreneur of the Year in Technology award. In 2006, he sold Click Commerce to Illinois Tool Works, a client of the company, for $292 million.

In 2007, Ferro founded Merrick Ventures LLC, a private equity firm that connects investors with tech companies. He also founded the Illinois Accelerator (I2a) Fund the same year. Through Merrick Ventures, Ferro acquired a stake in Merge Healthcare, a Milwaukee-based medical data company that he relocated to Chicago. After he brought the company out of the brink of bankruptcy, Merge Healthcare was sold to IBM in 2016 for $1 billion.

In 2012, Ferro founded Higi with Khan Siddiqui. The company produces biometric screening stations installed in public places that can measure a person's weight, body mass index, pulse and blood pressure, which users can track using an app. In 2013, Chicago-based rapper Lupe Fiasco joined the company as creative director and was part of the company's debut with Ferro and Siddiqui at that year's South by Southwest in Austin, Texas. In 2014, Higi reached a deal with pharmacy chain Rite Aid to become its sole provider of health stations. Higi received an investment from BlueCross BlueShield Venture Partners in March 2017.

As the chairman and CEO of Merrick Ventures, Ferro was the founding chairman of Wrapports which is the parent company of the Chicago Sun-Times. In February 2016, Merrick Ventures invested $44.4 million in the Chicago-based company Tribune Publishing, which is the parent company of the Chicago Tribune. This made Ferro and Merrick Ventures the then top shareholder of Tribune Publishing. Ferro was appointed non-executive chairman of Tribune Publishing. He donated his shares in the Sun-Times to a charitable trust to avoid antitrust issues.

In March 2018, Ferro was allegedly involved in sexual harassment of two women, Kathryn Minshew and Hagan Kappler. Minshew, the founder of career website The Muse, accused Ferro making sexual advances toward her at a corporate apartment in Chicago in 2013. Kappler, while working for the firm Ingersoll Rand, claims to have been groped by Ferro in a Las Vegas hotel suite in early 2016. Ferro resigned from Tribune Publishing a few hours before the news about these allegations were published in media. In November 2019, Ferro also sold his 25% share in Tribune Publishing to Alden Global Capital.

== Other memberships and philanthropy ==
In 2005, Ferro was named co-chairman of the Chicagoland Entrepreneurial Center alongside Jim O'Connor Jr. and served on the Mayor's Council of Technology Advisors under Mayor Richard M. Daley. He also founded the Merrick Momentum Awards, an annual event to honor the top three-year-old Chicago corporation. In 2006, Ferro was the Chairman of the Sports Advisory Council, a board of corporate citizens named by Mayor Daley to lead the Chicago bid for the 2016 Summer Olympics.

== Personal life ==
Ferro is married to Jacqueline J. Ferro, president of Ferro Farms Cider. They have three children.
