= The Daily Ledger =

Newspaper in Canton, Illinois

- Type: Daily newspaper
- Owner: USA Today Co.
- Publisher: David Adams
- Editor: Alyse Thompson
- Founded: September 20, 1850; 175 years ago, as The Illinois Public Ledger
- Headquarters: 53 West Elm Street, Canton, Illinois 61520, United States
- OCLC number: 28365215
- Website: cantondailyledger.com

The Daily Ledger is an American daily newspaper published Monday through Friday mornings, and Saturday mornings, in Canton, Illinois. It is owned by USA Today Co.

The Ledger also publishes a free shopper publication, The Fulton County Shopper. Both the shopper and the daily circulate throughout Fulton County, Illinois.

The Ledger name dates to 1850, when The Illinois Public Ledger, a weekly newspaper, was founded in Lewistown, Illinois, the Fulton County seat; it moved to Canton in 1854, under the name Fulton Ledger. It adopted a daily publication schedule, as the Canton Daily Ledger, October 3, 1912, and absorbed the Canton Daily Register in 1926; the combined paper was known as the Canton Daily Ledger and Daily Register until 1961.

In 1987, the paper was acquired by Hollinger. Former owner GateHouse Media purchased roughly 160 daily and weekly newspapers from Hollinger in 1997.
