= Click Commerce =

American research software company

Click Commerce, Inc.
- Type: Subsidiary
- Industry: Business software
- Founded: Chicago, Illinois (1996; 30 years ago)
- Headquarters: Hillsboro, Oregon; 45.5342°N 122.8795°W
- Key people: Nick Stier, President; Ron Mitchell, VP, Professional Services; Gary Raetz, COO, Chief Operating Officer; Gary Whitney, VP, Sales and Marketing
- Products: eResearch Portal, Research Administration
- Number of employees: 63 est. (2010)
- Parent: Huron Consulting Group

Click Commerce, Inc. is a research software company based in Hillsboro, Oregon, United States. Incorporated in 1996 as Click Interactive, Inc. in Chicago, Illinois, the company historically supplied business application software and related services.

== History ==
Click Commerce was founded by Michael W. Ferro, Jr., Jim Heising, and Sarah O'Donnell and was incorporated in 1996 as Click Interactive, Incorporated. The company changed its name to Click Commerce, Inc. in 1999 and went public on NASDAQ in June, 2000 under the symbol CKCM.

In 2004, Click purchased Oregon based Webridge, a privately held software developer that marketed tr compliance related software to research universities. Click Commerce retained Webridge's office in Oregon along with part of that company's staff.

In May 2004, Click Commerce agreed to acquire bTrade, an Irving, Texas based business-to-business software company, the acquisition was completed in July 2004.

In October 2006, the company was acquired by Illinois Tool Works (ITW) and operated as an independent business unit until May 15, 2009, when Marlin Equity Partners acquired three software operating units from ITW. The transaction included the Service Network Solutions (“SNS”) and Research and Healthcare Solutions (“RHS”) businesses and the rights to the Click Commerce, Inc. name. Additionally, the Contract Service and Management (“CSM”) business was also acquired but merged into Emptoris, an existing Marlin portfolio company based in Burlington, Massachusetts, specializing in supply management and contract management software. Click Commerce’s eCommerce and Channel Management Division was retained by ITW and is doing business as Requisite Technology, Inc.

Marlin Equity Partners subsequently acquired Servigistics, a strategic service management company headquartered in Atlanta, Georgia, and on July 7, 2009 announced its merger with Click Commerce’s Service Network Solutions (SNS) unit. In November 2010, Click Commerce was purchased by Huron Consulting Group, but retained its software development and services site in Oregon.

== Operations ==
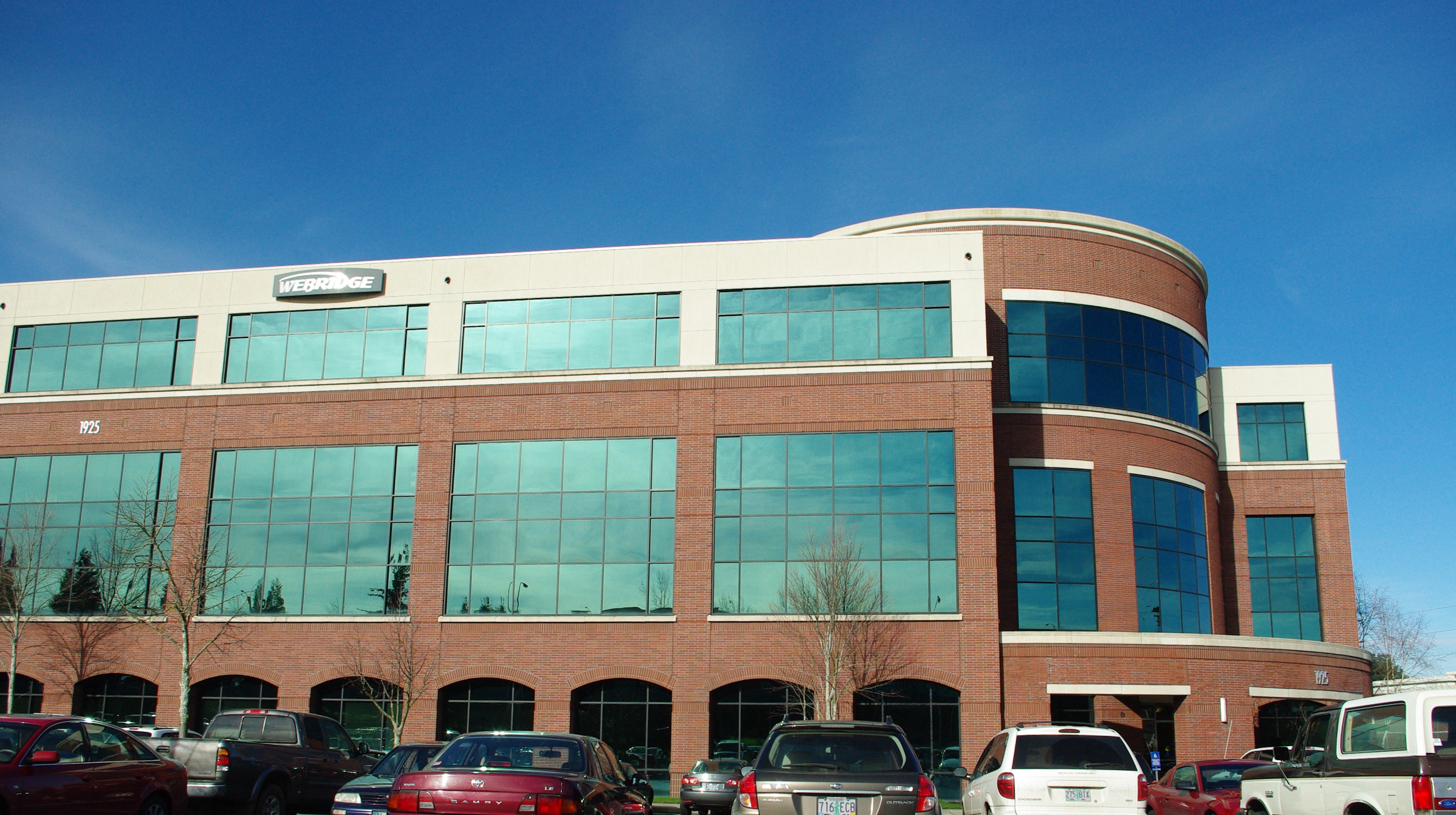
The Click Commerce office.

The Research and Healthcare Division retained the Click Commerce name, and is headquartered in the Portland metropolitan area of Oregon. Specializing in the business of research, their eResearch Portal includes:

- Institutional Review Boards (IRB)
- Grants and Contracts
- SF424 eSubmission
- Conflict of interest
- Clinical Trials Billing
- Institutional Animal Care and Use Committees (IACUC)
- Institutional Biosafety Committees (IBC)
- Animal Operations
- Effort Reporting
- Safety Committees

== See also ==
- List of companies based in Oregon
