= WPZA =

- Canton, Illinois; United States
- Broadcast area: Peoria, Illinois
- Frequency: 107.9 MHz (HD Radio)

Programming
- Format: Contemporary worship music
- Subchannels: HD2: K-Love; HD3: K-Love Eras
- Network: Air1

Ownership
- Owner: Educational Media Foundation

History
- First air date: 1968
- Former call signs: WBYS-FM (1968–2004); WCDD (2004–2021)
- Former frequencies: 98.3 MHz (1968–1997)

Technical information
- Licensing authority: FCC
- Facility ID: 22899
- Class: B1
- ERP: 25,000 watts
- HAAT: 82 meters
- Transmitter coordinates: 40°32′40.6″N 90°1′15.9″W (NAD83)

Links
- Public license information: Public file; LMS
- Website: air1.com

WPZA (107.9 FM, Air1) is a radio station broadcasting a contemporary worship music format. It is licensed to Canton, Illinois and serves the Peoria radio market. The station is currently owned by Educational Media Foundation.

== History ==
WPZA was known as WBYS-FM for many years on 98.3 FM with an easy listening format. In August 1997, the station was upgraded to 25,000 watts and moved to 107.9 FM. This allowed the station to target the Peoria market, and in late 2004 switched to a Classic Hits format as "CD 107.9".

WPZA is one of only 5 radio stations in the Peoria radio market with a Class B signal. In July, 2008, a tornado took down the original tower constructed in 1947 for sister station WBYS, and a new tower was constructed and registered in March, 2009.

On December 27, 2010, WCDD changed the format to country, branded as "CD Country 107.9".

On December 11, 2020, WCDD was sold to EMF (Educational Media Foundation) for $170,000, pending a flip to Air1. The station signed off on March 31, 2021, at 6:00 PM CDT to make way for the switch to Air1, with "A Boy Named Sue" from Johnny Cash being the final song played on the format before signing off.

On March 31, 2021, Illiana Communications, LLC closed the sale on WCDD to EMF, who changed the call sign to WPZA. Meanwhile, the country format has now moved to WBYS and rebranded as "94.1 BYS."
