= BTrade =

bTrade, LLC
- Type: Private
- Industry: Software
- Predecessor: Comm-Press Technologies Inc.
- Founded: 1990; 36 years ago
- Founders: James Taylor; Gene Lucas
- Headquarters: Dallas, Texas, United States
- Key people: Heather Purse (CEO); Hanz Jorgensen (COO)
- Parent: Click Commerce (2004–2008)
- Website: www.btrade.com

bTrade, LLC is an American software company based in Dallas, Texas, that develops managed file transfer (MFT) and electronic data interchange (EDI) software for business-to-business data exchange. It was founded in 1990 in Irving, Texas, as Comm-Press Technologies and adopted the bTrade name in 2000. The company was acquired by Click Commerce in 2004 and returned to independent ownership in 2008.

== History ==
The company was founded in 1990 as Comm-Press Technologies Inc. by James Taylor and Gene Lucas. Its founders were former IBM employees, and its early software provided secure data exchange for IBM mainframe, AS/400 and RS/6000 systems. Its first product was data compression technology developed by Taylor to reduce the cost of sending EDI data over value-added networks (VANs).

=== bTrade.com (1999–2004) ===
In the late 1990s, Lucas proposed moving the company's software solutions onto the internet. The company raised $15.7 million in venture capital, $4.5 million in July 1999 and $11.2 million in April 2000, from investors including First Analysis Venture Capital, Hook Partners, Shawmut Capital Partners and CMS Cos. In March 2000 it relaunched as bTrade.com and released WebAccess2000 and SecureServe2000, products for exchanging business documents securely over the web. Customers included Citigroup, FedEx, American Honda Finance and NCS Pearson. In September 2000, chief executive David Lonsdale told The Dallas Morning News that the company would consider going public the following year.

The company did not proceed with the public offering. The Dallas Morning News later reported that bTrade reduced its workforce during 2000 and 2001 and subsequently concentrated on software development and sales. The company reported reaching profitability in early 2001.

By 2003 the company, then known as bTrade Inc., sold web-based EDI software built around the AS2 protocol, and its products had passed the Drummond Group's AS2 interoperability tests. It also sold software to help suppliers meet retailers' requirements for UCCnet item synchronization, a product-data registry pushed by Walmart and other large retailers, and completed UCCnet Services 2.3 certification in 2004.

=== Click Commerce (2004–2008) ===
In May 2004, Chicago-based Click Commerce agreed to acquire bTrade for about 850,000 shares of common stock, valued at $3.6 million to $4 million, and the repayment of about $1.2 million in bTrade debt. Click Commerce planned to use bTrade's software to connect its channel sales software to UCCnet. The acquisition was completed in July 2004, and the bTrade brand was folded into Click Commerce.

=== Independent company (2008–present) ===
In 2008, Steve Zapata, a former IBM executive, and other investors acquired the bTrade business back from Click Commerce and re-established it as an independent company, with Zapata serving as chief executive. During this period, bTrade expanded its managed file transfer products and added Accelerated File Transfer Protocol (AFTP) capabilities.

In 2009, the National Institute of Standards and Technology (NIST) validated a random-number algorithm in the bTrade Cryptographic Library. In 2013, IT Jungle reported that bTrade's software was used in about 100,000 installations, with a strong presence in Mexico and Latin America, and customers in the automotive, manufacturing, distribution and consumer packaged goods industries. The company was later based in Burbank, California.

Zapata later stepped down as chief executive and joined the company's advisory board. Hanz Jorgensen became chief operating officer and managing partner, with Heather Purse as chief executive officer. bTrade also relocated its headquarters from Burbank back to Dallas.

== Products ==
TDXchange is bTrade's enterprise managed file transfer platform; it supports protocols including SFTP, FTPS, HTTPS, AS2, AS4 and the company's proprietary Accelerated File Transfer Protocol (AFTP). The company also offers TDCloud, a hosted version of its MFT software; TDAccess, an AS2 file transfer endpoint; TDCompress, a compression and encryption utility; and AttachGuard, an add-in for Microsoft Outlook that sends email attachments as secure download links. Earlier products included TDNgine, TDPeer and TDBrowser and the eVision EDI and XML translator.
