= Raymond Phineas Stearns =

American historian (1904–1970)

Raymond Phineas Stearns (January 11, 1904 – November 15, 1970) was an American historian, chiefly of colonial America. His book on science in colonial America, Science in the British Colonies: 1570-1779, won a National Book Award for Nonfiction in 1971.

== Early life ==
Stearns was born and raised on a farm in Canton in central Illinois. After high school he spent two years teaching elementary school in Fulton County, Illinois before attending Illinois College in Jacksonville. After graduating in 1927, Stearns taught for two years at Winchester Community High School in Winchester, Illinois. In 1929 he went to Harvard College thanks to a scholarship from the Harvard Club of Chicago. He earned a master's in history in 1931 and a doctorate in 1934, while also working as a teaching assistant. Stearns spent the next year doing post-doctoral work in England with support from the Social Science Research Council. After a second post-doctoral year at Harvard, Stearns returned to Illinois with his family to teach.

== Career ==
While researching at the British Museum Stearns had found the papers of Sir William Boswell, English ambassador to the Low Countries, which showed the development of Congregationalism among English refugees in Holland; his notes were used by Perry Miller in writing his first book, Orthodoxy in Massachusetts, 1630-1650 (1933). Stearns eventually was able to write his own work focused on the English refugees, Congregationalism in the Dutch Netherlands (1940), which won the Frank S. Brewer Prize from the American Society of Church History.

Stearns spent the 1936–1937 academic year as the head of the history department at Lake Forest College and then settled in Urbana to teach at the University of Illinois there, becoming a full professor in 1948. For many years Stearns could not find work teaching colonial history and instead taught European history, even writing a textbook (Pageant of Europe, 1947; revised edition 1961). Stearns was finally able to complete a full biography of Hugh Peter, extending his doctoral thesis work on Peter in New England, in 1954 and published The Strenuous Puritan: Hugh Peter, 1598-1660, which Carl Bridenbaugh called the definitive biography of Peter.

Stearns spent a year teaching at Ghent University in Belgium; on his return he published (with George Frederick Frick) Mark Catesby: The Colonial Audubon (1961).

Stearns had for many years been writing papers on science and scientists in the colonies, drawn from papers in the British Museum. He drew these together into a massive work on Science in the British Colonies of America (1970). Having become an emeritus professor at the University of Illinois, Stearns accepted a teaching position at Illinois State University in Normal, but died during a visit to his son in New Jersey. His book received the National Book Award for Nonfiction the following year (1971).

== Personal life ==
Stearns married fellow Illinois College alumna Mary Elizabeth Scott (1905–1946) in 1927, after his own graduation. They had a son and two daughters together before her early death at the age of forty. Stearns then married Josephine Bunch, a graduate student and teaching assistant, and they had another three daughters. Stearns and his family moved to Milo. His second wife outlived him and accepted the National Book Award for him.

While in London, Stearns met Walter Muir Whitehill; on their return to Boston, he introduced him to the circle of Harvard colonial historians including Perry Miller, Carl Bridenbaugh, and Clifford K. Shipton. Stearns was a lifelong friend and colleague of Shipton's, serving together on the Council of the Institute of Early American History and Culture and visiting each other when possible.

Stearns died in New Brunswick, New Jersey on November 15, 1970, and was buried in the Mount Hope Cemetery and Mausoleum in Urbana, Illinois.
