= Honest services fraud =

Crime in the United States

United States Supreme Court cases
- Skilling v. United States, 561 U.S. 358 (2010); Black v. United States, 561 U.S. 465 (2010); Weyhrauch v. United States, 561 U.S. 476 (2010); McDonnell v. United States, No. 15-474, 579 U.S. ___ (2016); Percoco v. United States, No. 21-1158, 599 U.S. ___ (2023)

Honest services fraud is a crime defined in 18 U.S.C. § 1346, the federal mail and wire fraud statute. The idea of this law was to criminalize not only schemes to defraud victims of money and property, but also schemes to defraud victims of intangible rights such as the "honest services" of a public official.

The statute states "For the purposes of this chapter, the term 'scheme or artifice to defraud' includes a scheme or artifice to deprive another of the intangible right of honest services." The statute has been applied by federal prosecutors in cases of public corruption as well as in cases in which private individuals breached a fiduciary duty to another. In the former, the courts have been divided on the question of whether a state law violation is necessary for honest services fraud to have occurred. In the latter, the courts have taken differing approaches to determining whether a private individual has committed honest services fraud—a test based on reasonably foreseeable economic harm and a test based on materiality. The statute, which has been a target of criticism, was given a narrow construction by the Supreme Court of the United States in the case of Skilling v. United States (2010). In order to avoid finding the statute to be unconstitutionally vague, the Court interpreted the statute to cover only "fraudulent schemes to deprive another of honest services through bribes or kickbacks supplied by a third party who ha[s] not been deceived".

== History and case law ==
Since at least 1941, particularly in the 1970s and 1980s, and prior to 1987, the courts had interpreted the mail fraud and wire fraud statutes as criminalizing not only schemes to defraud victims of money and property, but also schemes to defraud victims of intangible rights such as the "honest services" of a public official. In 1987, the Supreme Court ruled in McNally v. United States that the mail fraud and wire fraud statutes pertained strictly to schemes to defraud victims of tangible property, including money. In 1988, Congress enacted a new law that specifically criminalized schemes to defraud victims of "the intangible right of honest services."

=== Meaning of "honest services" in public corruption ===
Honest services fraud is generally more easily proven in the public sphere than in the private, because honest services fraud by public officials can include most unethical conduct, whereas honest services fraud by private individuals only includes some unethical conduct. Federal courts have generally recognized two main areas of public-sector honest service fraud: bribery (direct or indirect), where a public official was paid in some way for a particular decision or action, and failure to disclose a conflict of interest, resulting in personal gain.

==== Necessity, or lack thereof, of state law violations ====
In 1997, the United States Court of Appeals for the Fifth Circuit decided in United States v. Brumley that in order for a state official to have committed honest services fraud, he or she must have violated a state statute defining the services which were owed to the employer (the state).

We find nothing to suggest that Congress was attempting in § 1346 to garner to the federal government the right to impose upon states a federal vision of appropriate services—to establish, in other words, an ethical regime for state employees. Such a taking of power would sorely tax separation of powers and erode our federalist structure. Under the most natural reading of the statute, a federal prosecutor must prove that conduct of a state official breached a duty respecting the provision of services owed to the official's employer under state law. Stated directly, the official must act or fail to act contrary to the requirements of his job under state law. This means that if the official does all that is required under state law, alleging that the services were not otherwise done "honestly" does not charge a violation of the mail fraud statute.

However, the First, Fourth, Ninth, and Eleventh Circuit Courts have all held that the federal statute does not limit the meaning of "honest services" to violations of state law. As the Ninth Circuit decided in United States v. Weyhrauch in 2008,

Because laws governing official conduct differ from state to state, conditioning mail fraud convictions on state law means that conduct in one state might violate the mail fraud statute, whereas identical conduct in a neighboring state would not. Congress has given no indication it intended the criminality of official conduct under federal law to depend on geography.

The defendant in that case, Bruce Weyhrauch, appealed that decision to the United States Supreme Court, which ruled in his favor, remanding the case back to the Ninth Circuit, where federal charges were eventually dropped.

==== Intent to defraud and personal benefit ====
In 1997, the United States Court of Appeals for the First Circuit set a key limit on honest services fraud in United States v. Czubinski, ruling that a mere workplace violation does not constitute fraud without evidence of depriving the employer of property in some way. Richard Czubinski was employed in Massachusetts by the Internal Revenue Service when, in 1992, he violated IRS rules by carrying out several unauthorized searches of the IRS database and accessing files outside of the course of his official duties. In 1995, he was convicted of wire fraud (defrauding the IRS of property and the public of his honest services) and computer fraud. The appellate court reversed the honest services fraud conviction on the basis that Czubinski's actions did not amount to anything more than a workplace violation, warranting no more than a dismissal:

Czubinski was not bribed or otherwise influenced in any public decisionmaking capacity. Nor did he embezzle funds. He did not receive, nor can it be found that he intended to receive, any tangible benefit. ... The conclusive consideration is that the government simply did not prove that Czubinski deprived, or intended to deprive, the public or his employer of their right to his honest services. Although he clearly committed wrongdoing in searching confidential information, there is no suggestion that he failed to carry out his official tasks adequately, or intended to do so.

Czubinski's other convictions were also reversed.

=== Meaning of "honest services" in private fiduciary relationships ===
Although the law is most often applied to corrupt public officials, several federal courts have upheld honest services fraud convictions of private individuals who breached a fiduciary duty to another, such as an employer.

Generally, the federal circuit courts have adhered to one of two approaches when dealing with honest services fraud cases. One, the "reasonably foreseeable economic harm" test, requires that the defendant intentionally breached his fiduciary duty and "foresaw or reasonably should have foreseen" that his actions could cause economic harm to his victim. The other, the "materiality" test, requires that the defendant possessed a fraudulent intent and made "any misrepresentation that has the natural tendency to influence or is capable of influencing" the victim to change his behavior.

==== "Reasonably foreseeable economic harm" test ====
In 1997, the United States Court of Appeals for the Sixth Circuit held in United States v. Frost that private individuals could be also convicted of honest services fraud. Two professors at the University of Tennessee Space Institute, Walter Frost and Robert Eugene Turner, were also president and vice president, respectively, of FWG Associates, a private atmospheric science research firm. Frost and Turner gave FWG reports to two of their students, one a doctoral candidate employed by the Department of the Army and one a master's degree candidate employed by NASA, allowing them to plagiarize an overwhelming majority of the reports for their respective dissertations. They also allowed another doctoral candidate, employed by NASA, to submit a dissertation which was mostly written by one of their employees at FWG. Their aim was to secure federal contracts with the agencies employing these students. All three students received their degrees, facilitated by Frost and Turner. In addition to many other charges, Frost and Turner were convicted of three counts of mail fraud for defrauding the University of Tennessee of their honest services as employees. On appeal, Frost and Turner argued that § 1346 did not apply to them because they were not public servants. The court disagreed, ruling that "private individuals, such as Frost and Turner, may commit mail fraud by breaching a fiduciary duty and thereby depriving the person or entity to which the duty is owed of the intangible right to the honest services of that individual."

In 1998, the United States Court of Appeals for the D.C. Circuit upheld the wire fraud conviction of Sun-Diamond Growers of California for defrauding its public relations firm of the honest services of one of its agents, James H. Lake, in order to curry favor with the United States Secretary of Agriculture, Mike Espy. The corporation's vice president for corporate affairs, Richard Douglas, had acted in the scheme in such a manner that potentially could have caused economic harm to the public relations firm (tarnishing its reputation by engaging Lake in illegal activity) – he and Lake had illegally funneled contributions to a congressional candidate, Espy's brother. Sun-Diamond argued that those actions could not be criminal because there was no intent to do economic harm to the firm. However, the court ruled that an intent to do economic harm was not necessary to have committed wire fraud, affirming a pre-McNally decision in light of the 1988 statute:

In the private sector context, § 1346 poses special risks. Every material act of dishonesty by an employee deprives the employer of that worker's "honest services," yet not every such act is converted into a federal crime by the mere use of the mails or interstate phone system. Aware of the risk that federal criminal liability could metastasize, we held in Lemire that "not every breach of a fiduciary duty works a criminal fraud." ... Rather, "[t]here must be a failure to disclose something which in the knowledge or contemplation of the employee poses an independent business risk to the employer." ... Sun-Diamond appears to confuse the requirement of an intent to defraud...with a requirement of intent to cause economic harm.

In 1999, the United States Court of Appeals for the Eleventh Circuit adopted a similar interpretation in United States v. deVegter. Michael deVegter was a financial advisor hired by Fulton County, Georgia, to recommend an underwriter for the county to hire. DeVegter accepted a payment of about $42,000 from Richard Poirier in exchange for influencing Fulton County to hire Poirier's investment banking firm for the job. DeVegter and Poirier were both indicted for conspiracy and wire fraud, with the latter including charges under the honest services statute. The district court dismissed the honest services charges for lack of evidence before the trial began; the government appealed. The court agreed with the government that there was sufficient evidence alleged in the indictment for the defendants to be charged with honest services fraud, because the allegations showed a breach of fiduciary duty and an intent to defraud in such a manner that "reasonably foreseeable economic harm to Fulton County" was a consequence of the scheme.

In 2001, the United States Court of Appeals for the Fourth Circuit recognized that there were two different tests that other circuit courts had generally used to determine whether honest services fraud had been committed; in United States v. Vinyard, it concluded that the "reasonably foreseeable economic harm" test was superior (because it was based on employee intent and not employer response) and applied that test to the case at hand. The defendant in the case, Michael Vinyard, had been convicted of fourteen counts of mail fraud and twelve counts of money laundering. His brother, James Vinyard, was an employee of the Sunoco Products Corporation who was charged with finding an independent broker to research recycled resins for their manufacture of plastic bags. The brothers instead created their own brokerage, "Charles Stewart Enterprises," and misrepresented it to Sunoco as a legitimate, independent firm that was supplying recycled resins at the lowest possible price. They purchased recycled resins from plastic vendors and, marking up the price, sold them to Sunoco, which eventually yielded $2.8 million in profits. The brothers funneled these profits from CSE to themselves through another entity in order to conceal their involvement with CSE on their tax returns. When the brothers were eventually indicted for mail fraud and money laundering, James Vinyard pleaded guilty and testified against his brother. Michael Vinyard appealed, arguing that his conviction of honest services fraud (defrauding Sunoco of the honest services of his brother, their employee) was wrongful because he did not cause harm nor did he intend to cause economic harm to the victim, Sunoco. Upholding his conviction, the court rejected this argument:

The reasonably foreseeable harm test is met whenever, at the time of the fraud scheme, the employee could foresee that the scheme potentially might be detrimental to the employer's economic well-being. Furthermore, the concept of "economic risk" embraces the idea of risk to future opportunities for savings or profit; the focus on the employer's wellbeing encompasses both the long-term and the short-term health of the business. Whether the risk materializes or not is irrelevant; the point is that the employee has no right to endanger the employer's financial health or jeopardize the employer's long-term prospects through self-dealing. Therefore, so long as the employee could have reasonably foreseen the risk to which he was exposing the employer, the requirements of § 1346 will have been met.

In 2006, the United States Court of Appeals for the Ninth Circuit treated the issue of whether private defendants could be prosecuted under § 1346 as settled law, citing the numerous other circuits which had affirmed the practice. In the case United States v. Williams, the defendant, John Anthony Williams, was an Oregon insurance salesman who had sold several annuities to an elderly rancher named Loyd Stubbs. When Stubbs liquidated his annuities, Williams deposited the resulting funds in a joint bank account he had opened in his and Stubbs' names. Williams proceeded to make massive cash withdrawals from the account, depositing the money in his own personal account and spending much of it; he also wired money to personal bank accounts he had in Belize and Louisiana. Williams was convicted of four counts of wire fraud, three counts of mail fraud, three counts of money laundering, and one count of foreign transportation of stolen money; the fraud charges stemmed from schemes to defraud Stubbs of money and of Williams' honest services as his financial advisor. On appeal, Williams argued that § 1346 did not apply to private commerce. The court disagreed, and, citing previous case law, ruled that within a fiduciary relationship the statute applied.

==== "Materiality" test ====
In 1996, the United States Court of Appeals for the Fifth Circuit laid out the "materiality" test in its decision in United States v. Gray. Kevin Gray, Gary Thomas, and Troy Drummond were three members of the men's basketball coaching staff at Baylor University in Texas. These coaches helped five players, recruited from two-year colleges, to obtain the credits required for eligibility and possibly scholarships by providing these students with written course work or answers to correspondence exams, which were then sent to the sponsoring schools as the students' work. They were convicted of conspiracy, mail fraud, and wire fraud; the fraud charges stemmed from schemes to deprive Baylor University of both property (in the form of scholarships) and the coaches' honest services as Baylor employees. The court upheld the convictions, affirming the honest services fraud convictions on the basis that the coaches made "material" misrepresentations:

A breach of fiduciary duty can constitute illegal fraud...only when there is some detriment to the employer. The detriment can be a deprivation of an employee's faithful and honest services if a violation of the employee's duty to disclose material information is involved. ... Materiality exists whenever "an employee has reason to believe the information would lead a reasonable employer to change its business conduct." The information withheld, i.e. the "coaches' cheating scheme", was material because Baylor did not get the quality student it expected. Further, appellants failure to disclose the scheme to Baylor was material as Baylor might have been able to recruit other qualified, eligible students to play basketball. Instead, once the scheme was suspected, Baylor was forced to institute a costly investigation and the players under suspicion were withheld from competition. It is quite reasonable to believe that Baylor would have changed its business conduct had it known of the "cheating scheme."

In 1997, the United States Court of Appeals for the Tenth Circuit also applied the "materiality" test in its decision in United States v. Cochran. Robert M. Cochran was a bond underwriter in Oklahoma who was convicted of five counts of wire fraud, two counts of money laundering, and one count of interstate transportation of stolen property. Three of the wire fraud counts for which Cochran was convicted were honest services fraud. Cochran's firm, Stifel, Nicolaus & Company, served as managing underwriter when the SSM Healthcare System, a non-profit corporation operating several hospitals and nursing homes, issued more than $265 million of tax-exempt bonds; Sakura Global Capital bid $400,000 to provide SSM with a forward supply contract. However, SGC subsequently made a secret payment of $100,000 to Cochran's firm; thus, Cochran supposedly deprived SSM and its bondholders of his honest services. The appellate court reversed his conviction, deciding that the government did not provide sufficient evidence that Cochran had actually defrauded SSM or its bondholders of his honest services, applying the "materiality" test:

Though Stifel misrepresented that SGC would not pay an additional fee to Stifel for the forward supply contract, this information resulted in no actual or potential harm to SSM. ... No evidence independent of the alleged scheme suggests in any way that Mr. Cochran sought to harm SSM or its bondholders. Moreover, we know not from this record how SSM would have changed its conduct had the disclosure been made.

In 1999, the United States Court of Appeals for the Eighth Circuit diverged from the D.C. Circuit's Sun-Diamond ruling in its decision in United States v. Pennington. Donald B. Pennington was the president of Harvest Foods, a grocery store chain in eastern Arkansas, when that company contracted with a food broker and a consultant, John Oldner, to negotiate deals between it and its suppliers. The broker and consultant both funneled a portion of their money from Harvest Foods and its supplier to Pennington – through a sham corporation, Capitol City Marketing – as kickbacks. Pennington was convicted of money laundering and mail fraud; in his appeal he contended that there was insufficient evidence to convict him because the government had failed to show that he had an intent to defraud Harvest Foods of his honest services as its president. The court upheld the conviction, stating that there was sufficient evidence that his actions were a breach of his duty as a fiduciary of Harvest Foods to disclose his material interest in their contracts with Oldner and the broker. However, the court also went further and required (and found) intent to economically harm:

Pennington and Oldner correctly assert that, when dealing with business transactions in the private sector, a mere breach of fiduciary or employee duty may not be sufficient to deprive a client or corporation of "honest services" for purposes of § 1346—to be guilty of mail fraud, defendants must also cause or intend to cause actual harm or injury, and in most business contexts, that means financial or economic harm. ... However, proof of intent to harm may be inferred from the willful non-disclosure by a fiduciary, such as a corporate officer, of material information he has a duty to disclose.

In 2003, the United States Court of Appeals for the Second Circuit, like the Fourth Circuit in Vinyard, noted the existence of the two tests, but unlike the Fourth Circuit, it opted to use the "materiality" test (describing it as "arising out of fundamental principles of the law of fraud" and critiquing the alternative as "designed simply to limit the scope" of the law). It applied this test to the case at hand, United States v. Rybicki. The defendants were two personal injury lawyers, Thomas Rybicki and Fredric Grae, in the state of New York; both were convicted of twenty counts of mail fraud, two counts of wire fraud, and one count of conspiracy. The fraud charges pertained to a scheme to make illegal payments to insurance claims adjusters with the intent of inducing the adjusters to expedite the settlement of certain claims; Rybicki and Grae made such payments in at least twenty cases. As the acceptance of such payments by the adjusters was against the insurance companies' policies, Rybicki and Grae had defrauded those insurance companies of the honest services of their employees. Such was the basis for the successful fraud prosecution. The court affirmed the conviction, determining that all of the necessary elements for the crime of honest services fraud to have occurred were present, including material misrepresentation. The court defined the crime as follows:

The phrase "scheme or artifice [to defraud] by depriv[ing] another of the intangible right of honest services," in the private sector context, means a scheme or artifice to use the mails or wires to enable an officer or employee of a private entity (or a person in a relationship that gives rise to a duty of loyalty comparable to that owed by employees to employers) purporting to act for and in the interests of his or her employer (or of the other person to whom the duty of loyalty is owed) secretly to act in his or her or the defendant's own interests instead, accompanied by a material misrepresentation made or omission of information disclosed to the employer or other person.

== Usage and criticism ==
The statute grants jurisdiction to the federal government to prosecute local, state and federal officials. It is frequently used to fight public corruption because it is easier to prove than bribery or extortion. The term "honest services" is broad and open to jury interpretation, according to several legal experts. Prosecutions under the 1970 Racketeer Influenced and Corrupt Organizations Act (RICO) frequently use violations of the honest services statute, as mail and wire fraud are predicate acts of racketeering; therefore, two mailings or wire transmissions in the execution of honest services fraud can form "a pattern of racketeering activity."

Prosecutions for honest services fraud that do not involve public corruption generally involve corporate crime, although the line between torts and crimes in such cases is considered murky and unclear.

The law is reportedly a favorite of federal prosecutors because the language of statute is vague enough to be applied to corrupt political officials' unethical or criminal activities when they do not fall into a specific category, such as bribery or extortion. For similar reasons, defense attorneys dislike the law, viewing it as a poorly defined law that can be used by prosecutors to convert any kind of unethical behavior into a federal crime. Often, defendants plead guilty to honest services fraud so as to avoid greater liability under the incredibly broad RICO statute.

Nevertheless, prosecutors must still prove all the elements of mail fraud or wire fraud in a case regarding a scheme to defraud of honest services.

The late U.S. Supreme Court Justice Antonin Scalia criticized the statute, stating that the clause was so poorly defined that it could be the basis for prosecuting "a mayor for using the prestige of his office to get a table at a restaurant without a reservation."

In The Perfect Villain: John McCain and the Demonization of Lobbyist Jack Abramoff, investigative journalist Gary S. Chafetz argued that honest-services fraud is so vague as to be unconstitutional, and that prosecutors abused it as a tool to increase their conviction rates. Bennett L. Gershmann, a professor at Pace University Law School, similarly has contended that the law "is not only subject to abuse...but has been abused." The case of former Alabama Governor Don Siegelman is often cited as an example of possible prosecutorial misconduct and abuse of the honest services law.

Many interest groups oppose the usage of the honest services law, including the conservative United States Chamber of Commerce and Washington Legal Foundation, as well as the more liberal National Association of Criminal Defense Lawyers. One notable proponent of the law is the Citizens for Responsibility and Ethics in Washington.

== Recent notable prosecutions ==
Several notable figures have been charged with or convicted of honest services fraud.

- Washington lobbyist Jack Abramoff pleaded guilty in 2006 to honest services fraud in addition to conspiracy and tax evasion; he was convicted in 2008 of further charges of honest services fraud in addition to further charges of conspiracy and tax evasion.
- Former Enron CEO Jeffrey Skilling was convicted in 2006 of honest services fraud, in addition to securities fraud.
- Former Illinois governor George Ryan was convicted in 2006 of honest services fraud, in addition to racketeering, tax fraud, obstruction of justice, and making false statements to federal agents.
- Former Alabama Governor Don Siegelman was convicted in 2006 of honest services fraud, in addition to conspiracy, bribery, and obstruction of justice.
- Duke Cunningham, a former Congressman from California, was convicted of corruption charges including honest services fraud.
- Bob Ney, a former congressman from Ohio, was convicted of corruption charges including honest services fraud.
- Newspaper magnate Conrad Black was convicted in 2007 of honest services fraud, in addition to obstruction of justice.
- Former Alaska state legislator Bruce Weyhrauch was convicted in 2007 of honest services fraud in addition to bribery and extortion.
- Former New York Senate Majority Leader Joseph Bruno was convicted in 2009 on two counts of honest services fraud.
- Mary McCarty, a former Palm Beach County Commissioner, is currently serving a federal prison sentence for honest services fraud.
- New Jersey political boss Joe Ferriero was convicted in 2009 of conspiracy and two counts of mail fraud.
- Former Illinois governor Rod Blagojevich was indicted in 2009 for allegedly conspiring to commit honest services fraud, as well as for allegedly soliciting bribes.
- Former Alabama state legislator Sue Schmitz was convicted in 2009 of three counts of mail fraud and four counts of fraud involving a program receiving federal funds.
- Judges Mark Ciavarella and Michael Conahan originally pleaded guilty to honest services fraud and conspiracy in the Kids for cash scandal. The pleas were later withdrawn.
- Former Virginia Governor Bob McDonnell and wife Maureen were convicted of multiple counts, including conspiring to defraud the public and honest services violations in September 2014 (convictions overturned by U.S. Supreme Court, 2016).
- In the 2019 college admissions scandal, more than 30 people were charged with conspiracy in an honest services fraud scheme involving bribery and entrance exam cheating, to gain admissions for their children to several universities.
- San Francisco Public Works Director, Mohammed Nuru, as part of a broader Federal probe into the city's contracting practices

== Supreme Court cases ==
In its 2009–2010 term, there were three appeals against the statute at the United States Supreme Court, all challenging its constitutionality. All three appellants were convicted of honest services fraud in 2006 or 2007.

Weyhrauch v. United States, by former Alaska state legislator Bruce Weyhrauch, deals with whether a public official can be charged with honest services fraud without violating his duty under state law.

Black v. United States, by newspaper magnate Conrad Black, deals with whether there must be proof that the defendant knew his actions would cause economic harm to the company.

Skilling v. United States, by former Enron CEO Jeffrey Skilling, deals with whether the honest services statute requires proof of personal gain. He is also contending that the statute is unconstitutionally vague and unfair.

In December 2009, the Associated Press reported that the Justices of the Court "seemed to be in broad agreement that the law is vague and has been used to make a crime out of mistakes, minor transgressions and mere ethical violations." Both liberal and conservative justices have criticized the law. Richard Thornburgh, a former United States Attorney General, has remarked that he expects the court to issue "something fairly sweeping...without doing violence to proper law enforcement."

On June 24, 2010, the Supreme Court ruled unanimously in the cases of Black and Skilling that the law against "honest services" fraud is too vague to constitute a crime unless a bribe or kickback was involved.
