= Wrapports =

Wrapports LLC
- Type: Private
- Founded: December 21, 2011
- Headquarters: 350 North Orleans Street, Chicago, Illinois 60654, United States
- Area served: Chicago metropolitan area
- Key people: Michael W. Ferro, Jr. (chairman); Timothy P. Knight (CEO); Jim Kirk (Senior VP, EIC)
- Website: wrapports.com

Wrapports LLC was the American-based privately owned publisher of the Chicago Sun-Times and the Chicago Reader. It was headquartered in the Sun-Times building in Chicago.

== History ==
The company was launched in late 2011 by Michael W. Ferro Jr., chairman and CEO of the private equity firm Merrick Ventures, and Timothy P. Knight, who was former publisher of Newsday on Long Island, New York, during the time when it was owned by the Tribune Company. Ferro and Knight negotiated to purchase Sun-Times Media Holding Company from the estate of James C. Tyree, who died in 2011 after having led the Sun-Times out of a 2009 bankruptcy.

Ferro and Knight said the name "Wrapports" is meant to signify the "rapport" of new technology and the "wrapping" of a traditional print newspaper. They promised to transform the Sun Times' print products into "a true multi-media experience for our users — how they want it, where they want it, when they want it."

Wrapports reached an agreement to purchase the Sun-Times company in December 2011, debt-free, for a reported $20 million. Tyree had paid $5 million cash, and assumed $20 million in liabilities, two years earlier.

Sun-Times CEO Jeremy Halbreich, who managed the company under Tyree's ownership, stepped down after Wrapports took control of the company. He said he had not felt pressured to sell the newspaper, but found Wrapports to be a good match: "Since Jim passed away, one of my principal concerns was ensuring that the company passed into the right set of hands. I came in on an assignment to try to save the newspaper, and it evolved into something more. This just makes perfect sense for everybody."

The company's assets included the multiple Pulitzer Prize-winning Sun-Times, seven suburban daily newspapers surrounding Chicago in Illinois and Indiana, and the Pioneer Press chain of weekly newspapers north and west of Chicago.

Wrapports expanded in 2012, buying the Chicago Reader and its associated properties. No purchase price was disclosed, though published reports estimated it at $3 million. The Reader, an award-winning alternative weekly newspaper, had been owned by Creative Loafing of Atlanta, which went bankrupt in 2009.

Wrapports' online holdings include websites for each of its newspapers as well as standalone sites for classified advertising, local high school sports, and trivia expert Cecil Adams ("The Straight Dope") of the Reader.

In December 2012, it was announced that Wrapports will be closing all of its suburban offices and moving remaining employees downtown.

In October 2014, Wrapports sold its suburban Chicago newspapers to the Chicago Tribune Media Group.

On July 13, 2017, it was reported that a consortium, consisting of private investors & the Chicago Federation of Labor, led by businessman & former Chicago alderman Edwin Eisendrath, through Eisendrath's company, ST Acquisition Holdings, had acquired the Chicago Sun-Times and the Chicago Reader from Wrapports, beating out Chicago-based publishing company Tronc for ownership.
