= PR:NS =

PR:NS may refer to these TV shows:

- Power Rangers Ninja Storm, ran in 2003
- Power Rangers Ninja Steel, ran in 2017–2018

== See also ==
- PRN (disambiguation)
