= WBYS =

- Canton, Illinois; United States
- Broadcast area: Fulton, Tazewell, and Mason counties
- Frequency: 1560 kHz

Programming
- Format: Full-service country
- Affiliations: ABC Radio News

Ownership
- Owner: Matt Moore and Brent Lee; (Spoon River Media, LLC)

History
- First air date: October 5, 1947

Technical information
- Licensing authority: FCC
- Facility ID: 22898
- Class: D
- Power: 250 watts day 18 watts night
- Transmitter coordinates: 40°32′40.1″N 90°01′15.4″W
- Translator: 93.7 W229BZ (Canton)

Links
- Public license information: Public file; LMS
- Website: www.1560wbys.com

WBYS (1560 kHz) is an AM radio station licensed for Canton, Illinois.

In September 2013, a 250-watt low-power FM translator (W229BZ) was leased and added as a simulcast of WBYS on the FM dial at 93.7 FM.

In March 2021, WBYS AM and sister station WCDD FM (107.9 CD Country), merged programming and content, and the FM simulcast was moved to translator 94.1 FM (W231EC). The station rebranded to "94.1 BYS" Country hits from today and yesterday. While the ag news/talk format was retained, WBYS AM and 94.1 W231EC began broadcasting country music upon the sale of WCDD FM to the Educational Media Foundation in 2021. WCDD then flipped to Air1 worship and the call letters were changed to WPZA-FM.

The station broadcasts St. Louis Cardinal baseball. WBYS also carries the Chicago Bulls, University of Illinois football and basketball, and high school football, boys and girls basketball, baseball and softball.

== History ==
WBYS began broadcasting October 5, 1947, on 1560 kHz with 250 W power (daytime only). It was owned by Fulton County Broadcasting Company. Broadcasting magazine reported that more than 3,500 people attended an open house in the station's new building.
