= Blyton, Illinois =

- Unincorporated community
- Location within Illinois Location within the United States
- Coordinates: 40°33′51″N 90°16′35″W
- Country: United States
- State: Illinois
- County: Fulton
- Elevation: 627 ft (191 m)
- Time zone: UTC-6 (Central (CST))
  - Summer (DST): UTC-5 (CDT)
- Area code: 309
- GNIS feature ID: 422482

Blyton is an unincorporated community in Fulton County, Illinois, United States. The community is located on Illinois Route 9, west of Canton.
