= Parlin Library =

- U.S. National Register of Historic Places
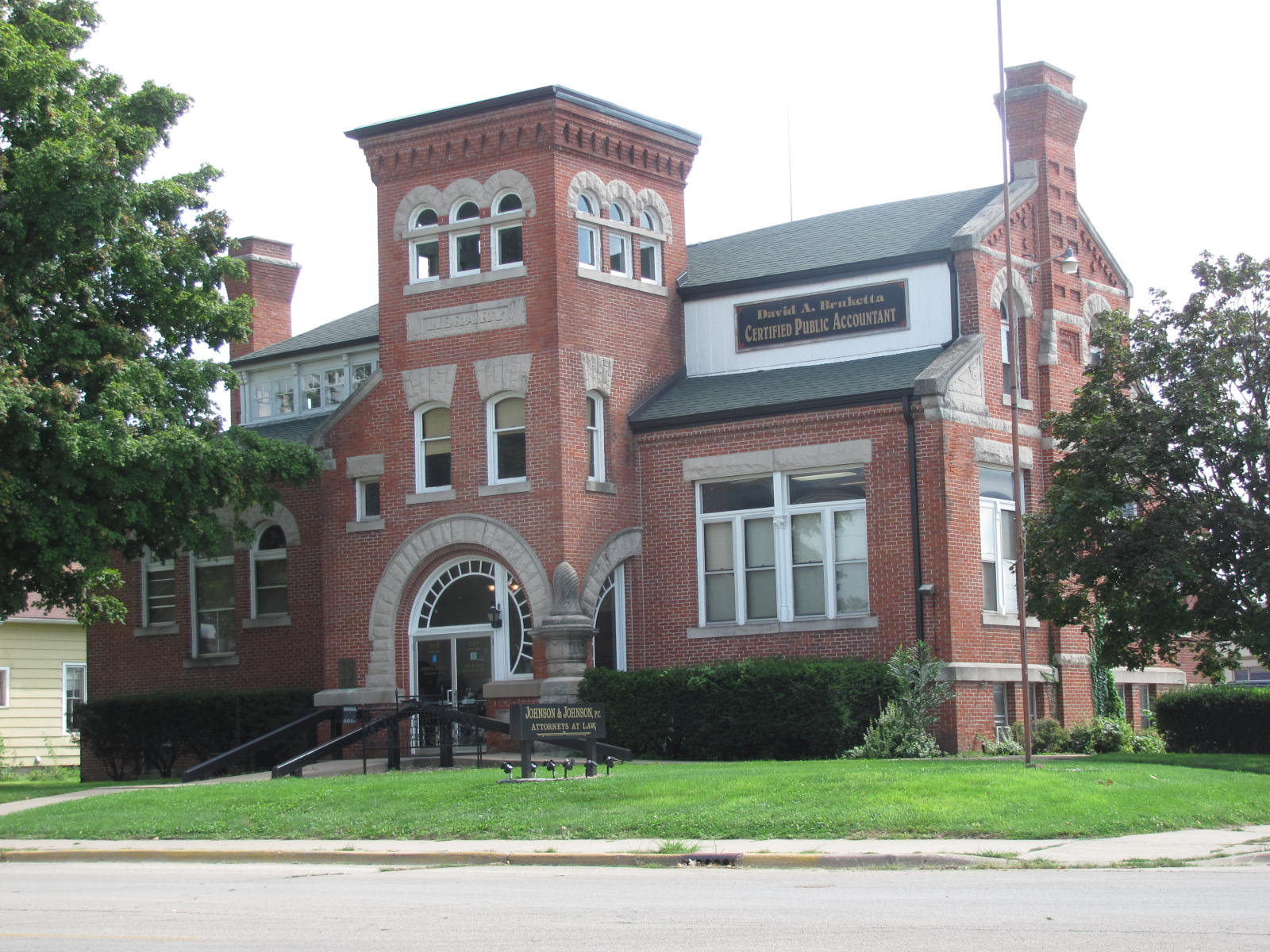

- Location within Illinois Location within the United States
- Interactive map showing the location of Parlin Library
- Location: 210 E. Chestnut St., Canton, Illinois
- Coordinates: 40°33′28″N 90°2′3″W
- Area: less than one acre
- Built: 1894
- Architect: Richardson and Salter
- Architectural style: Romanesque
- NRHP reference No.: 94000434
- Added to NRHP: May 6, 1994

The Parlin Library is an historic library building at 210 East Chestnut Street in Canton, Illinois, US. The building was built in 1893-94 for the city's library; while the city had earlier had two library associations, both had failed and the city had no public library at the time. William Parlin, Sr., the founder of Canton's most prosperous business in the Parlin & Orendorff Company, bequeathed the money for the library in his estate when he died in 1890; his estate provided US$8,000 for the building and its collection, while an additional $5,000 came from a library tax. The Peoria architectural firm of Richardson & Salter designed the Richardsonian Romanesque library. The library's collection included 1,000 books when it opened, increasing to 8,000 by 1908; it also included a large art gallery. The library served in its original capacity until 1958, when a new library opened and the old building became Canton's city hall.

The library was added to the National Register of Historic Places in 1994. It is one of four sites on the Register in Canton; the others are the Chicago, Burlington & Quincy Railroad Station, the Ulysses G. Orendorff House and the Orendorf Site.
