= Huron Consulting Group =

American management consulting firm

Huron Consulting Group Inc.
- Type: Public
- Traded as: Nasdaq: HURN; Russell 2000 Component
- Industry: Management consulting Business advisory Business performance management Healthcare; Life sciences Finance; Education
- Founded: 2002; 24 years ago
- Headquarters: 550 W. Van Buren Street, Chicago, Illinois, United States
- Area served: Worldwide
- Key people: Mark Hussey (CEO & President); John Kelly (CFO); Ronnie Dail(COO)
- Revenue: $1.36 billion (2023)
- Operating income: $125.3 million (2023)
- Net income: $62.5 million (2023)
- Total assets: $1.26 billion (2023)
- Total equity: $532.90 million (2023)
- Number of employees: 3,750 (12/31/2019)
- Website: www.huronconsultinggroup.com

Huron Consulting Group, commonly known as Huron, is an American management consulting company headquartered in Chicago, Illinois. The firm provides consulting and digital services to clients in the healthcare, life sciences, commercial, and higher education industries.

== History ==
Huron was founded in May 2002 in Chicago, Illinois, by a group of former employees of Arthur Andersen in the wake of that firm's high-profile collapse. The firm's headquarters remain in Chicago and it has global locations across North America, Europe and Asia Pacific.

In May 2004, Huron filed a registration statement with the Securities and Exchange Commission (SEC) relating to the initial public offering of its common stock. Huron Consulting Group Inc., the holding company, became a public company trading common stock on the NASDAQ Global Select Market exchange under the ticker "HURN" in October 2004.

In 2010, Huron acquired Click Commerce, a supplier of software-based applications and professional services to academic medical centers and research institutions. Terms of the acquisition were not disclosed.

In September 2013, Huron acquired Blue Stone International, LLC, a provider of Oracle Corporation professional services. Under the terms of the agreement, Huron acquired the assets of Blue Stone for $30 million in cash.

Huron acquired three other companies in 2014, Threshold Consulting, Inc., a consulting firm that provides customer relationship management consulting, cloud-based software as a service applications, business intelligence tools and data warehousing; Vonlay, LLC, a healthcare technology consulting firm; and The Frankel Group Associates LLC, a life sciences consulting firm.

In 2015, Huron acquired a number of other companies: the India affiliate of Rittman Mead Consulting Ltd., Rittman Mead India, a data and analytics consulting firm that specializes in the implementation of enterprise performance management and analytics systems; Cloud62, a firm specializing in complex Salesforce.com implementations and related cloud-based applications Studer Group, a professional services firm that consults with healthcare providers on clinical outcomes and financial results; and Sky Analytics, a Massachusetts-based provider of legal software for corporate law departments.

In February 2016, Huron acquired MyRounding, a firm specializing in digital health products. In May 2016, Huron acquired ADI Strategies, Inc., an enterprise performance management and business intelligence firm, while in July of that year Huron acquired Healthcare Services Management, Inc. (HSM), a healthcare information technology consultant.

In January 2017, Huron acquired Pope Woodhead & Associates, a UK-based life sciences firm.

Huron launched a college athletics business in 2020, providing consulting services to schools on finance, budgeting, conference realignment and fundraising.

In January 2022, Huron acquired AIMDATA, LLC, an enterprise information data consulting firm that specializes in Boomi.

== Controversies ==
In 2009, the U.S. Securities and Exchange Commission (SEC) announced an investigation in Huron for a series of major accounting errors dating over several years. Six related shareholder class-action lawsuits were also filed against the company. On July 31, 2009, Huron announced that the company would restate its financial statements for 2006, 2007, 2008, and first quarter 2009. The chairman of the board and CEO Gary Holdren, CFO Gary Burge, and Chief Accounting Officer Wayne Lipski all resigned.

In 2010, Huron reached a settlement in its shareholder lawsuits in return for a payment of $38m. On July 19, 2012, Huron announced it had reached a final settlement with the SEC resolving the previously disclosed SEC investigation into the Company's August 2009 restatement of its financial statements for the years ended 2006, 2007 and 2008 and the first quarter of 2009. The Company agreed to the settlement without admitting or denying the SEC's findings, but also agreed to pay a $1m civil fine.

Huron's role in higher education restructuring has attracted criticism. The company advocates for using post-Hurricane Katrina dispossessions as a model for how universities should operate, in the form of staff and faculty layoffs, program closures, salary reductions, and hiring freezes. Peter Stokes, Managing Director of Huron's Higher Education Practice, has argued that higher education institutions should align their curriculums with corporate needs.

Huron's austerity-based recommendations led to major layoffs and the termination of many non-STEM programs at the University of Wisconsin in 2017, the University of New Hampshire in 2019, and the New School in 2022. In 2023, faculty at West Virginia University stated that Huron had provided "ill-informed consulting and faulty data" which contributed to the institution's major budget shortfall, debt crisis, and program cuts.
