= Great West Truck Show =

Heavy and medium duty truck show

The Great West Truck Show (GWTS) is a heavy and medium duty truck show held each June in Paradise, Nevada, USA. GWTS is produced by the Randall-Reilly Events Group, a division of Randall-Reilly Publishing.

== GWTS 2008 ==
The 2008 Great West Truck Show was held on June 26–28. The contracted exhibit space grew from 86,550 net square feet in 2007 to 133,900 in 2008, a total increase of 54.7 percent.

The 2008 GWTS attracted 18,716 trucking industry attendees which was an increase of 5.3 percent from the 2007 show. 76 percent of attendees indicated that they made purchasing decisions. With respect to truck owners in attendance, the number dramatically increased on average by 32.5 percent of those owning Class 6–8 trucks.

More than 400 companies exhibited at GWTS in 2008, including most of the major truck and trailer original equipment manufacturers.

== GWTS 2009 ==
In 2009, the Great West Show was held from June 25 to 27.
