= Higi =

American consumer health service

Higi SH LLC
- Company type: Public
- Industry: Health care
- Headquarters: Chicago
- Key people: Jeff Bennett, CEO through the sale to Modivcare in 2023
- Parent: Modivcare
- Website: higi.com

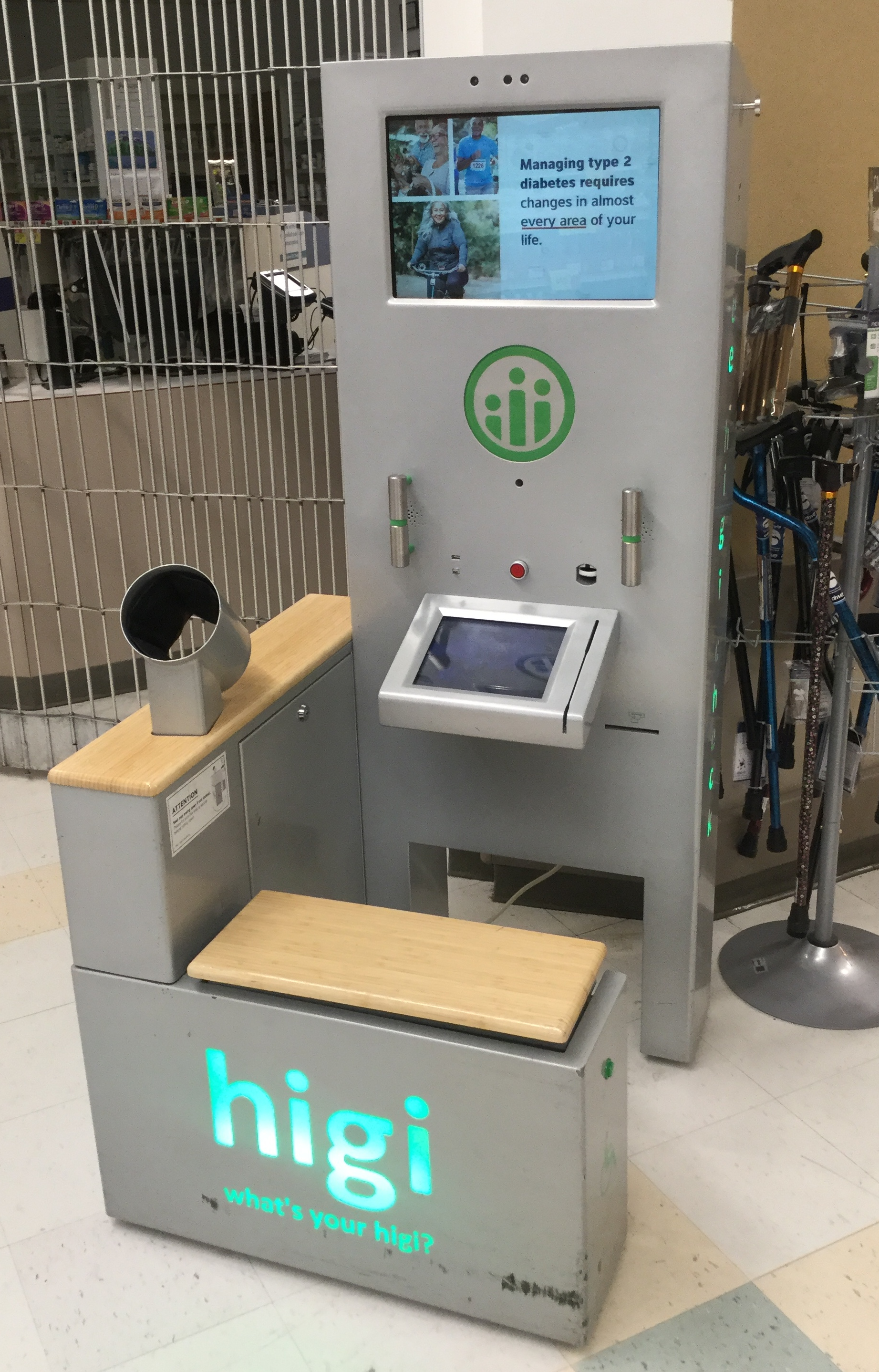
a Higi health station in a supermarket

Higi is a consumer health service that provides publicly accessible health stations, offers educational content and health risk tests and offers digital and home health tools. The stations appear in supermarkets, pharmacies, and other community locations. Higi has nearly 6,500 health stations in the United States. It was founded in 2012 by Michael W. Ferro Jr. while Khan Siddiqui was the founding CEO. In 2014, Michael Ferro sold his prior stake to William Wrigley Jr. II. At that time, the company combined with StayHealthy to form Higi SH, which was the operating entity of Higi until its sale to Babylon. In 2023, Babylon sold Higi to Modivcare.

== Company ==
Higi acquired Merge Health Information Kiosks for $2.75 million in 2012 and combined kiosk provider Stayhealthy in 2014. It received investment from BlueCross BlueShield's venture fund in 2017. Another notable investor is Lupe Fiasco, who accepted a role as creative director of the company. As part of the Blue Shield investment, Higi acquired a Seattle company called EveryMove.

In 2017, Sam's Club began offering Higi in its stores Higi also placed kiosks at Vanderbilt University and Wegman's supermarkets The stations are also at Publix, Meijer, Rite Aid and other stores.

In 2018, Higi raised a Series C round of $21.3 million from Flare Capital Partners and 7wireVentures.

Higi named a new Chairman Chris Kryder in August 2018.

In January 2022, Higi was acquired by Babylon Health.

In May 2023, Higi announced it had been acquired by ModivCare.
