= Skilling v. United States =

- Supreme Court of the United States

Argued March 1, 2010 Decided June 24, 2010
- Full case name: Jeffrey K. Skilling v. United States
- Docket no.: 08-1394
- Citations: 561 U.S. 358 (more) 130 S. Ct. 2896; 177 L. Ed. 2d 619

Case history
- Prior: Convictions affirmed, 554 F.3d 529 (5th Cir. 2009), cert. granted, 558 U.S. ___ (2009).
- Subsequent: Prison term of Jeffrey Skilling reduced from 24 years and 4 months to 14 years (minus time served)

Holding
- Pretrial publicity and community prejudice did not prevent Skilling from obtaining a fair trial. However, the honest services fraud statute, 18 U.S.C. §1346, is properly confined to cover only bribery and kickback schemes, which do not include Skilling's alleged misconduct. So construed, §1346 is not unconstitutionally vague.

Court membership
- Chief Justice John Roberts Associate Justices John P. Stevens · Antonin Scalia; Anthony Kennedy · Clarence Thomas; Ruth Bader Ginsburg · Stephen Breyer; Samuel Alito · Sonia Sotomayor

Case opinions
- Majority: Ginsburg, joined by Roberts, Stevens, Scalia, Kennedy, Thomas, Alito (Part I); Roberts, Scalia, Kennedy, Thomas (Part II); Roberts, Stevens, Breyer, Alito, Sotomayor (Part III)
- Concurrence: Scalia (in part), joined by Thomas; Kennedy (except Part III)
- Concurrence: Alito (in part)
- Concur/dissent: Sotomayor, joined by Stevens, Breyer

Laws applied
- U.S. Const. amend. V; 18 U.S.C. § 1346

Skilling v. United States, 561 U.S. 358 (2010), is a United States Supreme Court case interpreting the honest services fraud statute, 18 U.S.C. § 1346. The case involves former Enron CEO Jeffrey Skilling and the honest services fraud statute, which prohibits "a scheme or artifice to deprive another of the intangible right of honest services". The Court found the statute vague, meaning it was written in a manner that almost anyone could be convicted of the statute by engaging in most legal activities. However, the Court refused to void the statute as unconstitutionally vague. The Court decided to limit the application of the statute only to defendants who hold a fiduciary duty and they participate in bribery and kickback schemes. The Court supported its decision not to rule the statute void for vagueness on its obligation to construe and not condemn Congress' laws.

== Companion cases ==
In light of the court's findings, a similar case, Weyhrauch v. United States, involving former Alaska representative Bruce Weyhrauch, was returned to the United States Court of Appeals for the Ninth Circuit, where federal charges were eventually dropped.

The Supreme Court heard the Skilling case along with the similar Black v. United States (2010). The later case of Ciminelli v. United States (2023) further narrowed the application of the statute, quoting Skilling.
