= Stayhealthy =

Stayhealthy, Inc.
- Type: Private
- Industry: Healthcare
- Founded: 1995
- Headquarters: Monrovia, California
- Key people: John Collins, CEO
- Products: Stayhealthy® HealthCENTER Kiosk™ - Body Composition Analyzer - RT6 Research Tracker - Stayhealthy® Activity Monitor™ (SAM)
- Website: www.stayhealthy.com

Stayhealthy, Inc. is a privately held corporation that creates web-enabled healthcare monitoring products. It was founded in the dot-com era by CEO John Collins, and produces devices that monitor and measure such aspects of one's health like blood pressure, heart rate, body weight, body mass index, body composition, body fat (adipose tissue), visual perception, and calories burned.

The company's current products include: the Body Composition Analyzer, which reads an individual's body composition with no appreciable difference from hydrostatic weighing or the DXA scan; a HealthCENTER Kiosk, which has numerous configurations (Body Composition, Blood Pressure, Weight, Hearing, and Vision); Research Activity Monitor; and the Stayhealthy Activity Monitor (SAM) calorie tracker.

In May 2011, Tommy Thompson, former secretary of the U.S. Department of Health & Human Services and Governor of Wisconsin, was elected to serve as chairman of the board.

The company has a deal with Albertsons to place kiosks in their stores.

The company has a deal with SuperValu (United States) to place kiosks in their stores.

The company has a deal with Kroger to place kiosks in their stores.

On 13 March 2004, Stayhealthy sued AmerisourceBergen.

In 2005, Stayhealthy unveiled the Fitness Expert product, a fusion of the Body Composition Analyzer and the Calorie Tracker, which was to be sold via multi-level marketing company Quixtar. This deal has since fallen through.

The company was acquired by higi in 2014.
