= Pern (disambiguation) =

Pern is a fictional planet, the setting for the Dragonriders of Pern novel series.

Pern or PERN may also refer to:

== Organisations ==
- PERN, the Pakistan Educational Research Network, a network that connects universities and research institutes via high-speed Internet
- PERN Przyjaźń SA, a Polish oil transportation and storage company

== Places ==
- Pern, Lot, Occitania, France
- Pernem railway station, Goa, India

== Other uses ==
- European honey buzzard, a bird of prey also known as the pern
- The title character of The Life of Rock with Brian Pern, a British spoof-documentary series
