= Sun-Times Media Group =

Chicago-based newspaper publisher

- Industry: Newspaper holding company
- Founded: 1986
- Headquarters: Chicago, Illinois, United States
- Products: Newspapers

Sun-Times Media Group (formerly Hollinger International) was a Chicago-based newspaper holding company. The company formerly owned the Chicago Sun-Times until its acquisition by ownership group ST Acquisition Holdings in 2017.

== History ==
Sun-Times Media Group was founded in 1986 under the name American Publishing Company, as a holding company for Hollinger Inc.'s American properties. It focused on newspapers, mostly in smaller markets. In February 1994, it acquired the Chicago Sun-Times, holding an initial public offering (IPO) to fund the acquisition. At the time, it was the fifteenth-largest U.S. newspaper group. It changed its name to Hollinger International in 1994.

Hollinger's non-American properties, which included The Daily Telegraph and The Jerusalem Post, were added to the company in 1996, and its Canadian papers in 1997. It created the National Post from the Financial Post in 1998.

That year, it began a process of shrinking the company, selling many of its small papers to the private equity firm Leonard Green & Partners, who formed Liberty Group Publishing. In 2000, it sold most of the rest to four media companies (Bradford Publications Company, Community Newspaper Holdings, Paxton Media Group, and Forum Communications). Its Canadian holdings, notably the National Post, several smaller papers, and a majority stake in the Southam newspaper chain, were sold to CanWest in 2000 in connection with Conrad Black renouncing his Canadian citizenship to gain a British peerage. That year, Hollinger International bought the Chicago-area publications of Copley Press (The Herald News, The Beacon-News, The Courier-News, and Lake County News-Sun, along with several smaller papers).

Conrad Black was fired by the Hollinger International board in 2004 for fraud. He attempted to sell his stake to the Barclay brothers in January 2004 and the brothers launched a takeover bid for the rest of Hollinger International. However the sale was blocked by a judge in the United States after the company's board lodged a court action against the sale.

The Barclay brothers later bought The Telegraph Group which included The Daily Telegraph, The Sunday Telegraph, and The Spectator. On November 16, 2004, the sale of The Jerusalem Post to Mirkaei Tikshoret, a Tel Aviv–based publisher of Israeli newspapers, was announced. CanWest Global Communications, Canada's biggest media concern, announced it has agreed to take a 50 percent stake in The Jerusalem Post after Mirkaei buys the property. In February 2006, Hollinger sold substantially all of its Canadian assets.

The corporation's name was changed to Sun-Times Media Group on July 17, 2006.

On March 31, 2009, the company filed for bankruptcy protection under Chapter 11 of the United States Code.

In September 2009, Chicago financier James C. Tyree and a team of investors had a $5 million bid accepted to purchase the Sun-Times Media Group, contingent on the paper's unions accepting deep compensation cuts and work-rule changes. The purchase was completed the next month.

Tyree died suddenly in March 2011. Jeremy Halbreich, chief executive, said that Tyree will be greatly missed and that his death will make no changes in the media company's strategy.

Since the Tyree-Halbreich takeover, the organization has shown accelerating declines in circulation, advertising revenue and quality of editorial content. Industry analysts have repeatedly pointed to the group's failure to craft a competitive online product as evidence of continued decline. On December 6, 2011, the company announced it will institute a paywall to access its online content from December 8, 2011.

Later in December 2011, Chicago investment group Wrapports, L.L.C., led by Chairman Michael W. Ferro Jr. & CEO Timothy Knight, bought the properties of Sun-Times Media Holdings.

On July 13, 2017, it was reported that a consortium consisting of private investors and the Chicago Federation of Labor led by businessman and former Chicago alderman Edwin Eisendrath through his company ST Acquisition Holdings, had acquired the Sun-Times Media Group from then-owner Wrapports, beating out Chicago-based publishing company Tronc (formerly Tribune Publishing Company) for ownership.

In March 2019, a new ownership group took over and took control of the Sun-Times from the previous union ownership. The group, Sun-Times Investment Holdings LLC, was backed by prominent Chicago investors Michael Sacks and Rocky Wirtz.

== Corporate governance ==
November 17, 2003

- Conrad Black resigns as chairman after an internal inquiry alleges that Black had received more than $7 million in unauthorized payments of company funds.

January 14, 2004

- Hollinger International files a US$200 million lawsuit against Conrad Black and David Radler.

October 2005

- Gordon A. Paris, chairman of the board of directors, president, chief executive officer and director
- Paul B. Healy, vice president, corporate development and investor relations
- Peter K. Lane, vice president, chief financial officer
- Robert T. Smith, treasurer
- James R. Van Horn, vice president, general counsel and secretary
- John Cruickshank, chief operating officer, head of the Chicago group
- Members of the board of directors: Gordon Paris, Richard Burt, Daniel Colson, Cyrus Freidheim, Henry Kissinger, Shmuel Meitar, John O'Brien, Richard Perle, Graham Savage, Raymond G. H. Seitz, and James R. Thompson.

November 2006

- Cyrus Freidheim is hired as president and CEO.

February 2009

- Cyrus Freidheim resigns as CEO after New York–based hedge fund Davidson Kempner forces the ousting of all but one member of the board of directors.
- Jeremy Halbreich becomes the new chairman and interim chief executive.

March 2009

- Sun-Times Media Group filled for Chapter 11 bankruptcy.

December 2011

- Wrapports, L.L.C. acquired the Sun-Times Media Group.

July 2017

- ST Acquisition Holdings, a consortium of private investors and Chicago Federation of Labor acquired the Sun-Times Media Group from Wrapports.

March 2019

- Sun-Times Investment Holdings, LLC. acquired the assets of Sun-Times Media Group from previous consortium.

== See also ==
- Lerner Newspapers
