= Canton, Illinois =

Largest city in Fulton County, Illinois

- City
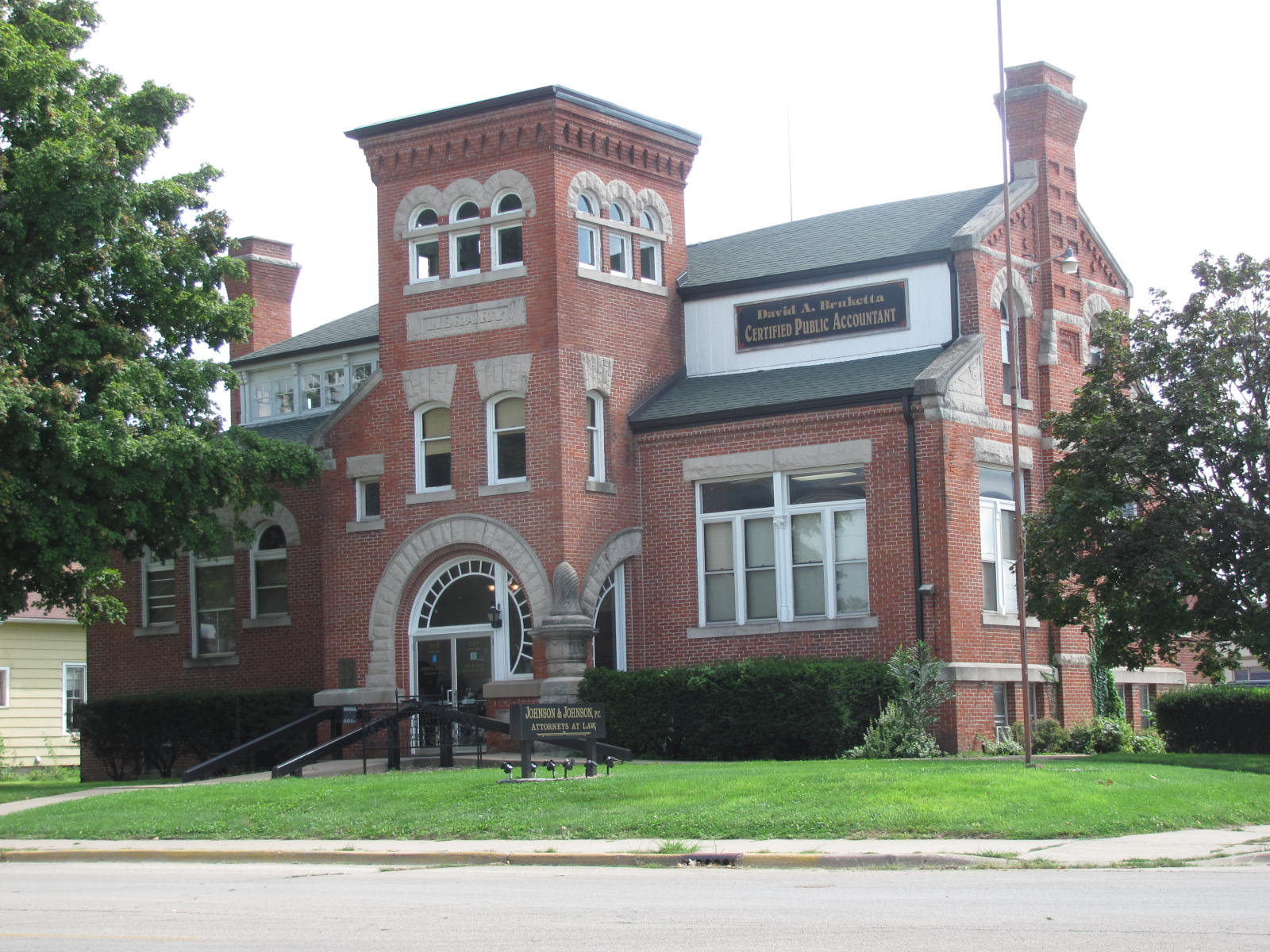
- Parlin Library
- Motto: "We do that here"
- Location of Canton in Fulton County, Illinois.

- Location within Fulton County Canton, Illinois (Illinois)
- Coordinates: 40°33′28″N 90°2′3″W
- Country: United States
- State: Illinois
- County: Fulton
- Townships: Canton, Buckheart
- Founded: 1825
- Incorporated: 1837

Government
  - Type: Mayor–council
  - Mayor: Kent McDowell

Area
  - Total: 8.02 sq mi (20.76 km^{2})
  - Land: 7.86 sq mi (20.35 km^{2})
  - Water: 0.16 sq mi (0.41 km^{2})
- Elevation: 640 ft (200 m)

Population (2020)
  - Total: 13,242
  - Estimate (2024): 12,896
  - Density: 1,685.1/sq mi (650.62/km^{2})
- Time zone: UTC−6 (CST)
  - Summer (DST): UTC−5 (CDT)
- ZIP code: 61520
- Area code: 309
- FIPS code: 17-11007
- GNIS ID: 2393732
- Website: www.cantonillinois.org

Canton is the largest city in Fulton County, Illinois, United States. The population was 13,242 at the 2020 census, down from 14,704 at the 2010 census. The Canton Micropolitan Statistical Area covers all of Fulton County; it is, in turn, part of the wider Peoria–Canton, Illinois Combined Statistical Area (CSA).

== History ==
Canton was founded in 1825 by settler Isaac Swan, who believed his new town and Canton, China, were antipodes.

Swan, his infant child, and three other people died in a devastating tornado in June 1835. "Isaac Swan and his child were found in the wreckage of their cabin, the baby dying in its mother's arms," leading some to conclude that the tornado represented divine retribution for the city allowing a circus performance the previous week. The city was hit by another tornado, this one an F-3, on July 23, 1975. Two people were killed, and the storm, deemed the 1975 Canton Tornado, caused major damage to the downtown area.

On September 13, 1967, Los Angeles rock band The Doors played a concert at Canton High School.

Much of the city, particularly the northern portion, has been undermined by room and pillar extraction of coal that took place in the 1800s.

Central Illinois Energy, a locally financed cooperative, began planning for a corn-fermentation ethanol plant in 2002. Construction and finance delays resulted in its opening in 2007, approximately 4 miles (6 km) south of the city. Beset by financial problems and construction delays on the plant, the cooperative declared bankruptcy. Central Illinois Energy's assets were bought by a private company. Construction was completed, and the plant began production in the summer of 2008. It was renamed Riverland Biofuels.

In December 2008, Cook Medical announced that it would open a new medical device factory at the old International Harvester site. Company owner William "Bill" Cook had grown up in Canton and wanted to do something to help revitalize his home town community. Some of the costs related to Cook Medical were planned to be paid for with state funds: a $750,000 Community Development Assistance Program grant from the Illinois Department of Commerce and Economic Opportunity and a $1.1 million grant from the Illinois Department of Transportation for infrastructure improvements near the plant. Scott Eells, the chief operating officer for Cook Group, has said that the factory will eventually be 45,000 square feet (4,200 m^{2}), with more than 300 employees. Bill Cook had previously announced he was buying and renovating several old Canton buildings, including the 1883 Randolph Building on the town square. Cook purchased four buildings in downtown Canton, a shopping center, the site where the International Harvester plant was located as well as constructing the new Canton Harvester Inn boutique hotel and another factory—COOK Polymer. The Lewis Pharmacy Building was purchased and restored. The Randolph Building is another Canton purchase made by Cook. The main floor offers store fronts and there are apartments for rent on the second level. Also purchased is the Fulton Square Shopping Center.

On November 16, 2016, a gas explosion killed an Ameren worker who was fixing a gas leak, sent 12 to the local hospital, and demolished an adjacent building on 1st Avenue that was attached to the Opera House. The next day the Opera House and two other buildings were declared beyond repair and condemned, an additional building declared uninhabitable until repaired, and 48 other buildings noted as damaged but repairable.

== Geography ==
Canton is located in northeastern Fulton County at 40°33′28″N 90°02′03″W. Illinois Routes 9 and 78 pass through the downtown together. IL 9 leads east 8 miles (13 km) to Banner near the Illinois River and west 27 miles (43 km) to Bushnell, while IL 78 leads north 10 miles (16 km) to Farmington and south 11 miles (18 km) to Little America in the Illinois River valley.

According to the 2010 census, Canton has a total area of 8.063 square miles (20.88 km^{2}), of which 7.9 square miles (20.46 km^{2}) (or 97.98%) is land and 0.163 square miles (0.42 km^{2}) (or 2.02%) is water.

== Demographics ==
Historical population
Census	Pop.	Note	%±
1840	762		—
1850	1,568		105.8%
1860	2,373		51.3%
1870	3,308		39.4%
1880	3,762		13.7%
1890	5,604		49.0%
1900	6,564		17.1%
1910	10,453		59.2%
1920	10,928		4.5%
1930	11,718		7.2%
1940	11,577		−1.2%
1950	11,927		3.0%
1960	13,588		13.9%
1970	14,217		4.6%
1980	14,626		2.9%
1990	13,922		−4.8%
2000	15,288		9.8%
2010	14,704		−3.8%
2020	13,242		−9.9%
U.S. Decennial Census

=== 2020 census ===
As of the 2020 census, Canton had a population of 13,242, with 5,222 households and 2,871 families. The median age was 41.5 years. 18.7% of residents were under the age of 18 and 19.6% of residents were 65 years of age or older. For every 100 females there were 117.2 males, and for every 100 females age 18 and over there were 121.8 males age 18 and over.

98.2% of residents lived in urban areas, while 1.8% lived in rural areas.

Of the 5,222 households in Canton, 25.4% had children under the age of 18 living in them. 38.7% were married-couple households, 20.5% were households with a male householder and no spouse or partner present, and 32.6% were households with a female householder and no spouse or partner present. About 37.3% of all households were made up of individuals, and 18.1% had someone living alone who was 65 years of age or older.

There were 5,863 housing units, of which 10.9% were vacant. The homeowner vacancy rate was 3.2% and the rental vacancy rate was 10.2%.

Racial composition as of the 2020 census
Race	Number	Percent
White	11,246	84.9%
Black or African American	1,074	8.1%
American Indian and Alaska Native	26	0.2%
Asian	46	0.3%
Native Hawaiian and Other Pacific Islander	3	0.0%
Some other race	381	2.9%
Two or more races	466	3.5%
Hispanic or Latino (of any race)	489	3.7%

== Media ==
Canton has a daily newspaper, The Daily Ledger, and three radio stations: WBYS and WPZA, and WILP, known as Q98.1. There is also a weekly newspaper, "The Fulton Democrat", and a weekly shopping publication, "The Independent Shopper".

== Notable people ==
- Granville Barrere (1829–1889), U.S. Representative from Illinois
- Ethan Blackaby (1940–2022), Major League Baseball outfielder for the Milwaukee Braves
- Tony Blazine (1912–1963), NFL football player (1935–1941)
- Burnett M. Chiperfield (1870–1940), U.S. Representative from Illinois
- Silas B. Cobb (1812–1900), industrialist (born in Vermont)
- William "Bill" Cook (1931–2011), medical device entrepreneur and historic preservationist, founder of the Cook Group
- Dave Downey (1941–2025), basketball player for University of Illinois
- Tim Drummond (1941–2015), bass guitarist
- Ralph Dunn (1900–1968), film, television, and stage actor
- Charles Duryea (1861–1938), automobile manufacturer
- Bill Edley (born 1948), Illinois state legislator and businessman
- Lee Eyerly (1892–1963), civil aviation pioneer and amusement ride manufacturer
- Jack Fisk (1945–), Academy Award-nominated production designer and art director
- R. Thomas Flynn (1938–), retired president of Monroe Community College
- James "Boomer" Grigsby (1981–), fullback with the Kansas City Chiefs (2005–2007) and Miami Dolphins (2008)
- Mike Grzanich (1972–), pitcher for the Houston Astros
- Art Haege (1937–2007), football player and coach
- Harry Jacobs (1937–2021), linebacker at Bradley University and for the New England Patriots and Buffalo Bills
- Elizabeth A. Kovachevich, United States District Court judge
- Louisa McCall (1824–1907), pioneer bank director
- Barbara Mertz (1927–2013), mystery novelist
- Steven R. Nagel (1946–2014), astronaut
- Raymond Phineas Stearns (1904–1970), historian
- Ian Wolfe (1896–1992), television and movie actor, poet
