= Compello =

Norwegian IT company

- Industry: Information technology
- Founded: 2011
- Headquarters: Oslo, Norway
- Key people: Torgeir Letting (CEO)
- Products: EDI, eInvoice and Invoice Approval
- Website: www.compello.com

Compello AS is a Norwegian IT company established in 2011 after the merger of Client Computing Europe ASA and Compello Software AS. The company develops solutions for automated data flow comprising solutions for EDI, eInvoice and Invoice Approval. The company is 100% owned by Etrinell AS with headquarters in Oslo, Norway.

More than 80 people are currently employed in Compello based in Oslo, Sandefjord, Stockholm, and Colombo. The company collaborates with Microsoft and was chosen Best Norwegian Independent Software Partner at Microsoft's annual Partner Conference in Washington, D.C., in 2014.

In 2018, Compello won the ODA Award Organization, a role model prize of promoting women in tech.

== History ==
In 2018, Compello's German business was sold out from the Compello group.

Client Computing Europe ASA merged with Compello Software AS in 2011, and rebranded at the same time to Compello AS. Client Computing was established in 1995, and focused originally on message flow and EDI-messages to the power and textile industries. The business expanded to Sweden in 1998 by acquiring the EDI-part of Posten/SDS, and into Germany in 2006 through GLI GmbH.

In 2004, the company invested in Euronova AS, thereby accessing e-invoicing. Euronova later became a fully owned subsidiary named Client Computing Norway AS.

The Norwegian EDI and eInvoice activities were organised under Client Computing Utility AS and Client Computing Norway AS. In late 2010, Client Computing Utility AS was merged with Client Computing Norway AS. Client Computing Norway AS merged with Compello Software AS in 2012.

Compello Software was established in 1997, focusing on electronic invoice approval. This covers invoice scanning, interpretation (OCR), workflow and ERP integration. The company merged with Client Computing Europe ASA in 2011.
