= DocStar =

Software company based in New York, US

- Type: Private
- Industry: Software; Enterprise content management Document management Accounts payable
- Founded: 1996
- Headquarters: Schenectady, NY
- Key people: Tom Franceski, Vice President & GM; Gregg Laird, VP of Product Management, Strategy & Development
- Products: DocStar ECM; DocStar AP Automation; DocStar 3fourteen DocStar Rebound; DocStar ECM for ArcGIS
- Number of employees: 60
- Website: Docstar.com

DocStar is a software company that provides document management software, enterprise content management, accounts payable automation programs, and electronic forms, available on-premises or as a cloud-hosted service in the SaaS model. Features include document control, records management, document imaging, intelligent data capture, invoice processing, workflow and business process automation. DocStar software integrates with third-party business applications.

DocStar is headquartered in Schenectady, New York, and is the primary document management service to over 2,000 organizations across North America and the UK.

== History ==
DocStar was formerly known as BitWise Designs Inc. and was founded in 1985, by Rensselaer Polytechnic Institute students John Botti and Ira Whitman. In 1992, BitWise began public trading under the stock symbol BTWS. In 1994, the document imaging division of BitWise was founded as DocStar.

In March 2001, BitWise designs officially changed its name to AuthentiDate Holding Corporation and began trading under the NASDAQ symbol ADAT. AuthentiDate was the first company to gain official USPS Electronic Postmark (EPM). At present, Authentidate remains the official EPM provider to the United States Postal Service. In 2005, AuthentiDate moved its headquarters from Schenectady, NY, to Berkeley Heights, NJ. The DocStar division remained in Schenectady.

On January 3, 2017, DocStar was purchased by Epicor Software Corporation. Astria Solutions Group acquired DocStar in June 2007, from AuthentiDate Holding Corp.

== See also ==
- Accounts payable automation
- Document management system
- Enterprise content management
- Business process automation
- Document imaging
- Records management
