= Cleo Communications =

American software company

Cleo Communications LLC
- Type: Privately held company
- Industry: Software
- Founded: 1976
- Headquarters: Rockford, Illinois, United States
- Key people: Mahesh Rajasekharan (President and CEO)
- Number of employees: 400
- Website: www.cleo.com

Cleo Communications LLC, simply referred to as Cleo, is a privately held software company founded in 1976. The company develops electronic data interchange (EDI) and supply chain orchestration software, including its Cleo Integration Cloud platform.

== History ==
Cleo originally began as a division of Phone 1 Inc., a voice data gathering systems manufacturer, and built data concentrators and terminal emulators — multi-bus computers, modems, and terminals to interface with IBM mainframes via bisynchronous communications. The company then began developing mainframe middleware in the 1980s, and with the rise of the PC, moved into B2B data communications and secure file transfer software.

Cleo Communications was acquired in 2012 by Global Equity Partners along with other investment companies. Since being acquired in 2012, the company’s offerings have evolved into Cleo Integration Cloud, a platform for enterprise business integration.

== Business ==
Based in Rockford, Illinois (USA), with offices in Chicago, Pennsylvania, London, and Bangalore, Cleo has about 400 employees and more than 4,100 direct customers. The company's flagship offering, Cleo Integration Cloud, is a supply chain orchestration and B2B integration platform that supports EDI, API, and application integration, data movement, and data transformation.

Previous products since folded into Cleo Integration Cloud include Cleo Harmony, Cleo Clarify, and Cleo Jetsonic.

Cleo solutions span a variety of industries, including manufacturing, logistics and supply chain, retail, third-party logistics, warehouse management and transportation management, healthcare, financial services and government.

In May 2023, Cleo announced it entered a global partnership with consulting and multinational information technology services company, Cognizant (NASDAQ: CTSH). Together, the companies announced CCIB, powered by Cleo, which is a B2B iPaaS solution that provides B2B managed services with built-in, scalable infrastructure on the cloud. The solution comprises elements from Cleo's flagship offering, Cleo Integration Cloud.

== Expansion ==
In June 2014, Cleo opened an office in Chicago for members of its support and Ashok and teams. In 2014, the company hired Jorge Rodriguez as Senior Vice President of Product Development and John Thielens as Vice President of Technology. Cleo hired Dave Brunswick as Vice President of Solutions for North America in 2015, and Cleo hired Ken Lyons to lead global sales in 2016. Lyons now serves as the company's Chief Revenue Officer. More recent additions to the company's leadership team include Vipin Mittal, Vice President, Customer Experience, and Tushar Patel, CMO.

Cleo opened its product development facility in Bengaluru, India, in 2015 and expanded its hybrid cloud integration teams into a new office there in 2017. The company also opened a London office in 2016 and expanded its network of channel partners in EMEA.

In 2016, Cleo acquired EXTOL International, a Pottsville, Pa.-based business and EDI integration and data transformation company for an undisclosed amount. In 2017, the company moved its headquarters from Loves Park, Illinois, to Rockford.

In 2021 the company received a significant growth investment from H.I.G. Capital, which acquired Cleo from Alpine Investors and Peterson Partners.

In July 2022, Cleo opened a new, 5,000-square-foot office located in Chicago's Loop.

In November 2022, Cleo launched an accelerator for Microsoft Dynamics 365 SCM-to-X12 and a connector for Microsoft Dynamics 365 Business Central. These pre-built solutions allow businesses and users to quickly build integration flows that integrate their digital ecosystems. In March 2023, Cleo released CIC PAVE (Procurement Automation and Vendor Enablement). PAVE provides customers with enhanced supply chain visibility via a supplier portal that allows the customer to keep vendor interaction in a single location, even if they cannot use EDI or have API-ready applications.

In December 2023, Cleo acquired ECS International, an integration technology company based in the Netherlands.

In January 2025, Cleo acquired DataTrans Solutions (DTS), a cloud-based procurement automation and Web EDI provider.

== Certification ==
Cleo regularly submits its products to Drummond Group's interoperability software testing for AS2, AS3 and ebMS 2.0.

In January 2020, Cleo announced that its new application connector for Acumatica ERP has been recognized as an Acumatica-Certified Application (ACA). The company also holds SOC 2, Type 2 certification.

== Awards ==
Cleo was a Xerox partner of the year award for five years, from 2009 to 2014. The Cleo Streem solution integrates with Xerox multi-function products, providing customers with solutions for network fax and interactive messaging needs. Cleo was named to Food Logistics' FL100+ Top Software and Technology Providers Lists in 2016, 2017, 2019 and 2020.

Cleo CEO, Mahesh Rajasekharan was named an Ernst & Young Entrepreneur Of The Year 2022 Midwest Award winner. Rajasekharan is serving as a judge for the 2023 Ernst & Young Entrepreneur Of the Year Awards.

As of April 2022, Cleo has been named a Leader in EDI on the G2 Grid, a peer-to-peer review site, for 20 straight quarters. In Spring 2023, Cleo won 23 G2 awards—including EDI Leader Enterprise, MFT Leader Enterprise, On-Premise Data Integration Best Support Enterprise, and iPaaS High Performer Asia.
