= X12 Document List =

Approved EDI ANSI X12 transaction sets

The following is a list of all ASC X12 transaction sets across all releases.

== X12C: Communications and Controls ==
102	Associated Data
242	Data Status Tracking
815	Cryptographic Service Message
864	Text Message
868	Electronic Form Structure
993	Secured Receipt or Acknowledgment
996	File Transfer
997	Functional Acknowledgment
999	Implementation Acknowledgment

== X12F: Finance ==
103	Abandoned Property Filings
105	Business Entity Filings
113	Election Campaign and Lobbyist Reporting
130	Student Educational Record (Transcript)
131	Student Educational Record (Transcript) Acknowledgment
132	Human Resource Information
133	Educational Institution Record
135	Student Aid Origination Record
138	Educational Testing and Prospect Request and Report
139	Student Loan Guarantee Result
144	Student Loan Transfer and Status Verification
146	Request for Student Educational Record (Transcript)
147	Response to Request for Student Educational Record (Transcript)
149	Notice of Tax Adjustment or Assessment
150	Tax Rate Notification
151	Electronic Filing of Tax Return Data Acknowledgment
152	Statistical Government Information
153	Unemployment Insurance Tax Claim or Charge Information
154	Secured Interest Filing
155	Business Credit Report
157	Notice of Power of Attorney
158	Tax Jurisdiction Sourcing
175	Court and Law Enforcement Notice
176	Court Submission
179	Environmental Compliance Reporting
185	Royalty Regulatory Report
188	Educational Course Inventory
189	Application for Admission to Educational Institutions
190	Student Enrollment Verification
191	Student Loan Pre-Claims and Claims
194	Grant or Assistance Application
195	Federal Communications Commission (FCC) License Application
196	Contractor Cost Data Reporting
197	Real Estate Title Evidence
198	Loan Verification Information
199	Real Estate Settlement Information
200	Mortgage Credit Report
201	Residential Loan Application
202	Secondary Mortgage Market Loan Delivery
203	Secondary Mortgage Market Investor Report
205	Mortgage Note
206	Real Estate Inspection
245	Real Estate Tax Service Response
248	Account Assignment/Inquiry and Service/Status
259	Residential Mortgage Insurance Explanation of Benefits
260	Application for Mortgage Insurance Benefits
261	Real Estate Information Request
262	Real Estate Information Report
263	Residential Mortgage Insurance Application Response
264	Mortgage Loan Default Status
265	Real Estate Title Insurance Services Order
266	Mortgage or Property Record Change Notification
280	Voter Registration Information
283	Tax or Fee Exemption Certification
288	Wage Determination
521	Income or Asset Offset
527	Material Due-In and Receipt
540	Notice of Employment Status
810	Invoice
811	Consolidated Service Invoice/Statement
812	Credit/Debit Adjustment
813	Electronic Filing of Tax Return Data
814	General Request, Response or Confirmation
819	Joint Interest Billing and Operating Expense Statement
820	Payment Order/Remittance Advice
821	Financial Information Reporting
822	Account Analysis
823	Lockbox
824	Application Advice
826	Tax Information Exchange
827	Financial Return Notice
828	Debit Authorization
829	Payment Cancellation Request
831	Application Control Totals
833	Mortgage Credit Report Order
844	Product Transfer Account Adjustment
849	Response to Product Transfer Account Adjustment
872	Residential Mortgage Insurance Application
880	Grocery Products Invoice

== X12I: Transportation ==
104	Air Shipment Information
106	Motor Carrier Rate Proposal
107	Request for Motor Carrier Rate Proposal
108	Response to a Motor Carrier Rate Proposal
109	Vessel Content Details
110	Air Freight Details and Invoice
114	Air Shipment Status Message
120	Vehicle Shipping Order
121	Vehicle Service
125	Multilevel Railcar Load Details
126	Vehicle Application Advice
127	Vehicle Baying Order
128	Dealer Information
129	Vehicle Carrier Rate Update
160	Transportation Automatic Equipment Identification
161	Train Sheet
163	Transportation Appointment Schedule Information
204	Motor Carrier Load Tender
210	Motor Carrier Freight Details and Invoice
211	Motor Carrier Bill of Lading
212	Motor Carrier Delivery Trailer Manifest
213	Motor Carrier Shipment Status Inquiry
214	Transportation Carrier Shipment Status Message
215	Motor Carrier Pickup Manifest
216	Motor Carrier Shipment Pickup Notification
217	Motor Carrier Loading and Route Guide
218	Motor Carrier Tariff Information
219	Logistics Service Request
220	Logistics Service Response
222	Cartage Work Assignment
223	Consolidators Freight Bill and Invoice
224	Motor Carrier Summary Freight Bill Manifest
225	Response to a Cartage Work Assignment
227	Trailer Usage Report
228	Equipment Inspection Report
240	Motor Carrier Package Status
250	Purchase Order Shipment Management Document
284	Commercial Vehicle Safety Reports
285	Commercial Vehicle Safety and Credentials Information Exchange
286	Commercial Vehicle Credentials
300	Reservation (Booking Request) (Ocean)
301	Confirmation (Ocean)
303	Booking Cancellation (Ocean)
304	Shipping Instructions
309	Customs Manifest
310	Freight Receipt and Invoice (Ocean)
311	Canada Customs Information
312	Arrival Notice (Ocean)
313	Shipment Status Inquiry (Ocean)
315	Status Details (Ocean)
317	Delivery/Pickup Order
319	Terminal Information
322	Terminal Operations and Intermodal Ramp Activity
323	Vessel Schedule and Itinerary (Ocean)
324	Vessel Stow Plan (Ocean)
325	Consolidation of Goods In Container
326	Consignment Summary List
350	Customs Status Information
352	Customs Carrier General Order Status
353	Customs Events Advisory Details
354	Customs Automated Manifest Archive Status
355	Customs Acceptance/Rejection
356	Customs Permit to Transfer Request
357	Customs In-Bond Information
358	Customs Consist Information
359	Customs Customer Profile Management
361	Carrier Interchange Agreement (Ocean)
404	Rail Carrier Shipment Information
410	Rail Carrier Freight Details and Invoice
412	Trailer or Container Repair Billing
414	Rail Carhire Settlements
417	Rail Carrier Waybill Interchange
418	Rail Advance Interchange Consist
419	Advance Car Disposition
420	Car Handling Information
421	Estimated Time of Arrival and Car Scheduling
422	Equipment Order
423	Rail Industrial Switch List
424	Rail Carrier Services Settlement
425	Rail Waybill Request
426	Rail Revenue Waybill
429	Railroad Retirement Activity
431	Railroad Station Master File
432	Rail Car Hire Rate Negotiation
433	Railroad Reciprocal Switch File
434	Railroad Mark Register Update Activity
435	Standard Transportation Commodity Code Master
436	Locomotive Information
437	Railroad Junctions and Interchanges Activity
440	Shipment Weights
451	Railroad Event Report
452	Railroad Problem Log Inquiry or Advice
453	Railroad Service Commitment Advice
455	Railroad Parameter Trace Registration
456	Railroad Equipment Inquiry or Advice
460	Railroad Price Distribution Request or Response
463	Rail Rate Reply
466	Rate Request
468	Rate Docket Journal Log
470	Railroad Clearance
475	Rail Route File Maintenance
485	Ratemaking Action
486	Rate Docket Expiration
490	Rate Group Definition
492	Miscellaneous Rates
494	Rail Scale Rates
601	Customs Export Shipment Information
602	Transportation Services Tender
603	Transportation Equipment Registration
622	Intermodal Ramp Activity
715	Intermodal Group Loading Plan
854	Shipment Delivery Discrepancy Information
858	Shipment Information
859	Freight Invoice
920	Loss or Damage Claim - General Commodities
924	Loss or Damage Claim - Motor Vehicle
925	Claim Tracer
926	Claim Status Report and Tracer Reply
928	Automotive Inspection Detail
980	Functional Group Totals
990	Response to a Load Tender
998	Set Cancellation

== X12M: Supply Chain ==
101	Name and Address Lists
140	Product Registration
141	Product Service Claim Response
142	Product Service Claim
143	Product Service Notification
159	Motion Picture Booking Confirmation
170	Revenue Receipts Statement
180	Return Merchandise Authorization and Notification
244	Product Source Information
249	Animal Toxicological Data
251	Pricing Support
290	Cooperative Advertising Agreements
501	Vendor Performance Review
503	Pricing History
504	Clauses and Provisions
511	Requisition
517	Material Obligation Validation
536	Logistics Reassignment
561	Contract Abstract
567	Contract Completion Status
568	Contract Payment Management Report
620	Excavation Communication
625	Well Information
650	Maintenance Service Order
753	Request for Routing Instructions
754	Routing Instructions
805	Contract Pricing Proposal
806	Project Schedule Reporting
816	Organizational Relationships
818	Commission Sales Report
830	Planning Schedule with Release Capability
832	Price/Sales Catalog
836	Procurement Notices
838	Trading Partner Profile
839	Project Cost Reporting
840	Request for Quotation
841	Specifications/Technical Information
842	Nonconformance Report
843	Response to Request for Quotation
845	Price Authorization Acknowledgment/Status
846	Inventory Inquiry/Advice
847	Material Claim
848	Material Safety Data Sheet
850	Purchase Order
851	Asset Schedule
852	Product Activity Data
853	Routing and Carrier Instruction
855	Purchase Order Acknowledgment
856	Ship Notice/Manifest
857	Shipment and Billing Notice
860	Purchase Order Change Request - Buyer Initiated
861	Receiving Advice/Acceptance Certificate
862	Shipping Schedule
863	Report of Test Results
865	Purchase Order Change Acknowledgment/Request - Seller Initiated
866	Production Sequence
867	Product Transfer and Resale Report
869	Order Status Inquiry
870	Order Status Report
871	Component Parts Content
873	Commodity Movement Services
874	Commodity Movement Services Response
875	Grocery Products Purchase Order
876	Grocery Products Purchase Order Change
877	Manufacturer Coupon Family Code Structure
878	Product Authorization/De-authorization
879	Price Information
881	Manufacturer Coupon Redemption Detail
882	Direct Store Delivery Summary Information
883	Market Development Fund Allocation
884	Market Development Fund Settlement
885	Retail Account Characteristics
886	Customer Call Reporting
887	Coupon Notification
888	Item Maintenance
889	Promotion Announcement
890	Contract & Rebate Management Transaction
891	Deduction Research Report
892	Trading Partner Performance Measurement
893	Item Information Request
894	Delivery/Return Base Record
895	Delivery/Return Acknowledgment or Adjustment
896	Product Dimension Maintenance
897	Data Synchronization
940	Warehouse Shipping Order
943	Warehouse Stock Transfer Shipment Advice
944	Warehouse Stock Transfer Receipt Advice
945	Warehouse Shipping Advice
947	Warehouse Inventory Adjustment Advice

== X12N: Insurance ==
100	Insurance Plan Description
111	Individual Insurance Policy and Client Information
112	Property Damage Report
124	Vehicle Damage
148	Report of Injury, Illness or Incident
186	Insurance Underwriting Requirements Reporting
187	Premium Audit Request and Return
252	Insurance Producer Administration
255	Underwriting Information Services
256	Periodic Compensation
267	Individual Life, Annuity and Disability Application
268	Annuity Activity
269	Health Care Benefit Coordination Verification
270	Eligibility, Coverage or Benefit Inquiry
271	Eligibility, Coverage or Benefit Information
272	Property and Casualty Loss Notification
273	Insurance/Annuity Application Status
274	Healthcare Provider Information
275	Patient Information
276	Health Care Claim Status Request
277	Health Care Information Status Notification
278	Health Care Services Review Information
362	Cargo Insurance Advice of Shipment
500	Medical Event Reporting
834	Benefit Enrollment and Maintenance
835	Health Care Claim Payment/Advice
837	Health Care Claim

== See also ==
- Electronic Data Interchange
- EDIFACT
- X12 EDIFACT Mapping
- ANSI 834 Enrollment Implementation Format
