= City ledger =

In hotel accounting, the city ledger is the collection of accounts belonging to non-registered guests, distinct from the transient ledger (also called the guest or front-office ledger), which is the accounts receivable for guests who are currently registered.

== Overview ==
=== Accounts receivable ===
The vast majority of accounts in the city ledger are accounts receivable (one notable exception is the advance deposit account discussed below, which is an account payable).

Included in the city ledger are accounts belonging to various companies that utilize the hotel for meeting space and for lodging travelling executives. Instead of billing separately for each individual service that the hotel provides, the charges are accumulated in the company's city ledger account. The hotel then periodically sends the bill to the company.

=== Credit card accounts ===
The second major component of the city ledger are credit card accounts. When a guest uses a credit card, this transaction creates an account receivable for the hotel to be collected from the credit card company. This account receivable is recorded in the credit card company's city ledger account.

Advance deposits are an example of an account payable found in the city ledger. When a guest pays a deposit prior to registration, the hotel incurs an account payable to the guest for services to be rendered in the future. Advance deposits from all guests are collected in a common advance deposit account. This amount is then transferred back to the guest's front-office account (folio) upon check-in.

=== Other uses of the term ===
In smaller businesses, the term "city ledger" is also used as a category to keep unpaid bills under general-manager responsibility until they are settled by the guest.
