= Maritime data standards =

Maritime data standards include the following modern standard operating procedures for data.

== Data Interchange Standards ==
- EDIMAR Electronic data interchange for the European Maritime industry (engineering data)
- MTML data interchange standard for purchasing
- SFI Coding and Classification System provides a functional subdivision of technical and financial ship or rig information
- Shipdex A modified subset of S1000D to transfer technical data typically used in equipment manuals

== Data interchange platforms ==
- SafeSeaNet: the European platform for maritime data exchange

== Encryption Standards ==
- S-63 standard for encrypting, securing and compressing electronic navigational chart (ENC) data.
