= AS1 =

AS1 or AS-1 may refer to:

- ActionScript version 1
- As One (Hong Kong band)
- AS1 (networking)
- Raduga KS-1 Komet, a missile referred to as the AS-1 'Kennel' by the West
- RuPaul's Drag Race All Stars 1 (season 1)
- Smith & Wesson AS, a 12-gauge select-fire shotgun.
- Air Specialist (class 1), a rank previously known as Senior aircraftman in the Royal Air Force
- AS-1, a Soviet-era prototype assault rifle that led to the AN-94
