= ANSI 834 Enrollment Implementation Format =

Standard file format in the USA

The X12 834 EDI Enrollment Implementation Format is a standard file format in the United States for electronically exchanging health plan enrollment data between employers and health insurance carriers.

The Health Insurance Portability and Accountability Act (HIPAA) requires that all health plans or health insurance carriers accept a standard enrollment format: ANSI 834A Version 5010.

An 834 file contains a string of data elements, with each representing a fact, such as a subscriber’s name, hire date, etc. The entire string is called a transaction set.

The 834 is used to transfer enrollment information from the sponsor of the insurance coverage, benefits, or policy to a payer. The format attempts to meet the health care industry's specific need for the initial enrollment and subsequent maintenance of individuals who are enrolled in insurance products.

== Layout ==
An example layout of an X12 834 Version 005010 file is shown below. Each line starts with a code to identify the type of data that follows, with individual pieces of data separated by an asterisk. The tilde indicates the end of that section.

INS*Y*18*030*XN*A*E**FT~
REF*0F*881019999~
REF*1L*Blue~
DTP*336*D8*20070101~
NM1*IL*1*BLUTH*LUCILLE****34*881019999~
N3*224 N DES PLAINES*6TH FLOOR~
N4*CHICAGO*IL*60661*USA~
DMG*D8*19720121*F*M~
HD*030**VIS**EMP~
DTP*348*D8*20111016~
INS*N*19*030*XN*A*E***N*N~
REF*0F*881019999~
REF*1L*Blue~
DTP*357*D8*20111015~
NM1*IL*1*BLUTH*BUSTER~
N3*224 N DES PLAINES*6TH FLOOR~
N4*CHICAGO*IL*60661*USA~
DMG*D8*19911015*M~
HD*030**VIS~
DTP*348*D8*20110101~
DTP*349*D8*20111015~

== See also ==
- X12 Document List
