= Minimal Lower Layer Protocol =

Computer network protocol

Minimal Lower Layer Protocol (MLLP) is a network protocol typically used with HL7 data.

In most cases, when HL7 2.x data is transmitted over the network it is done using MLLP.

== Characteristics ==
It transmits data encapsulated in TCP and has no assigned default port number. Typically, port 6660 is used.

A large portion of HL7 messaging is transported by Minimal Lower Layer Protocol (MLLP), also known as Lower Layer Protocol (LLP) or Minimum Layer Protocol (MLP). For transmitting via TCP/IP, header and trailer characters are added to the message to identify the beginning and ending of the message because TCP/IP is a continuous stream of bytes. Hybrid Lower Layer Protocol (HLLP) is a variation of MLLP that includes a checksum to help verify message integrity. Amongst other software vendors, MLLP is supported by Microsoft, Oracle, Cleo.

== Security ==
MLLP contains no inherent security or encryption but relies on lower layer protocols such as Transport Layer Security (TLS) or IPsec for safeguarding Protected health information outside of a secure network.

== Variants ==
The HL7 Implementation Support Guide also specifies a variant based on ANSI X3.29 to be used over RS-232, because the latter tends to suffer from flow control and error recovery issues.
