= AS3 =

AS3 or AS-3 may refer to:

- ActionScript 3.0, ECMAScript
- AS3 (networking), Applicability Statement 3, a specification standard by which applications communicate for Electronic Data Interchange
- AS-3 Kangaroo, NATO reporting name for Russian Raduga Kh-20 cruise missile.
- RuPaul's Drag Race All Stars 3, the third season of television series RuPaul's Drag Race: All Stars.
- Smith & Wesson AS, a 12 gauge select fire shotgun.
- As^{3−}, the arsenide anion in chemistry
