= Value-added network =

Electronic facility for business processes

A value-added network (VAN) is a hosted service offering that acts as an intermediary between business partners sharing standards based on proprietary data via shared business processes. The offered service is referred to as "value-added network services".

== 1960s: "Timesharing" and "network" service ==
Following in the wake of timesharing providers, provision of leased lines between terminals and data centers proved a sustainable business which led to the establishment of dedicated business units and companies specialized in the management and marketing of such network services. See Tymshare for an example of a timeshare services company that spun off Tymnet as a data communications specialist with a complex product portfolio.

== 1970s: Marketisation of telecommunication ==
The large-scale allocation of network services by private companies was in conflict with state-controlled telecommunications sector. To be able to gain a license for telecommunication service provision to customers, a private business had to "add value" to the communications line in order to be a distinguishable service. Therefore, the notion of "value-added network services" was established to allow for operation of such private businesses as an exemption from state control.

The telecommunication operator sector was marketed in the USA in 1982 (see Modification of Final Judgment) and in the United Kingdom starting with the early 1980s (mainly due to the privatization of British Telecom under Prime Minister Margaret Thatcher). In the later 1980s, running a value-added network service required licensing in the U.K. while the term "value-added network" had merely become a functional description of a specific subset of networked data communication in the USA.

== Since 1980s: International competition and standardization efforts ==
On a multinational scale, and due to the heterogeneous telecommunication economy and infrastructure before the market penetration of the Internet, management of a value-added network service proved a complicated task leading to the idea of user-defined networks, a concept preceding the nowadays ubiquitous availability of internet service. Standardization efforts for data networking were made by ITU-T (formerly CCIT) and included X.25 packet-switched networks and X.400 message handling systems, specifically motivated by an emerging transatlantic competition in the early 1990s.

== Perspective ==
In the absence of state-operated telecommunication sector, value-added network services are still used, mainly as a functional description, in conjunction with dedicated leased lines for business-to-business communications (especially for EDIFACT data transfer).

Governments like South Africa still maintain explicit regulation, while others address specific services with licensing.

Traditionally, most value-added network services mainly supported general-purpose business-to-business integration capabilities focused on electronic data interchanges, but service providers are evolving to become more process- and industry-specific over time, particularly in industries such as retail and hi-tech manufacturing. Some sources suggest that modern value-added network services should be called "trading grids" due to commonalities with grid computing. Others distinguish internet service providers from international value-added network services (IVANS) operators.

== See also ==
- Electronic Data Interchange#Value-added networks
