= Accounts payable =

Money owed by business to its suppliers

Accounts payable (AP) is money owed by a business to its suppliers, shown as a liability on a company's balance sheet. It is distinct from notes payable liabilities, which are debts created by formal legal instrument documents. An accounts payable department's main responsibility is to process and review transactions between the company and its suppliers and to make sure that all outstanding invoices from their suppliers are approved, processed, and paid. The accounts payable process starts with collecting supply requirements from within the organization and seeking quotes from vendors for the items required. Once the deal is negotiated, purchase orders are prepared and sent. The goods delivered are inspected upon arrival and the invoice received is routed for approvals. Processing an invoice includes recording important data from the invoice and inputting it into the company's financial, or bookkeeping, system. After this is accomplished, the invoices must go through the company's respective business process in order to be paid.

== Overview ==
An accounts payable department is typically located within an organisation's finance function.

An account payable is recorded in the Account Payable sub-ledger at the time an invoice is vouched for payment. Vouchered, or vouched, means that an invoice is approved for payment and has been recorded in the General Ledger or AP subledger as an outstanding, or open, liability because it has not been paid. Payables are often categorized as Trade Payables, payables for the purchase of physical goods that are recorded in Inventory, and Expense Payables, payables for the purchase of goods or services that are expensed. Common examples of Expense Payables are advertising, travel, entertainment, office supplies and utilities. AP is a form of credit that suppliers offer to their customers by allowing them to pay for a product or service after it has already been received. Suppliers offer various payment terms for an invoice. Payment terms may include the offer of a cash discount for paying an invoice within a defined number of days. For example, 2%, Net 30 terms mean that the payer will deduct 2% from the invoice if payment is made within 30 days. If the payment is made on Day 31 then the full amount is paid.

In a business, there is usually a much broader range of services in the AP file, and accountants or bookkeepers usually use accounting software to track the flow of money into this liability account when they receive invoices and out of it when they make payments. Increasingly, large firms are using specialized Accounts Payable automation solutions to automate the paper and manual elements of processing an organization's invoices.

Commonly, a supplier will ship a product, issue an invoice, and collect payment later. This is a cash conversion cycle, or a period of time during which the supplier has already paid for raw materials but has not been paid in return by the final customer.

When the invoice is received by the purchaser, it is matched to the packing slip and purchase order, and if all is in order, the invoice is paid. This is referred to as the three-way match. The three-way match can slow down the payment process, so the method may be modified. For example, three-way matching may be limited solely to large-value invoices, or the matching is automatically approved if the received quantity is within a certain percentage of the amount authorized in the purchase order. Invoice processing automation software handles the matching process differently depending upon the business rules put in place during the creation of the workflow process. The simplest case is the two way matching between the invoice itself and the purchase order.

Estimates from 2009 suggested that more than a billion business-to-business invoices were being processed each week, and 97% of these were still processed manually. The average cost to process and pay a supplier invoice was between $5 and $15, with 10% processed too late to be paid within discounting terms, and nearly 2% containing errors.

In households, accounts payable are ordinarily bills from suppliers such as an electric company, telephone company, cable television or satellite dish service, newspaper subscription, and other such regular services. Householders can track and pay on a monthly basis by hand using cheques, credit cards or internet banking.

== Internal controls ==
A variety of checks against abuse are usually present to prevent embezzlement by accounts payable personnel. Separation of duties is a common control. In countries where cheques payment are common nearly all companies have a junior employee process and print a cheque and a senior employee review and sign the cheque. Often, the accounting software will limit each employee to performing only the functions assigned to them, so that there is no way any one employee – even the controller – can singlehandedly make a payment.

Some companies also separate the functions of adding new vendors to the master vendor file and entering vouchers. This makes it impossible for an employee to add themselves as a vendor and then write a cheque to themselves without colluding with another employee. The master vendor file is the repository of all significant information about the company's suppliers. It is the reference point for accounts payable when it comes to paying invoices.

In addition, most companies require a second signature on cheques whose amount exceeds a specified threshold.

Accounts payable personnel must watch for fraudulent invoices. In the absence of a purchase order system, the first line of defense is the approving manager. However, AP staff should become familiar with a few common problems, such as "Yellow Pages" ripoffs in which fraudulent operators offer to place an advertisement. The walking-fingers logo has never been trademarked, and there are many different Yellow Pages-style directories, most of which have a small distribution. According to an article in the Winter 2000 American Payroll Association's Employer Practices, "Vendors may send documents that look like invoices but in small print they state "this is not a bill". These may be charges for directory listings or advertisements. Recently, some companies have begun sending what appears to be a rebate or refund check; in reality, it is a registration for services that is activated when the document is returned with a signature."

In accounts payable, a simple mistake can cause a large overpayment. A common example involves duplicate invoices. An invoice may be temporarily misplaced or still in the approval status when the vendors calls to inquire into its payment status. After the AP staff member looks it up and finds it has not been paid, the vendor sends a duplicate invoice; meanwhile the original invoice shows up and gets paid. Then the duplicate invoice arrives and inadvertently gets paid as well, perhaps under a slightly different invoice.

== Audits of accounts payable ==
Auditors often focus on the existence of approved invoices, expense reports, and other supporting documentation to support checks that were cut. The presence of a confirmation or statement from the supplier is reasonable proof of the existence of the account. It is not uncommon for some of this documentation to be lost or misfiled by the time the audit rolls around. An auditor may decide to expand the sample size in such situations.

Auditors typically prepare an aging structure of accounts payable for a better understanding of outstanding debts over certain periods (30, 60, 90 days, etc.). Such structures are helpful in the correct presentation of the balance sheet as of fiscal year end.

== Automation ==
Many companies are involved in work to streamline or automate the business process of their accounts payable departments. This process is straightforward but can become very cumbersome, especially if the company has a very large number of invoices. This problem is compounded when invoices that require processing are on paper. This can lead to lost invoices, human error during data entry, and invoice duplicates. These and other problems lead to a high cost per invoice metric. The goal of automating the accounts payable department is to streamline this invoicing process, eliminate potential human error, and lower the cost per invoice.

Some of the most common AP automation solutions include e-invoicing, scanning of documents, optical character recognition, automation of workflow rules, online tracking, reporting capabilities, electronic invoice user interfaces, supplier networks, payment services and spend analytics for all invoices. Effective automation functions include freeform recognition (ability to interpret invoice documents regardless of layout or the need to create a supplier template) and automatic learning capabilities.

Electronic invoicing can be a very useful tool for the AP department. Electronic invoicing allows vendors to submit invoices over the internet and have those invoices automatically routed and processed. Because invoice arrival and presentation is almost immediate invoices are paid sooner; therefore, the amount of time and money it takes to process these invoices is greatly reduced. (Financial Operations Networks, 2008) These solutions usually involve a third-party company that provides and supports an application which allows a supplier to submit an electronic invoice to their customer for immediate routing, approval, and payment. These applications are tied to databases which archive transaction information between trading partners. (US Bank, Scott Hesse, 2010) The invoices may be submitted in a number of ways, including EDI, CSV, or XML uploads, PDF files, or online invoice templates. Because e-invoicing includes so many different technologies and entry options, it is an umbrella category for any method by which an invoice is electronically presented to a customer for payment.

Enterprise resource planning systems typically use software to provide integrated business process management services to enterprises.

=== History ===
Since the mid-1960s companies have established data links between their trading partners to transfer documents, such as invoices and purchase orders. Inspired by the idea of a paperless office and more reliable transfer of data, they developed the first EDI systems. These systems were unique to the respective company that developed them, meaning they were difficult to deploy across a large number of corporations. Recognizing this, the Accredited Standards Committee X12—a standards institution under the umbrella of ANSI—made preparations to standardize EDI processes. This resulted in what is known today as the ANSI X12 EDI standard.

This remained the main way to exchange transactional data between trading partners for nearly 3 decades. The 1990s came with advances in internet technology. Companies began to appear offering more robust user interface web applications with functions that catered to both supplier and customer. These new web-based applications allowed for online submission of individual invoices as well as EDI file uploads. Along with other methods of file uploads including CSV and XML. These services allow suppliers to present invoices to their customers for matching and approval via a user-friendly web application. Suppliers can also see a history of all the invoices they submitted to their customer without having direct access to the customers' systems. This is because all the transactional information is stored in the data centers of the third-party company that provides the invoicing web app. This proprietary information can be regulated by the customer in order to control how much transactional information the vendor is allowed to see (for example, payment dates or check information).

As companies advance into the digital era, more and more are switching to electronic invoicing services to automate their accounts payable departments to reduce errors and save costs. According to a benchmark study conducted by the IOMA, 19% of organisations surveyed reported a duplicate payment rate of between 0.1% and 0.5%. Some even believe it to be an industry standard in the near future. According to a report done by the GXS team in 2013, Europe is adopting government legislation encouraging businesses to adopt electronic invoicing practices. The United States has no such legislation yet but does recognize the value of this technology. The US Treasury estimated that implementing e-invoicing across the entire federal government would reduce cost by 50% and save $450 million annually.

With the increasing availability of robotic solutions, businesses are driving process improvement in AP even further. By applying end-to-end robotic process automation or RPA to their accounts payable department, organizations can accelerate invoice processing speed and accuracy while improving operational costs. Some organizations report that by implementing RPA they have managed to almost eliminate human intervention from the AP process, thus saving 65% to 75% of the time that was previously spent on manual processing.

== See also ==
- List of accounting topics
- Accounts receivable
- Payroll
- Invoice reader
- Creditor Reference
