= X12 EDIFACT Mapping =

In 1979, the American National Standards Institute (ANSI) chartered the Accredited Standards Committee (ASC) X12 to develop uniform standards for interindustry electronic exchange of business transactions-electronic data interchange (EDI)

In 1986, the United Nations Economic Commission for Europe (UN/ECE) approved the acronym "UN/EDIFACT" which translates to United Nations Electronic Data Interchange for Administration, Commerce and Transport. UN/EDIFACT is an international EDI standard designed to meet the needs of both government and private industry.

The UN/EDIFACT Working Group (EWG), a permanent working group of the United Nations Centre for Trade Facilitation and Electronic Business (UN/CEFACT), develops and maintains UN/EDIFACT

X12 is used in the USA and by U.S. organizations worldwide. Much of the rest of the world uses the EDIFACT messages.

== Mapping ==
TRANSACTION SET/MESSAGE	X12	EDIFACT
PRODUCT/PRICING TRANSACTIONS
Price Sales Catalog	832	PRICAT
Price Authorization Acknowledgement/Status	845	ATHSTS
Specification/Technical Information	841	PRDSPE
Request For Quotation	840	REQOTE
Response To Request For Quotation	843	QUOTES
Electronic Bid Form	833	—
ORDERING TRANSACTIONS
Purchase Order	850	ORDERS
Purchase Order Acknowledgement	855	ORDRSP
Purchase Order Change	860	ORDCHG
Purchase Order Change Acknowledgement	865	ORDRSP
Order Status Inquiry	869	ORSSTA
Order Status Report	870	ORDREP
Contract Award	836	—
Product Activity Data	852	SLSRPT
MATERIALS MANAGEMENT TRANSACTIONS
Planning Schedule/Material Release	830	DELFOR
Shipping Schedule	862	DELJIT
Production Sequence	866	—
Ship Notice/manifest (ASN)	856	DESADV
Report of Test Results	863	QUALITY
Material Safety Data Sheet	848	—
Contract Award	836	—
SHIPPING/RECEIVING TRANSACTIONS
Shipment Information (Bill of Lading)	858	IFTMCS
Receiving Advice	861	RECADV
Non-conformance Information-Disposition Transaction, Cause/Correction	842	—
INVENTORY MANAGEMENT TRANSACTIONS
Inventory Inquiry/Advice	846	INVRPT
Product Transfer and Resale Report	867	—
Product Transfer Account Adjustment	844	SSDCLM
Response To Product Transfer Account Adjustment	849	—
FINANCIAL TRANSACTIONS
Invoice	810	INVOIC
Freight Invoice	859	IFTMCS
Payment order/Remittance Advice (EFT)	820	REMADV
Lockbox	823	—
Financial Information Reporting	821	—
HEALTHCARE TRANSACTIONS
Eligibility Inquiry	270	—
Eligibility Inquiry Response	271	—
Claim Status Inquiry	276	—
Claim Status Response	277	—
Service Review Request	278-13	—
Service Review Response	278-11	—
Premium Payment and Deduction	820	—
Benefit Enrollment and Maintenance	834	—
Claim Remittance Advice	835	—
Claim (Professional, Institutional, Dentist)	837	—
CONTROL TRANSACTIONS
Functional Acknowledgement	997	CONTRL
Application Advice	824	APERAK
Trading Partner Profile	838	PARTIN

== See also ==
- Electronic Data Interchange
- EDIFACT
- ASC X12
