= HL7 Services Aware Interoperability Framework =

This article documents the effort of the Health Level Seven(HL7) community and specifically the former HL7 Architecture Board (ArB) to develop an interoperability framework that would support services, messages, and Clinical Document Architecture(CDA) ISO 10871.

HL7 provides a framework and standards for the exchange, integration, sharing, and retrieval of electronic health information.

== SAIF Overview ==
The HL7 Services-Aware Interoperability Framework Canonical Definition (SAIF-CD) provides consistency between all artifacts, and enables a standardized approach to enterprise architecture (EA) development and implementation, and a way to measure the consistency.

SAIF is a way of thinking about producing specifications that explicitly describe the governance, conformance, compliance, and behavioral semantics that are needed to achieve computable semantic working interoperability. The intended information transmission technology might use a messaging, document exchange, or services approach.

SAIF is the framework that is required to rationalize interoperability of standards. SAIF is an architecture for achieving interoperability, but it is not a whole-solution design for enterprise architecture management.

The informative document may be found at Public SAIF CD. Since the release of this document, the SAIF-CD has been balloted as a Draft Standard for Trial Use. The document will be made available by the end of May, 2012.

A Short introduction to SAIF was made to provide insight to users of the SAIF-CD.

== Document Divisions ==
The SAIF-CD consists of the following sections:

- Introduction
- Governance Framework (GF)
- Behavioral Framework (BF)
- Information Framework(IF)
- Enterprise Consistency and Conformity Framework (ECCF)
- Interoperability Specification Matrix (ISM)
- Compliant SAIF Implementation Guides
- Appendix

=== Introduction ===
The SAIF Introduction and Overview describes the general constructs that frame the SAIF. SAIF represents a synthesis of best practices and concepts from multiple architectural frameworks. This introduction to SAIF goes into significant technical depth and assumes familiarity with architectural standards and the HL7 organization.

=== Governance Framework ===
The Governance Framework (GF) describes the motivation for, the structure, content and utilization of the GF. The ECCF and BF are discussed in detail in separate documents, and are mentioned in the course of this document only when necessary to either contextualize or logically link GF content to the larger context of the Services Aware Interoperability Framework.

=== Behavioral Framework ===
The Behavioral Framework (BF) provides a set of constructs for defining the behavioral semantics of specifications, which enable working interoperability. As a result, the focus of the BF is accountability – a description of “who does what when.” Accountability describes the perspective of the various technology components that are involved in a particular instance or scenario designed to achieve Working Interoperability. The BF is technology-neutral and, therefore, can be used within model-driven specification stacks.

=== Information Framework ===
The Information Framework (IF) is a SAIF-compliant recasting of existing HL7 expertise regarding the specification of static semantics. The Information Framework will draw on the information available from the following sources:

- Storyboards
- Domain Analysis Models (DAM)
- Reference Information Model (RIM) ISO21731
- Vocabulary concepts
- HL7 Core Principles

=== Enterprise Consistency and Conformity Framework ===
The major goal of the Enterprise Consistency and Conformity Framework (ECCF) is enabling working interoperability between different users, organizations, and systems. The ECCF is manifest in a structure called the ECCF specification stack (SS). This structure identifies, defines, organizes, and relates a set of artifacts that collectively specify the relevant semantics of a software component specification or other system-of- interest. In summary, the ECCF SS provides an organizational framework in which inter-related artifacts are sorted by content – for example a Unified Modeling Language (UML) activity diagram in the Business viewpoint that contains static data constructs (for example, documents or data structures) which passes between the various structures would all have the relevant static constructs detailed in artifacts, specifically, business rules, information constructors, behavioral contracts, and level-of-abstraction.

=== Interoperability Specification Matrix (ISM) ===
The Interoperability Specification Matrix (ISM) defines a 5-column-by-3-row matrix (“table”) which distributes the multiple aspects of a given component's specification across the various cells of the matrix. The structure of the ISM is based on proven cognitive models for describing complex systems which revolve around the notion of partitioning complexity based on a number of Dimensions while simultaneously viewing each of these dimensions from multiple Perspectives.

=== Compliant SAIF Implementation Guides ===
This section defines the creation of a compliant implementation guide.
