= Shipdex =

Shipdex is a collection of international business rules developed to standardize and improve the production and the exchange of technical information between equipment makers, shipyards and ship-owners according to international S1000D specifications already in use for about 30 years in the military sector (naval, land and aerospace) and adopted more recently by Civil aviation. It enables equipment manufacturers and shipyards to structure, write and deliver technical manuals, and to load ERP (Enterprise Resource Planning) and CMM (Computerized Maintenance Management) systems with technical manual contents into a standardized electronic format, making them much easier to produce and manage, compared to traditional methods of writing technical manuals using a word processor.

Shipdex Protocol covers technical data exchange in any maritime project, and is open to any company or organization which wishes to use it by registering at www.shipdex.org.

== Organization ==
The Shipdex Protocol was developed by the following (founding member) companies: Grimaldi Compagnia di Navigazione S.P.A., Intership Navigation Co., Ltd., Mastermind Shipmanagement Ltd., Alfa Laval, MacGregor, (a part of Cargotec Group), MAN Diesel & Turbo, SpecTec Group Ltd., and Yanmar Co. Ltd., but was registered as a trademark for copyright purposes under the name of Grimaldi Compagnia di Navigazione S.P.A. and Internship Navigation Ltd.

Currently the Shipdex organization is composed of the following Executive Members: MAN ES, Mastermind Shipmanagement (chairman), Rolls-Royce Maritime, Shipdex Consulting (technical manager), Yanmar, G&C Shipping, Winterthur Gas & Diesel.

The Shipdex Protocol is developed, maintained, and promoted by the Shipdex Co. Ltd (CY), a nonprofit organization whose purpose is to standardize the electronic exchange of technical data in the shipping industry. The Shipdex Protocol is maintained by the Shipdex Protocol Maintenance Group (SPMG) which obtains agreements from the Executive Members prior to application changes. The SPMG considers change proposals issued by Shipdex Registered Members at each meeting and may ratify them for incorporation in the Protocol. Any queries or proposals relating to changes to the Protocol are addressed to the Technical Manager of the SPMG using the online "Change Proposal Form" (CPF) at www.shipdex.com.

== System architecture ==
The Shipdex Protocol specification criteria were designed to provide the end user with essential, complete, and non-redundant technical information which is linked to logistic studies (if any), equivalent analysis, and related maintenance strategies. Document contents are gathered in an organic way into "Data Modules" (DMs) defined as "the smallest self contained information unit within a Shipdeck data set". The structure of these modules vary, depending on the type of data dealt with. Every DM corresponds to a specific, uniquely identified electronic file produced in the XML language, which allows the user to structure and identify each individual piece of information contained into the DM itself. Every DM contains data which can refer to other DMs, to "information objects" (illustrations, symbols, multimedia objects) or external documents (in PDF or Microsoft Office formats).

Specifically, the DMs contain the following types of information:

- Identification and status, containing all identification and quality assurance information
- Content, which varies, depending on the following Data Module types:
- Descriptive
- Procedural
- Illustrated parts data (IPD)
- Maintenance Planning
- Service Bulletin
- Learning

The Data Module types that the Shipdex Protocol makes use of are: Descriptive, Procedural, IPD and schedule. These DM types are governed by the relevant S1000D XML schemas version 2.3 (available for free download from www.s1000d.org) .

All Data Modules that are applicable to the "product" (a civil or military sea vehicle, equipment or facility) may be gathered and managed in a database, called the Common Source Data Base (CSDB). Information is not duplicated in the CSDB, although individual DMs can be used many times in the output. Savings are made in the maintenance of the data because it only needs to be changed once, and the updated information appears throughout the output.
