= Invoice processing =

Handling of incoming invoices

UML class diagram depecting a invoice

Invoice processing : involves the handling of incoming invoices from arrival to payment. Invoices have many variations and types. In general, invoices are grouped into two types:

1. Invoices associated with a company's internal request or purchase order (PO-based invoices) and
2. Invoices that do not have an associated request (non-PO invoices).

Most organizations have clear instructions regarding the way that they should process incoming invoices. It is common to have one approach for PO-based invoices, and another for non-PO invoices. Some companies also have unique requirements based on the type or dollar amount of a transaction.

In general, both types of invoices are processed by a company's accounts payable department. The process in which a supplier invoice is validated and paid is also known as the purchase-to-pay cycle.

== Typical process or manual invoice processing ==
The process usually begins when a supplier's invoice is received. Invoices can be sent via email, postal mail, fax, or EDI.

Once an invoice arrives, the accounts payable clerk must ensure that the document is indeed an invoice. Then the clerk classifies and sorts the invoice into various categories (e.g., by vendor, by transaction type, or by department). The definition of invoice categories is usually unique to a specific organization.

Once the invoice is classified, it is forwarded to the AP processor who is responsible for the particular invoice. This is normally the person who has placed that order. If there was a purchase order created during procurement, the invoice must then be matched against the purchase order to confirm that the amount that is being paid is correctly stated on the invoice. (This helps protect against fraud and unauthorized transactions.)

If the amount is right and the goods have arrived, the responsible person will have to approve the invoice by signing off on it. If the amount invoiced exceeds a certain amount that is limited by the organization, the superior of that person may have to approve the invoice as well. This, of course, also differs from organization to organization.

Once the invoice has been approved and there have been no variances, the invoice is posted into the accounting system. From there, a voucher can be created and the payment can be issued.

A manual invoice process can sometimes exceed fifteen steps before the final posting is done.

== Automatic invoice processing ==
Technology has long enabled the automation of invoice processing from arrival to post. This means that at arrival of the invoice, the same accounts payable clerk will only need to scan the invoice into an automation software. The automation software then converts the invoice's scanned image into a text-researchable document. The different fields on an invoice can also be defined into the software so that it remembers which fields it should capture and register into the ERP systems, for instance, the purchase amount, the quantity, the supplier name, the supplier code, and so on. The benefits of an automatic processing workflow may include reduced human error, on-demand reports, and data resilience. Most automation software today integrates into common organizational ERP systems such as SAP, Microsoft, and Oracle. Examples of such automation platforms include AI-based solutions like InvoiceAction, which help streamline invoice capture, validation, and ERP integration for accountants and controllers.

In an automatic process, once the data is extracted or captured from the invoice the data is sent into the system for automatic matching against the purchase order. This matching process can compare just the invoice data with that shown on the purchase order or be expanded to include a deeper level that looks at the receiving documents. Workflow steps can be configured such that the responsible person will then receive an email alert so that he or she can approve the invoice. If there are other people involved in the approval workflow, email alerts to them will also be automatically generated. The typical workflow is a four-step process beginning with 1. Import of the images through scanning or email, 2. Identification of the vendor and business unit associated with the invoice, 3. Data extraction, and 4. Export of the extracted data and images.

== Automation software ==
Accounts payable automation is a technology-driven approach to invoice processing. According to the Document Imaging Report, issue no. 8-17-07, there are around 3757 invoice processing applications in the world.

Intelligent Data Capture (IDC) or learning systems enable end users to extract content from invoices without the system having to learn the layout of the invoice. Some intelligent engines are able to correctly sort batches on the fly, locate data fields such as invoice and PO number, as well as line item information, and then extract the desired content from those data fields. Intelligent solutions do not require the coding of rules or design form templates. Rather the system learns by reviewing a relatively small number of invoice samples. This helps the system scale to large invoice volumes and widely varying document layouts without requiring a human operator to specify a template for each one, or explicitly create and tune an extensive library of keywords.

Invoice processing automation software has emerged as what one consulting company has called a "disruptive innovation," whereby this new technological innovation has created a demand for a whole line of software products that previously did not exist. Invoice processing software has produced tremendous labor savings to the extent that many companies have begun to consider it an essential piece of their technology, much like word processing software.

Other advantages of accounts payable automation include:

- Up to an 80 percent reduction in a company's procure to pay cycle
- A reduction in duplicate invoice payments and invoice entry errors
- The ability to assign GL codes to invoices without direct access to a company's accounting platform.

== Comprehensive invoice process management ==
The typical approach towards invoice management processes start from the arrival of a supplier invoice. Depending on the process design, the invoice should be identified, categorized, filed and matched against a PO by the person who was responsible for the order. After these steps the invoice is usually transferred to the financial department and the sum is paid. The problem with this process is the lack of comprehensive cost management, which should involve the following checkpoints and controlling points:

- Was the person who ordered item eligible to place the order?
- Was the PO approved by a responsible person?
- Can the PO or invoice be linked to an existing supplier contract?

Comprehensive invoice management processes, therefore, shall involve the above-mentioned checkpoints in order to ensure that no fake suppliers can issue an invoice and get paid. This has happened to tech giants, hence the danger is real and shall not be overlooked.
