= AS3 (networking) =

Network protocol for business-to-business data

AS3 (Applicability Statement 3), RFC 4823, is a standard by which vendor applications communicate structured business-to-business data over the Internet using File Transfer Protocol (FTP). It is an EDI protocol.

While AS2 is a transfer protocol, AS3 is a message standard that focuses on message formatting. Where AS2 requires dedicated AS2 server and client to send messages, AS3 is flexible; once an AS3 message is composed, it can be transmitted via any other protocol – FTP, SFTP, HTTPS, and more – as long as both the sender and recipient can access the message's location. Also unlike AS2, AS3 is a push-pull protocol and does not require an ongoing connection.

== See also ==
- AS1
- AS2
- AS4
