= ASC X12 =

Organization

Accredited Standards Committee X12
- Abbreviation: ASC X12
- Predecessor: Transportation Data Coordinating Committee
- Formation: 1979
- Purpose: Business-to-business electronic data interchange standards
- Headquarters: McLean, Virginia
- Official language: English
- Chair: Gary Beatty
- Vice Chair: LuAnn Hetherington
- Website: x12.org

The Accredited Standards Committee (ASC) X12 is a standards organization. Chartered by the American National Standards Institute (ANSI) in 1979, it develops and maintains the X12 Electronic data interchange (EDI) and Context Inspired Component Architecture (CICA) standards along with XML schemas which drive business processes globally. The membership of ASC X12 includes technologists and business process experts, encompassing health care, insurance, transportation, finance, government, supply chain and other industries.

ASC X12 has sponsored more than 300 X12 EDI transaction sets and a growing collection of X12 XML schemas for health care, insurance, government, transportation, finance, and many other industries. ASC X12's membership includes 3,000 standards experts representing over 600 companies from multiple business domains.

== Organization ==
ASC X12 is led by two groups. The ASC X12 Board of Directors (Board) and the ASC X12 Steering Committee (Steering) collaborate to ensure the best interests of ASC X12 are served. Each group has specific responsibilities and the groups cooperatively handle items or issues that span the responsibilities of both groups.

=== Subcommittees ===
ASC X12 is organized into subcommittees that develop and maintain standards for a particular set of business functions.

X12C Communications & Controls
Responsible for EDI control structures, security, and architecture as well as the X12 XML Reference Model.
X12F Finance
X12F is responsible for the development and maintenance of components of the ASC X12 Standards related to the financial services industry's business activities. ASC X12F also develops and maintains interpretations, technical reports and guidelines related to its areas of responsibility.
X12I Transportation
X12I is responsible for the development and maintenance of components of the ASC X12 Standards related to the transportation industry's business activities, including air, marine, rail, and motor freight transportation and Customs, logistics and multi-modal activities. ASC X12I also develops and maintains interpretations, technical reports and guidelines related to its areas of responsibility.
X12J Technical Assessment
Maintains the directory, dictionary and design rules for all the X12 standards. Also manages the process for requests for standards changes.
X12M Supply Chain
X12M is responsible for the development and maintenance of components of the ASC X12 Standards related to the supply chain industry's business activities, excluding transportation and finance, from sourcing to delivery. Supply Chain activities include Distribution Management, Inventory Management, Marketing Data Management, Materials Management, Procurement Management, Product Management, Production Planning Management, Sales,
X12N Insurance
X12N is responsible for the development and maintenance of components of the ASC X12 Standards related to the insurance industry's business activities, including those related to property insurance, casualty insurance, health care insurance, life insurance, annuity insurance, reinsurance, and pensions. Health insurance activities include those undertaken by commercial and government health care organizations

=== Caucuses ===
There are informal industry groups created to identify issues and activities in specific areas. In 2014, there were four caucuses.

Clearinghouse
Created in October 2012 to support and improve EDI peer-to-peer connectivity, with a focus on health information exchanges.
Connectivity
Created in January 2010 to support and improve EDI peer-to-peer connectivity, with a focus on value-added networks and clearinghouses.
Dental
Focuses on X12 healthcare standards in relation to dentistry and the dental industry.
Provider
Focuses on interests and concerns of healthcare providers regarding X12 healthcare standards.

== See also ==
- Electronic Data Interchange
- EDIFACT
- X12 EDIFACT Mapping
- List of X12 EDI transaction sets
