= Lucy Wilson =

Lucy Wilson may refer to:

- Lucy Sarah Atkins Wilson (1801–1863), British author and editor, specialising in children's scientific literature
- Lucy Langdon Wilson (1864–1937), American educator and ethnographer
- Lucy Wilson (suffragist) (1834–1891), Yorkshire-born suffragist, educationalist and campaigner for the rights of women
- Lucy Wilson (physicist) (1888–1980), American physicist
- Lucy Wilson Rice (1874–1963), American artist
