= Daniel Wolfe =

American activist, advocate, and writer

- Born: 1960 (age 65–66)
- Occupations: Activist, advocate, writer, health policy expert
- Known for: HIV/AIDS activism, harm reduction, community health, AI in health

Daniel Wolfe (born 1960) is an American activist, advocate, and writer whose work advances health programs and policy that balance scientific research and community expertise. His career has focused on support for community health movements, particularly among groups often regarded as criminal or socially suspect, including gay men and people who use illicit drugs.

== Early life ==
Wolfe was raised between Arizona—including time on Rancho Linda Vista, a commune outside of Tucson—and East Hampton, NY. He received his undergraduate degree in Near Eastern Studies from Princeton University, and following time studying Arabic in Egypt, worked as the junior ghostwriter on the autobiographies of First Lady of Egypt Jehan Sadat and Pakistani Prime Minister Benazir Bhutto. Upon return to New York, he was an assistant at the Council on Foreign Relations to Richard W. Murphy, former US Assistant Secretary of State for Near Eastern and South Asian Affairs. Disagreement with US killing of Iraqi civilians during the 1990 Gulf War—and the rising toll of HIV in NY—moved Wolfe to leave Middle East studies and work full-time on AIDS in 1990.

== Education ==
Wolfe was Community Scholar at the Columbia University Mailman School of Public Healthwhere he received his Masters in Public Health in 2004. He holds a Masters of Philosophy (in history) from Columbia University, and a BA in Near Eastern Studies from Princeton University. He was the recipient of a Charles H. Revson Foundation fellowship for urban leaders who have made a substantial contribution to New York City, and a fellow at the Center for Arabic Studies Abroad in Cairo, Egypt.

== AIDS and gay activism ==
Wolfe was part of the media committee for ACT UP’s 1998 action to seize control of the FDA, and helped organize ACT UP NY’s challenge to Governor Cuomo to do better on the AIDS response and other actions.Wolfe also joined ACT UP colleagues Gregg Bordowitz, David Barr, Richard Elovich, Jean Carlomusto and others to work at Gay Men’s Health Crisis (GMHC), the nation’s first AIDS organization, where he served as director of communications and spokesperson on issues including opposition to NY State cuts to the AIDS budget, the disclosure that Olympic Champion Greg Louganis had HIV, reports of the FBI spying on AIDS activists, and GMHC’s move to offer HIV testing and targeted support to those who were HIV-negative.

Wolfe also continued cultural work, making art, performance and video as a member of the gay and lesbian collective GANG with artists and ACT UP members including Zoe Leonard, Suzanne Wright, Loring McAlpin, Wellington Love, Adam Rolston and others, and writing a biography of Lawrence of Arabia for a series for young adults on famous gay men and lesbians in history edited by Martin Duberman. Controversy followed, with North Carolina Senator Jesse Helms waving a GANG piece in an issue of the Movement Research Performance Journal on the floor of Congress to show the "rottenness" of publicly funded art, and a number of schools banning the biography series for young adults from their libraries. Wolfe and others challenged the move as continuing the longstanding and homophobic demand that notable gay men and lesbians stay silent about essential details of their private lives even while being celebrated for their professional achievements.

== Gay health ==
The approval of antiretroviral therapy for HIV in 1996 opened up new space for discussions of gay health beyond HIV, and new directions for Wolfe. Working from hundreds of interviews, surveys, workshops, and with a team of writers, Wolfe was the author of Men Like Us, the Our Bodies, Ourselves-inspired GMHC Complete Guide to Gay Men’s Sexual, Physical, and Emotional Well-being, covering issues from spirituality to sexual health to aging. The move to frame gay health beyond condoms and pills—and to offer a guide to health that “did not need to be translated from the original heterosexual”—was part of a larger gay health movement encompassing wellness and pleasure, and focused less on health disparity than on individual and community resilience. Wolfe was a keynote speaker and workshop leader, along with Eric Rofes, Chris Bartlett, and other organizers, at the first National Gay Men’s Health Summit held in Boulder, Colorado in 2002. Awarded a Charles H. Revson Fellowship for urban leaders in the City of New York, Wolfe became a community scholar at Columbia University’s Center of History and Ethics of Public Health, where he received his MPH in 2003, and was a contributor to Searching Eyes: Privacy, the State, and Disease Surveillance in America.

== International harm reduction ==
Wolfe was Director of International Harm Reduction Development at the Open Society Foundations (2005-2021) where he led grantmaking and advocacy to protect the health and rights of people who use drugs in Eastern Europe, Asia, Africa and the Americas. Wolfe challenged approaches that conditioned support on abstinence or that sought to treat people who use illegal drugs like drugs themselves, as something to be controlled or contained. As with the gay health movement, he advocated a focus on community resilience and strengths, and on supporting individuals and communities to negotiate the balance between risk and pleasure of activities integral to life.

Noting what he called the “antisocial behavior of health systems,” Wolfe’s analysis elevated issues such as forced labor and harsh punishment delivered in the name of addiction treatment and rehabilitation, the role of criminalization, imprisonment and stigma in interrupting or impeding HIV treatment, and the bias toward coercive approaches in studying and delivering addiction treatments. He also pointed to defects in national and international drug control policies and human rights violations as a root cause of HIV, hepatitis, and other health challenges faced by people who used drugs. Concrete advocacy supported by Open Society’s International Harm Reduction Development program under his direction included rebuffing US government efforts to force the UN to remove all references to harm reduction in its materials, addition of the addiction treatment medicines methadone and buprenorphine to the World Health Organization’s essential medicines list, and WHO endorsement of lay distribution of the opioid overdose antidote naloxone. Wolfe and OSF colleagues also advocated for new approaches to intellectual property and data sharing in research and development of medicines and vaccines to lower price and improve access to medicines globally to those in need.

== AI and patient rights ==
Reports of patients denied opioid prescriptions based on an algorithm purporting to calculate their risk of overdose led Wolfe to work on AI, first as a resident at the Rockefeller Foundation Bellagio Center, and then as Executive Director of a new UCSF UC Berkeley program pioneering efforts to join AI, clinical and public health practice, and equity. In keeping with his earlier (analog) work on HIV, Wolfe has highlighted concerns about health systems using algorithms to gauge the merit of treatments for those regarded as socially suspect, the importance of moving beyond proprietary, black box algorithms toward an architecture of health data as a public good, and the need to maximize benefit for patients and communities, as well health systems, in the use of large language models.

== Books ==
- Wolfe, Daniel (1995). T. E. Lawrence. Lives of notable gay men and lesbians (1. print ed.). New York: Chelsea House Publishers. ISBN 0791023249.
- Wolfe, Daniel (2000). Men like us: the GMHC complete guide to gay men's sexual, physical, and emotional well-being (1st ed.). New York: Ballantine Books. ISBN 0-345-41496-9.
- Fairchild, Amy L.; Bayer, Ronald; Colgrove, James Keith; Wolfe, Daniel (2007). Searching eyes: privacy, the state, and disease surveillance in America. Berkeley : New York: University of California Press; Milbank Memorial Fund. ISBN 0520252020.
