= Philadelphia FIGHT =

U.S. nonprofit organization

- Formation: 1990
- Legal status: Non-profit
- Purpose: Philadelphia FIGHT provides comprehensive, equitable, and compassionate healthcare and support services for individuals and communities facing health disparities.
- Headquarters: Philadelphia, Pennsylvania
- Website: Philadelphia FIGHT

Philadelphia FIGHT (FIGHT) is a Philadelphia AIDS service organization that provides primary care, consumer education, advocacy and research. FIGHT was formed as a partnership of individuals living with HIV & AIDS and clinicians.

FIGHT is a non-profit organization, which is in part funded by the AIDS Activities Coordinating Office of Philadelphia.

== About ==
=== Mission ===
"Philadelphia FIGHT is a comprehensive AIDS Service Organization that provides state of the art, culturally competent HIV primary care, consumer education, advocacy, social services, outreach to people living with HIV, those who are at high risk for the disease, and access to the most advanced clinical research. Their goal and hope is to end the AIDS epidemic within the lifetime of those currently living with HIV."

=== History ===
FIGHT was founded in 1990.

=== Programs ===
- AIDS Library provides access to information on treatments, nutrition, and history of the pandemic, and referrals to regional and national resources.
- Critical Path AIDS Project was founded by Kiyoshi Kuromiya in 1987. Today FIGHT's program provides Internet access and digital literacy training to low-income people.
- Jonathan Lax Immune Disorders Treatments Center provides clinical care to people with HIV/AIDS. Clinicians also conduct research to test potential therapies for HIV/AIDS.
- Project TEACH (Treatment Education Activists Combating HIV) trains people living with HIV to act as community and peer educators, especially in low-income areas and communities of color.
- Youth Health Empowerment Project (Y-HEP) was founded in 1994 to reduce the spread of HIV and other sexually transmitted infections.
- Family Dentistry Center was founded in 2013 to provide high quality dental care, with an emphasis on reducing dental anxiety.
- Pediatric Health Center was founded in 2016 to serve low-income children and youth, regardless of insurance, income or immigration status.

=== Events ===
- AIDS Education Month: recognized every June, FIGHT organizes summits about HIV prevention as well as youth, faith, and prison issues. FIGHT also organizes citywide testing for National HIV Testing Day on June 27 with other local agencies, including: ActionAIDS, GALAEI, and the Mazzoni Center.

=== Controversies ===
- Racism Allegations
  - Philadelphia FIGHT has been accused of racist employment practices by several former staff members, many of whom have advocated for the removal of the CEO and Board and the establishment of new, anti-racist policies. Philadelphia FIGHT has denied all allegations of racism and discrimination.

== See also ==
- Kiyoshi Kuromiya
- Gloria Casarez
