= The Philadelphia Award =

Award given to citizens of Philadelphia

- Awarded for: Given each year to a citizen of the Philadelphia region who, during the preceding year, acted and served on behalf of the best interests of the community.
- Presented by: Edward William Bok (1921-1930); Board of Trustees of The Philadelphia Award (1930–current)
- First award: 1921 to Leopold Stokowski
- Currently held by: Estelle B. Richman
- Website: www.philadelphiaaward.org

The Philadelphia Award is an annual prize given to a Philadelphia resident for community service.

== Winners ==
- 2024 - Estelle B. Richman
- 2023 - Sharmain Matlock-Turner
- 2021 - Margaux Murphy
- 2020 - Ala Stanford
- 2020 - Brian L. Roberts
- 2019 - Rev. Luis Cortés, Jr.
- 2019 - Nicole Kligerman
- 2019 - Amy J. Goldberg
- 2018 - Sylvester Mobley
- 2017 - Mel Heifetz
- 2016 - Charles L. Blockson
- 2015 - Marsha Levick
- 2014 - Kenneth Gamble
- 2014 - Suzanne & Ralph Roberts
- 2013 - Leigh & John Middleton
- 2012 - Carl H. June, MD
- 2011 - Aileen K. Roberts & Joseph Neubauer
- 2010 - Alice S. Bast
- 2009 - Joan Myers Brown
- 2008 - H. Fitzgerald Gerry & Marguerite Lenfest
- 2007 - Marciene Mattleman
- 2006 - Leonore Annenberg
- 2005 - Paul R. Levy
- 2004 - Gloria Guard
- 2003 - Judith Rodin
- 2002 - Lorene Cary
- 2001 - Bernard C. Watson
- 2000 - Ernesta D. Ballard
- 1999 - Cecilia Moy Yep
- 1998 - Graham S. Finney
- 1997 - Anne d'Harnoncourt
- 1997 - Jane Golden
- 1996 - Arlin Adams
- 1995 - Edward G. Rendell
- 1995 - John F. Street
- 1994 - Jeremy Nowak
- 1993 - The Hon. Walter H. Annenberg
- 1992 - Denise Scott-Brown & Robert Venturi
- 1991 - Sr. Mary Scullion, RSM
- 1990 - Herman Mattleman
- 1989 - Hilary Koprowski
- 1988 - G. Stockton Strawbridge
- 1987 - Elaine Brown
- 1986 - Willard G. Rouse III
- 1985 - Rev. Paul M. Washington
- 1984 - Jennifer A. Allcock
- 1983 - Edmund N. Bacon
- 1982 - Carolyn L. Johnson
- 1981 - Edwin Wolf II
- 1980 - William M. Sample
- 1979 - Robert Austrian
- 1978 - Michael J. Sherman & Stephen Shutt
- 1977 - R. Stewart Rauch
- 1976 - Jonathan E. Rhoads
- 1975 - Robert W. Crawford
- 1975 - Perry C. Fennell, Jr.
- 1975 - Melvin Floyd
- 1975 - John C. Haas
- 1975 - Ruth W. Hayre
- 1975 - Floyd L. Logan
- 1975 - Sol Schoenbach
- 1975 - Irving W. Shandler
- 1974 - William Henry Hastie
- 1973 - Ruth Patrick
- 1972 - J. Presper Eckert & John W. Mauchly
- 1971 - Franklin C. Watkins
- 1970 - Louis I. Kahn
- 1969 - Eugene Ormandy
- 1968 - Marcus Albert Foster
- 1967 - Richardson Dilworth
- 1966 - Lessing J. Rosenwald
- 1965 - Rev. Leon H. Sullivan
- 1964 - Gaylord P. Harnwell
- 1963 - John H. Gibbon, Jr.
- 1962 - George W. Taylor
- 1961 - Edwin O. Lewis
- 1960 - Allston Jenkins
- 1959 - Harry A. Batten
- 1958 - Helen C. Bailey
- 1957 - Catherine Drinker Bowen
- 1956 - Isidor S. Ravdin
- 1955 - Joseph S. Clark, Jr.
- 1954 - Esmond R. Long
- 1953 - George Wharton Pepper
- 1952 - Francis Bosworth
- 1951 - Franklin H. Price
- 1950 - Fiske Kimball
- 1949 - Frederick H. Allen
- 1947 - Samuel S. Fels
- 1946 - Maurice B. Fagan & Marjorie Penney
- 1945 - Owen J. Roberts
- 1944 - William Draper Lewis
- 1943 - James M. Skinner
- 1942 - William Loren Batt
- 1940 - Marian Anderson
- 1939 - Thomas Sovereign Gates
- 1938 - Rufus M. Jones & Clarence Pickett
- 1937 - Alfred Newton Richards
- 1936 - George W. Wilkins
- 1935 - Francis Fisher Kane
- 1934 - Charles M.B. Cadwalader
- 1933 - Lucy Langdon Wilson
- 1932 - Earl D. Bond
- 1931 - The Unknown Citizen
- 1930 - Paul Philippe Cret
- 1929 - Cornelius McGillicuddy (Connie Mack)
- 1928 - Eli Kirk Price
- 1927 - W. Herbert Burk
- 1926 - Chevalier Jackson
- 1925 - Samuel Yellin
- 1924 - Charles C. Harrison
- 1923 - Samuel S. Fleisher
- 1922 - Russell H. Conwell
- 1921 - Leopold Stokowski
