= AIDS Activities Coordinating Office =

Office of the Philadelphia Department of Public Health

Agency overview
- Formed: 1987
- Jurisdiction: City of Philadelphia
- Headquarters: 1101 Market Street, 9th Floor, Philadelphia, Pennsylvania, U.S.
- Agency executive: Jane M. Baker, Director
- Website: http://www.phila.gov/health/aaco/

The AIDS Activities Coordinating Office (AACO) is a part of the Philadelphia Department of Public Health in Philadelphia. The office collects and reports epidemiological data, and oversees the AIDS service organizations which provide the bulk of medical case management for people infected with HIV. AACO administers federal, state and city funded HIV/AIDS core treatment and prevention programs in Philadelphia. The office also coordinates HIV/AIDS planning, and conducts HIV education and training.

== About ==
=== History ===
AACO was established by Mayor W. Wilson Goode in 1987 to manage the city's growing AIDS epidemic and the numerous community organizations that emerged to fight the disease. David Fair, a well-known local activist and union leader, was tapped as the agency's first director.

=== Services ===
AACO conducts and publishes epidemiological activities, organizes trainings for people in the field of HIV/AIDS prevention and treatment, and coordinates local HIV/AIDS planning.

The agency runs an information hotline, which is staffed by specialists who answer questions about HIV-related topics, make referrals to medical case management, and other free services for people living with HIV and those at risk of infection. The hotline also records complaints about HIV services.

AACO funds local AIDS service organizations including:

- ActionAIDS
- Mazzoni Center
- Philadelphia FIGHT
- Prevention Point Philadelphia
