= Michael S. Hinson Jr. =

American Black activist and community leader (1966–2022)

- Born: December 20, 1966; Wilmington, Delaware, U.S.
- Died: August 27, 2022 (aged 55); Philadelphia, Pennsylvania, U.S.
- Education: Cheyney University of Pennsylvania; John Dickinson High School
- Occupation: Advocate

Michael S. Hinson Jr. (1966–2022) was an American Black and LGBTQ activist, educator, and researcher who lived in Philadelphia, Pennsylvania, and was the chief executive officer of SELF, Inc.

== Life and works ==
Michael Hinson grew up in Wilmington, Delaware and Hemingway, South Carolina and graduated with a bachelor's degree in Legal Studies from Peirce College and a Masters in Public Administration from Cheyney University of Pennsylvania. At the time of his death in 2022, he was completing a Doctor of Public Administration at Capella University.

Hinson was also a prominent member of Philadelphia's Yoruba community, becoming a Yoruba priest in the early 1990s.

He was a founder and director of the Colours Organization in Philadelphia from 1991 to 2000, where he developed innovative programs addressing the broader health needs of Black LGBTQ people.

In this period, Hinson developed a variety of innovative outreach and education programs to combat the HIV/AIDS epidemic in the Black gay community, serving as a co-chair of the Philadelphia AIDS Community Planning Group, and contributing to "The Time to Act is Now!," a comprehensive set of recommendations on preventing HIV infection and AIDS in the wider African American Community.

In addition to the founding of Colours, he also played a pivotal role for many organizations in the city, lending his energy and talents to help strengthen the LGBTQ service infrastructure in Philadelphia. As part of this work, he helped found Philly Black Gay Pride in 1999 and was one of seven founders of the Black Gay Men's Leadership Council founded in 2006. He was also an integral member of the grass roots, community-based organization Black and Latinx Community Control of Health.

In 2005, in his role as LGBTQ+ liaison in the Street Administration, Hinson funded the LGBT Community Assessment, an assessment of the broad health related needs of LGBT populations in the Philadelphia region, and worked closely with community researchers Chris Bartlett and Heather Batson to complete the research. Through his leadership, the City of Philadelphia and Philadelphia Foundation subsequently funded an LGBT Youth Assessment, which he also envisioned and funded.

After leaving the Street administration, Hinson eventually began working as a leader nationally in Black and LGBTQ+ community organizing. He was one of the founders of the International Federation of Black Prides (now Center for Black Equity) and served as the board chair from 1999 to 2010. He was the IFBP/CBE Director of Programs from 2010 to 2018. In these roles, he helped increase IFBP/CBE membership from eight Black Prides to thirty-two Black Prides around the globe. Additionally, he invested in Black leaders nationally and internationally, bringing strategies he had implemented in Philadelphia to many other communities.

During the final leg of his career, Hinson turned his focus back to addressing homelessness in Philadelphia, an area that was part of his work during the Street administration. Hinson was a passionate advocate for people experiencing homelessness. From 2017 until his death in 2022, Hinson he served as the president and CEO of SELF, Inc., the city's largest provider of emergency and transitional housing, which doubled in size under his leadership and included the development of Way Home, a partnership with the William Way LGBT Community Center that provides rental assistance for LGBTQ+ people. Upon the onset of the COVID pandemic, Hinson also led efforts to assure that homeless people were protected and received the health services they needed when infected. Hinson's leadership on homeless issues resulted in his election as a co-chair of the Philadelphia Roadmap to Homes Committee, which determines priorities for the city's federal funding for homeless services. He also served as a board member of Philadelphia Family Voices, an organization supporting families of children with autism and other behavioral health challenges, and, as a member of the Philly Homes 4 Youth Coalition, advocated for homeless young people in Philadelphia, in particular those who had been in the foster care system.

Throughout his career, Hinson worked very closely with the three people he identified as his strongest mentors: David Fair, Tyrone Smith, and Rashidah Abdul-Khabeer. He built upon their commitments to insure the unapologetic centering of the voices of Black and Brown, LGBTQ, and other communities who benefited from his strong voice. He was well known for his mentorship of others, described as "a coach for a generation of Black LGBTQ leaders in Philadelphia."

Hinson said in a 2018 Philadelphia magazine interview "Even on the days when the weight of the challenges seems insurmountable and the loneliness of the roads traveled seems endless, I am forever grateful for the opportunities and platforms available to me to contribute in a small way to the humanity I know we all deserve."
