= David Fair =

American activist (born 1952)

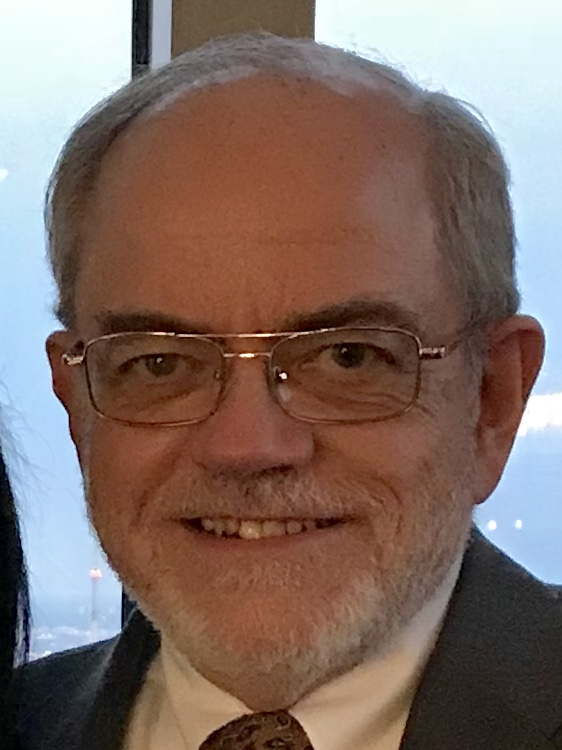
- Born: April 27, 1952 (age 74)
- Education: University of Pennsylvania
- Known for: LGBTQ Rights Activism

David Fair (born April 27, 1952) is an American civil rights activist and public service administrator.

== Early life ==
David Fair was born in Philadelphia.

He graduated from the University of Pennsylvania in 1975 with a degree in political science. While a student, he organized support for the impeachment of President Richard Nixon and founded the Penn Voters' Rights Council. In 1971, Fair won the federal lawsuit, Fair v. Osser (C.A. No. 71-2212), which established that Pennsylvania students have the right to vote with their campus addresses.

== Early activism ==
In 1976, Fair publicly identified as gay for the first time in a meeting at the Gay Community Center of Philadelphia. Following this, Fair became involved in a number of local LGBTQ organizations. In 1977, Fair was active in the organization Gays at Penn during their successful campaign to push the University of Pennsylvania into adopting a non-discriminatory sexual orientation policy.

In 1978, Fair led the effort to organize the Philadelphia Lesbian and Gay Task Force (PLGTF), which was active until the mid-2000s. The following year, he helped establish an LGBTQ health committee within the PLGTF. The committee later became the non-profit Lavender Health, later renamed the Mazzoni Center in honor of physician Peter Mazzoni.

== Labor and AIDS activism ==
=== Early labor and LGBTQ political organizing ===
In 1979, Fair and other local activists formed a mayoral campaign committee to support pro-LGBTQ City Councilman Lucien Blackwell.

Between 1980 and 1988, Fair worked for the healthcare workers’ union 1199C, where he promoted fair labor practices alongside advocating for wider LGBTQ support and acceptance.

=== Early HIV/AIDS activism ===
In the mid-1980s, Fair became involved in local responses to the HIV/AIDS epidemic, working with community organizations and municipal agencies.

During the early years of the HIV/AIDS epidemic, Fair encouraged the sitting mayor of Philadelphia, Wilson Goode, to create the Mayor's Commission on Health Emergencies, which became the first effort in Philadelphia's city government to create a local response to the AIDS epidemic. That same year, Fair gave the fledgling AIDS prevention organization Blacks Educating Blacks About Sexual Health Issues (BEBASHI) its first office space.

In 1986, Fair authored AIDS and Minorities in Philadelphia: A Crisis Ignored for BEBASHI and began participating in the organizing of African American and Latino LGBTQ community to combat the epidemic in their own communities. At the 1986 national convention of the National Association of Black and White Men Together, Fair gave the keynote speech on white gay racism, which was later published in Speaking for Our Lives: Historic Speeches and Rhetoric for Gay and Lesbian Rights 1892-2000. From that point until the mid-1990s, Fair contributed to anti-racism efforts in the LGBT and HIV/AIDS communities in Philadelphia.

In November 1987, Philadelphia Mayor Goode asked Fair to form the AIDS Activities Coordinating Office. Goode provided Fair with a $6 million allocation of unrestricted city funds, leading to the creation of a network of HIV-related services. Shortly after his appointment, Fair presented a speech to the Neighborhood Summit on AIDS, calling for a recognition that defeating AIDS meant organizing neighborhoods to combat HIV infection among groups including gay people of color, those fighting addiction, women, and others who had historically been ignored by AIDS organizations.

Fair left the AIDS office in 1990 to lead the city's only advocacy organization composed of people living with HIV, called We The People Living with AIDS/HIV of the Delaware Valley.

=== AIDS protest and direct action ===
In 1991, Fair was arrested and injured by Philadelphia police at an ACT-UP demonstration against President George H.W. Bush. As a result of a lawsuit filed against the Philadelphia Police Department, Fair received a settlement of $3,000 ($7164.14 in 2026 dollars).

== Children's services and advocacy ==
=== Nonprofit leadership and ongoing advocacy ===
He is also a founder of Philly Homes 4 Youth, the Quality Parenting Initiative, and the Philadelphia Coalition on Opioids and Children.

== Organizations founded ==
Fair founded and led nonprofit organizations and public initiatives focused on LGBTQ rights, public health, housing, and family services in Philadelphia.

In the late 1970s, Fair helped establish several LGBTQ advocacy initiatives in Philadelphia, including the Philadelphia Lesbian and Gay Task Force. In 1978, he founded the Philadelphia Gay Cultural Festival. In 1985, he founded the Philadelphia/Delaware Valley Union of the Homeless and became a spokesman. In 1987, he led the creation of the AIDS Activities Coordinating Office for the Philadelphia Department of Public Health. In the 2000s, he led the creation of the Division of Community-Based Prevention Services for the Philadelphia Department of Public Health, the Parenting Collaborative for the Philadelphia Department of Human Services, and the creation of the Quality Parenting Initiative for the Philadelphia Department of Human Services. In 2017, he co-founded Philly Homes 4 Youth, an advocacy group for homeless adolescents.

== Recognition and awards ==
In 1989–1990, Fair's work was recognized by the AIDS in the Barrio Conference, the Philadelphia Commission on Human Relations, the Philadelphia Fellowship Commission, Unity/Philadelphia, Dignity/Philadelphia, the Philadelphia City Council, and the Mayor's Office.

Fair produced a video Epidemic: The AIDS Emergency in Philadelphia, for which he received the Communicator of the Year Award from the Public Relations Society of Southeastern Pennsylvania and a CINE Award for Video Excellence.

In 2024, Fair was inducted into the Philadelphia LGBTQ+ Hall of Fame. In 2025, Fair's activism was featured in the third season of HBO Max's Eyes on the Prize, which examined efforts to address the AIDS epidemic in communities of color during the late 1980s.

He has also received The Philadelphia Inquirer Citizen Award, the City of Philadelphia Human Rights Award, and the Philadelphia Gay News Legacy Award. By 2025, he had received over 50 community service awards from a variety of public and private agencies.
