= Gloria Casarez =

American civil rights leader and LGBT activist (1971–2014)

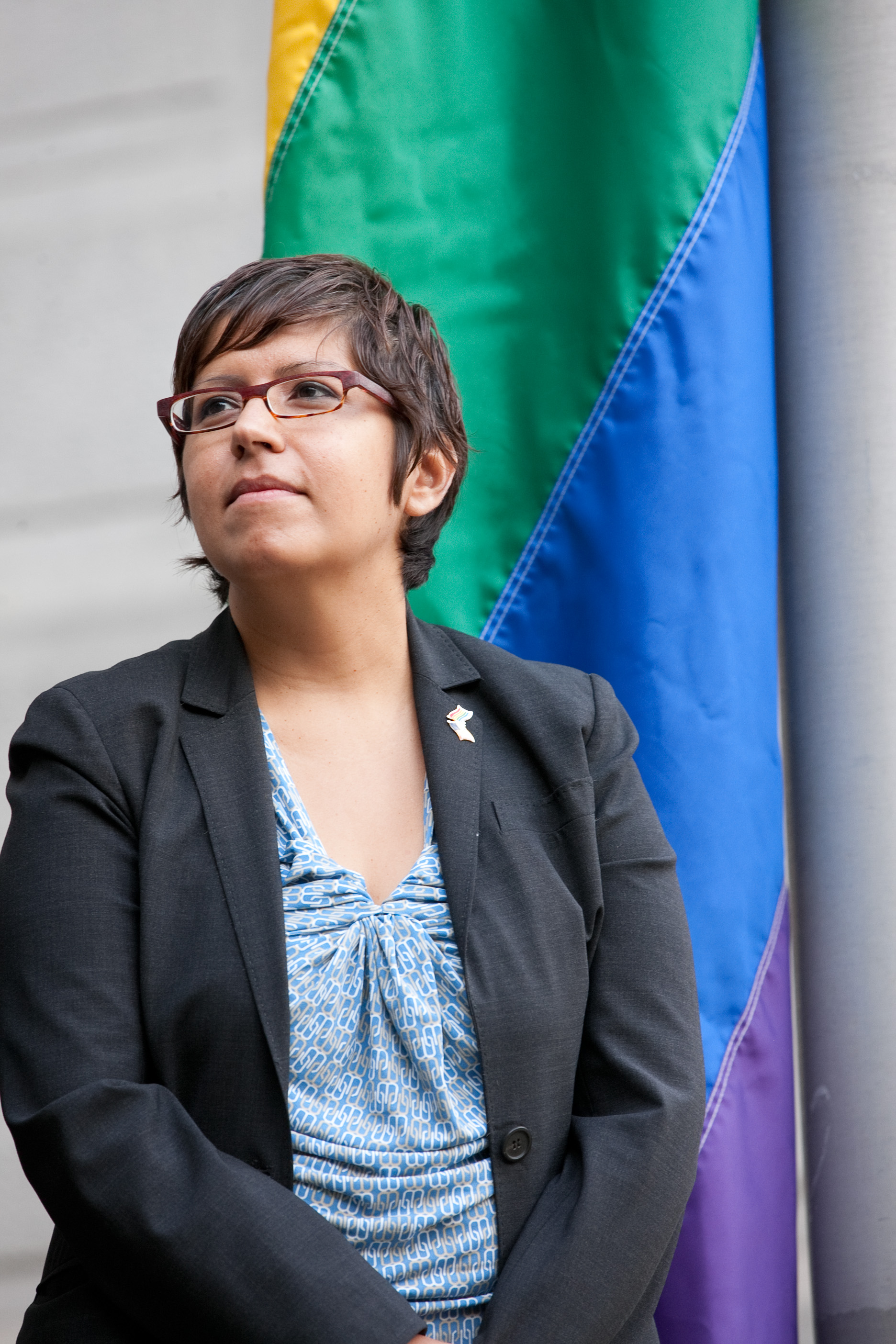
- Casarez in 2010
- Born: December 13, 1971; Philadelphia, Pennsylvania, US
- Died: October 19, 2014 (aged 42); Philadelphia, Pennsylvania, US
- Monuments: Philadelphia City Hall Historical Marker
- Education: West Chester University
- Occupation: City of Philadelphia Director of LGBT Affairs
- Known for: Social justice, civil rights, LGBTQ activism
- Spouse: Tricia Dressel (m. 2011)

Gloria Casarez (December 13, 1971 – October 19, 2014) was an American civil rights leader born in Philadelphia.

In 2008, Casarez became Philadelphia's first director of LGBTQ Affairs. In this role, she led initiatives that improved housing, access to healthcare, and workplace protections for LGBTQ+ individuals. She helped establish Philadelphia as a national model for inclusivity and equity and the city earned the top ranking for LGBT equality in the nation.

Casarez also worked on issues such as anti-poverty efforts, women's rights, HIV/AIDS prevention, homelessness, and youth outreach. She died in 2014 at the age of 42 from metastatic breast cancer.

== Early life and activism ==
Casarez was born at Methodist Hospital in South Philadelphia and raised Catholic. She spent her early years living with her mom in the Kensington neighborhood of Philadelphia, attending Sheridan Elementary School. Later, she moved to the Westmont section of Haddon Township, New Jersey, to live with her great-aunt and great-uncle, where she graduated from Haddon Township High School in 1989. At the age of 17, Casarez came out as a lesbian, marking the beginning of her lifelong journey as an advocate for LGBTQ+ rights.

Casarez attended West Chester University, where she earned a Bachelor of Arts in Criminal Justice and a Bachelor of Science in Political Science in 1993. During her time there, she was involved in student government and political activism. She served as President of the Latino Student Union and represented the university on the Commission on the Status of Women, a statewide network addressing women's issues on campus. Casarez was also recognized as a William G. Rohrer Scholar, highlighting her academic and leadership achievements.

In 2005, Casarez furthered her education by completing an Executive Leadership Program at the University of Pennsylvania, enhancing her skills and expertise in organizational leadership and advocacy.

== Civil rights and community organizing leadership ==
=== Early advocacy and leadership in LGBTQ+ and social justice movements ===
From 1991 to 1996, Casarez was a founding member and community organizer for Empty the Shelters, a national student- and youth-led organization advocating for housing rights and economic justice. In Philadelphia, she collaborated with local movements such as the Kensington Welfare Rights Union and the Union of the Homeless. Casarez played a key role in developing and organizing student engagement initiatives, including the Summer of Social Action and Spring Break for a Change, which mobilized students on campuses nationwide to participate in social justice efforts.

From 1995 to 1998, Casarez served as the Program Coordinator for the LGBT Center at the University of Pennsylvania, one of the nation's oldest and most active centers of its kind. In this role, she developed innovative mentorship programs and initiatives specifically designed to support LGBTQ+ students of color, transgender students, and queer students on campus.

At the age of 27, Casarez became the executive director of the Gay and Lesbian Latino AIDS Education Initiative (GALAEI) in Philadelphia, a position she held from 1999 to 2008. Under her leadership, GALAEI's funding tripled, and the organization launched groundbreaking programs that gained national recognition. These included Philadelphia's first mobile HIV testing centers and the Trans-health Information Project, the city's first health initiative focused on transgender individuals. Casarez's work at GALAEI significantly expanded services for men of color and transgender communities.

=== Community organizing and leadership ===
Casarez's work demonstrated a continuing interest in constituent led and community organizing efforts, starting with her early participation in social justice and political action movements. An early advocate of harm reduction, Casarez co-chaired the board of directors for Prevention Point Philadelphia, Philadelphia's only syringe exchange, from 1999 to 2003.

She served as a longtime board member and leader of the Bread and Roses Community Fund, a public foundation that supports grassroots organizations working for racial and economic justice. Casarez served as an inaugural member of the Fund's Jonathan Lax Scholarship Committee from 2001 until her death in 2014. Bread & Roses Executive Director Casey Cook recalled Casarez as a fierce agent for real change. "Bread & Roses is just one among many communities enriched by Gloria's leadership, courage, and strength," said Casey. "Gloria will be remembered at Bread & Roses as an extraordinary organizer, a brilliant strategist, and a committed board member," said Denise Brown, Bread & Roses board co-chair. "Gloria embodied the mission and intention of this organization with equal parts fierceness and humility."

Casarez was a member of the LGBT Research Community Advisory Board of Public Health Management Corporation.Casarez served as an ex-officio member for the Philadelphia LGBT Police Liaison Committee since 2008, working with community leaders and police officials to address LGBT public-safety issues, and taking part in LGBT-sensitivity training sessions for incoming Philadelphia police officers. Casarez was a founding board member of the LGBT Elder Initiative started in 2010. Casarez served on the Philadelphia Convention and Visitors Bureau's PHL Diversity board.

She was also a founder of the Philadelphia Dyke March, Mr. Philadelphia Drag King, and the House of (Manolo) Blahnik Board of Directors.

In April 2013, Casarez engaged in Latino community organizing efforts to save La Milagrosa, Philadelphia's first Spanish-speaking church. Casarez's great-grandparents helped establish the church in the early 1900s.

== Establishment of Philadelphia's Office of LGBT Affairs ==
Starting in the mid-1980s, successive Philadelphia mayors created various boards and commissions to focus on the needs of sexual minority and LGBT communities. In 1984, Mayor Wilson Goode established the first Philadelphia Commission on Sexual Minorities, appointing Darlene Garner as its executive director. David Acosta, founder of GALAEI, became the first Latino appointed to the commission. In 1990, Oscar Garcia-Vera was named co-chair of the Commission under Mayor Goode and continued in this role during Mayor Ed Rendell's tenure. In 2001, Mayor John F. Street formed a 15-member board to advise him on LGBT issues, mirroring Mayor Goode's commission. From 2001 to 2008, Michael Hinson Jr. served as the Assistant Managing Director under Mayor Street and as the liaison to the LGBT community.

In 2008, Casarez made history when Mayor Michael Nutter appointed her as Philadelphia's first Director of LGBT Affairs. Mayor Nutter established the Office of LGBT Affairs by executive order that same year. This appointment marked the first time a salaried position within the Mayor's Office was dedicated to serving the LGBT community directly from Philadelphia City Hall. At the press conference announcing her appointment, Casarez vowed to "represent the community with authenticity, integrity, and respect."

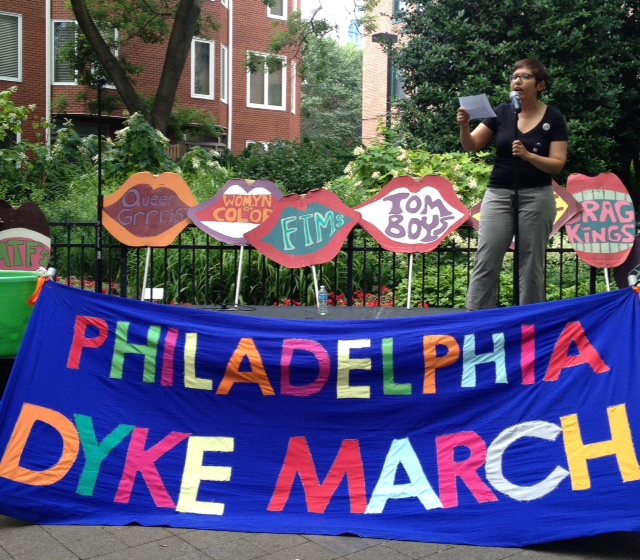
Casarez at the 2012 Philadelphia Dyke March at Kahn Park

Casarez led the efforts of the Mayor's Office of LGBT Affairs and the Mayor's advisory board from 2008 until her death in 2014. In her role, Casarez developed priorities for the city on public safety, education, economic development, health, city services, and civil rights. The Office of LGBT Affairs worked to ensure equitable working and living conditions for lesbian, gay, bisexual, transgender, and queer (LGBTQ) people, advocating for LGBT issues across all areas of city government. In 2012, Philadelphia earned the second-highest ranking nationwide for LGBT equality in the inaugural edition of the Human Rights Campaign Municipal Equality Index, ranking first among the ten largest U.S. cities and the highest among cities without statewide legal protections for LGBT people.

In 2015, the Office of LGBT Affairs became a permanent part of the city's charter after being ratified by Philadelphia voters. Mayor Nutter expressed pride in Casarez's legacy, saying, "When I became mayor, I was proud to establish the Mayor’s Office of Lesbian, Gay, Bisexual and Transgender (LGBT) Affairs and appoint the late Gloria Casarez as its first director. Making this office permanent under the City of Philadelphia charter ensures that the LGBT community will continue to be represented in city government, and that the good work done to advance LGBT issues over the last seven years will carry on well into the future."

Under Casarez's leadership, Philadelphia enacted the most comprehensive LGBT rights protections in the nation when Mayor Nutter signed Bill No. 130224 into law. She served as Director of LGBT Affairs until her death in October 2014.

== Honors and impact ==
In 1999, Out Magazine named Casarez one of the "100 Most Influential Leaders of the New Millennium." She also received the Philadelphia Out Proud Award and served as the 2001 Philadelphia LGBT Pride Grand Marshal.

Casarez was honored by the National Association for the Advancement of Colored People (NAACP) with the Annual Community Service Award in recognition of her social and political justice activism. Her work supporting LGBT ballroom communities earned her the Humanitarian Award at the House of Prestige's 20th Anniversary Renaissance Ball and the Community Service Award at the House of Blahnik Ball.

She was also recognized by Philadelphia FIGHT with the Kiyoshi Kuromiya Award for Justice and by the Philadelphia Bar Association with the Cheryl Ingram Advocate for Justice Award. Casarez received the Hero Award from the Delaware Valley Legacy Fund, joining past honorees such as gay rights pioneer Barbara Gittings and Pennsylvania Governor Ed Rendell. In 2013, the Gay and Lesbian Latino AIDS Education Initiative (GALAEI) honored her with the David Acosta Revolutionary Leader Award.

National and local media outlets recognized Casarez's contributions as well. Go Magazine included her in "100 Women We Love" and featured her as a "Woman at the Helm." Philadelphia Magazine included her in its "Who's Who of Philly's Gay Community." Philly Gay Calendar selected her as the 2009 "Person of the Year," and she received the Philadelphia Leadership Award from Women's eNews. The Metropolitan Community Church presented her with the Patron of Humanity Award at their 40th Anniversary Convocation Service, and in 2010, Dignity USA honored her with a Community Service Award.

Casarez also made history in Philadelphia sports: she threw out the ceremonial first pitch at Citizens Bank Park before a Philadelphia Phillies game against the Houston Astros on August 23, 2010.

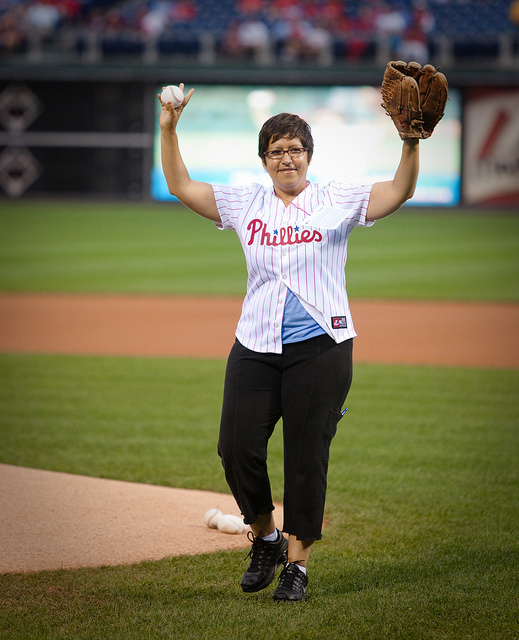
Casarez 'first pitch' at the Philadelphia Phillies game, Citizen's Bank Park on August 23, 2010. Photo: Mitchell Leff and the City of Philadelphia

In 2012, Casarez was inducted into West Chester University’s Legacy of Leadership. She was named the Philadelphia Pride Grand Marshal in both 2001 and 2014. In 2014, she received the Keystone Award from the Pennsylvania Youth Action Conference, where she addressed a crowd of student leaders at the University of Pennsylvania, encouraging them to continue their fight for social justice. She emphasized the importance of inclusivity, stating:

"I want to encourage you to continue to fight, continue to push, and make your communities the best they can be... Our mandate, really, is that everyone needs to be at the table. I come out of community organizing, and you don’t win the righteous wins unless you have all the voices at the table. So in anything that we’re doing, it’s really important to have many voices at the table, the people who are with you, the people who aren’t with you yet, and the people who are going to help you get where you need to go. So that is something I am encouraging you to do, have the naysayers as well as the yes people at your table. You need everybody... At the end of the day, and I’ve said this before, and I’ll say it again, at the end of the day, a big part of what we do is about love. When I first started my work in activism and organizing I used to say, 'I’m angry, I’m fired up,' and I was, but I was also approaching this work from a standpoint of love."

== Personal life and legacy ==
=== Marriage ===
Casarez was a passionate advocate for LGBT marriage equality. She married her long-time partner, Tricia Dressel, on August 12, 2011, in a private civil ceremony at the Manhattan Marriage Bureau, three weeks after New York State passed the Marriage Equality Act.

On September 3, 2011, Mayor Michael Nutter of Philadelphia officiated his first-ever same-sex commitment ceremony for the couple at their ten-year anniversary celebration held at the Samuel S. Fleisher Art Memorial in Philadelphia. Speaking to the Philadelphia Gay News, Casarez reflected on the significance of their decision to marry: "When we purchased our home together, we thought this is a new level, we're committing to this 30-year mortgage together. And in 10 years, we've navigated a lot of hard stuff together, so when we decided to get married, I was thinking it was this action, this thing we did, but it's more than that. We had been joking originally, ‘Let’s get gay married,’ but this isn't ‘gay marriage,’ this is marriage. This is significant."

On May 20, 2014, a federal judge ruled in Whitewood v. Wolf that Pennsylvania’s ban on same-sex marriage was unconstitutional, requiring the state to recognize same-sex marriages. This ruling legally recognized Casarez and Dressel’s 2011 marriage, affirming their legal marriage in their home city and state of Philadelphia, Pennsylvania just three months before Casarez's death.

=== Health and death ===
Casarez was diagnosed with metastatic inflammatory breast cancer in March 2009. During her treatment, she chronicled her experiences in The Word: A Breast-Cancer Blog, published by the Philadelphia Gay News, sharing her journey as a woman living and working with cancer. In 2012, she was honored with the Breast Survivor Award by the Susan G. Komen Breast Cancer Foundation.

Philadelphia Mayor Michael Nutter reflected on how "She never wanted the focus to be on her; she was always deflecting or deferring to others. She would really only talk about how she felt if you asked her. She wasn’t walking around talking about herself or her health issues. I would see her in the hallway and say, 'Hey, how are you doing?' and she'd just say, 'Coming along, getting better.' And I know it wasn’t always necessarily true. But she was a fighter."

After battling metastatic breast cancer for over five years, Casarez died on October 19, 2014, at the Hospital of the University of Pennsylvania. Her wife described her as "a fighter to the end."

Two weeks before her death, Casarez led the LGBT flag-raising ceremony at Philadelphia's City Hall for LGBT History Month. In 2010, Casarez had started the tradition of raising the LGBT rainbow flag at a municipal building in Philadelphia, marking a historic moment for the city's LGBTQ+ community.

==== Memorial ====
On October 20, 2014, in honor of Casarez's death, Philadelphia lowered the LGBT rainbow flag at City Hall to half-mast. Her funeral was held at Arch Street Methodist Church and was led by Pastor Robin Hynicka.

To honor Casarez's memory, the Philadelphia Gay Tourism Caucus launched the "Show Your True Colors for Gloria" campaign, urging the community and businesses to display rainbow flags in windows of stores, bars, restaurants, offices, shops, and homes throughout Philadelphia.

Philadelphia FIGHT, an organization dedicated to HIV/AIDS advocacy, had honored Casarez with the Kiyoshi Kuromiya Award in 2011 for her years of activism on behalf of disenfranchised Latinx LGBTQ youth. Following her death, FIGHT shared: "Gloria wasn’t just a policymaker and activist. She was a kind, generous, and fun person. She bravely fought her cancer for many years and even as a cancer patient, she remained an activist, often refusing to cover her head or hide her diagnosis. Everybody loved Gloria, and we will all miss her very much."

Civil rights activist and community organizer AJ Hikes also reflected on Casarez's legacy, stating: "Her light was so bright, it lit the way for all of us. She used her energy to build up those around her and support our dreams and our talents. Gloria guided this community in ways most of us do not know or even understand. She was a leader for LGBTQ people in this city for sure, but to this queer brown girl, she was a giant, a living legend, proof that there was a place for queer people of color in this community."

== Posthumous honors ==
=== Posthumous awards and recognition ===
Casarez received several posthumous awards in recognition of her contributions to LGBTQ+ advocacy and social justice.

In November 2014, the Diabolique Foundation honored her with the Lifetime Service Award at the Diabolique Ball. Later that year, in December 2014, the I Am Human Campaign of the BEBASHI organization presented Casarez with the Governmental Liaison Award.

In 2015, she was awarded the Lifetime Legacy Award by the Delaware Valley Legacy Fund and the Sadie T. M. Alexander Leadership Award by the Philadelphia Commission on Human Relations (PCHR).

=== Recognition as a "game changer" in Pennsylvania ===
In April 2019, Casarez was featured in an exhibit sponsored by Pennsylvania First Lady Frances Wolf at the Governor's Mansion. The exhibit highlighted 32 Pennsylvania women recognized as "Game Changers." Alongside Casarez, other notable Philadelphia women included actress and princess Grace Kelly, opera singer Marian Anderson, civil rights activist Sadie T.M. Alexander, and LGBTQ+ rights pioneer Barbara Gittings. The exhibit is now permanently housed at the State Museum of Pennsylvania.

=== Honored as one of West Chester University's most influential women ===
In 2021, the President's Commission on the Status of Women at West Chester University named Casarez one of the 150 most influential women in the university's history as part of its 150th-anniversary celebration.

=== "Gloria Casarez Way" and public honors ===
In 2015, the Philadelphia City Council passed a resolution to rename the 200 block of South 12th Street in Center City as "Gloria Casarez Way" in her honor. This street was also the site of Michelle Angela Ortiz's mural, A Tribute to Gloria Casarez, which celebrated her contributions to Philadelphia.

=== The Gloria Casarez Residence ===
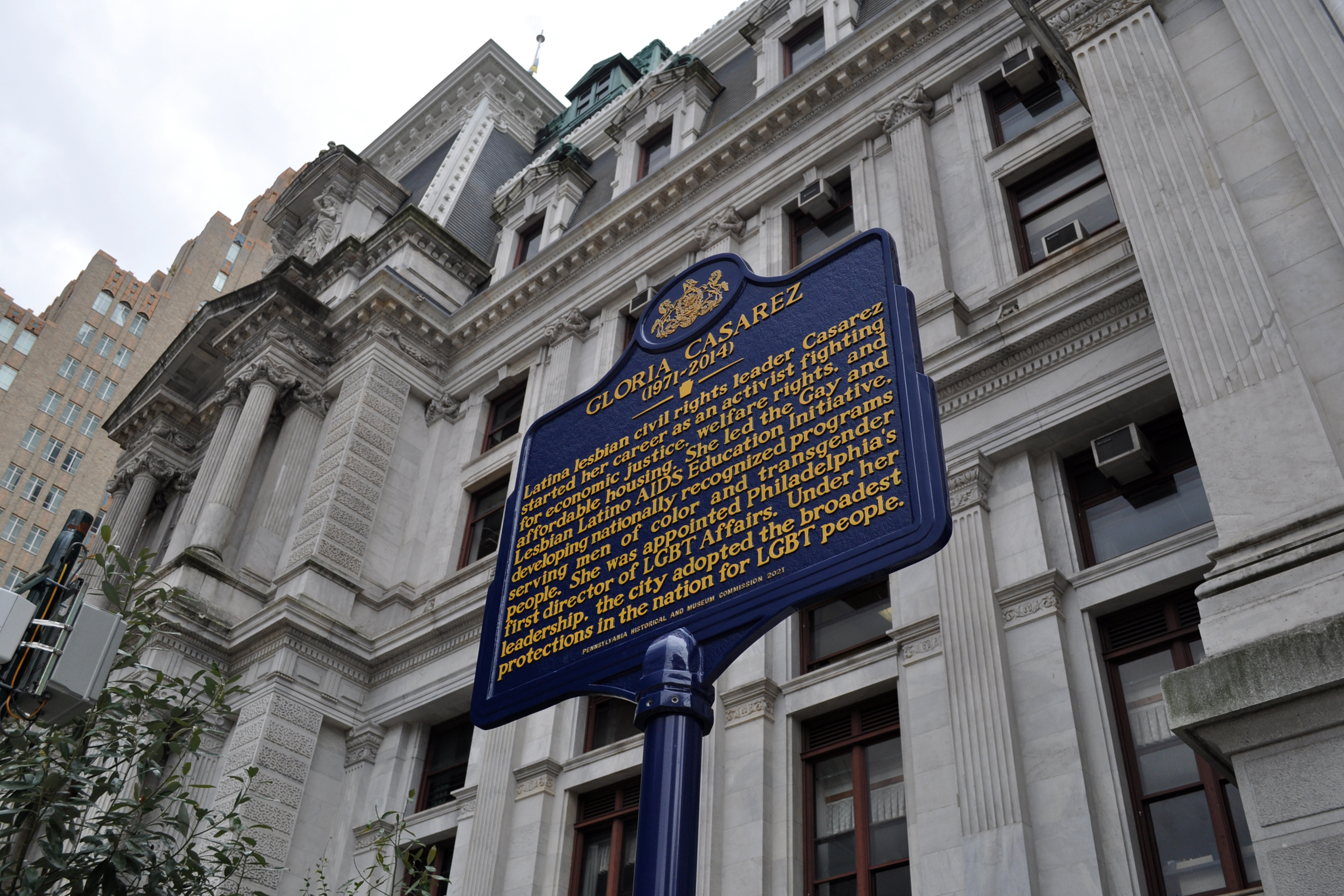
Gloria Casarez Historical Marker at City Hall, 1 S. Penn Sq., Philadelphia PA

The Gloria Casarez Residence, named in her honor, opened on May 14, 2019. Operated by Project HOME, the residence provides LGBTQ-friendly affordable housing for young adults who are homeless, at risk of homelessness, or aging out of foster care. It is the first permanent supportive housing facility of its kind in Pennsylvania and among the first in the nation.

=== Gloria Casarez State Historical Marker ===
On October 8, 2021, a state historical marker commemorating Casarez was installed at Philadelphia's City Hall. The installation ceremony coincided with National LGBTQ History Month as well as Breast Cancer Awareness Month and National Hispanic Heritage Month. During the event, the rainbow flag was raised in her honor.

Approved in 2020 by the Pennsylvania Historical and Museum Commission, the historical marker's installation was delayed due to the COVID-19 pandemic. The marker garnered national attention as the first in Pennsylvania to honor a person of Latin or Hispanic descent, joining several other LGBTQ-related markers already present in Philadelphia.

The nomination for the marker was submitted by John Anderies, Director of the John J. Wilcox Archives at the William Way LGBT Community Center in Philadelphia. Support letters came from notable figures, including public historian Susan Ferentinos, author of Interpreting LGBT History at Museums and Historic Sites; Rafael Álvarez Febo, executive director of the Pennsylvania Commission on LGBTQ Affairs; and Philadelphia Mayor Jim Kenney.

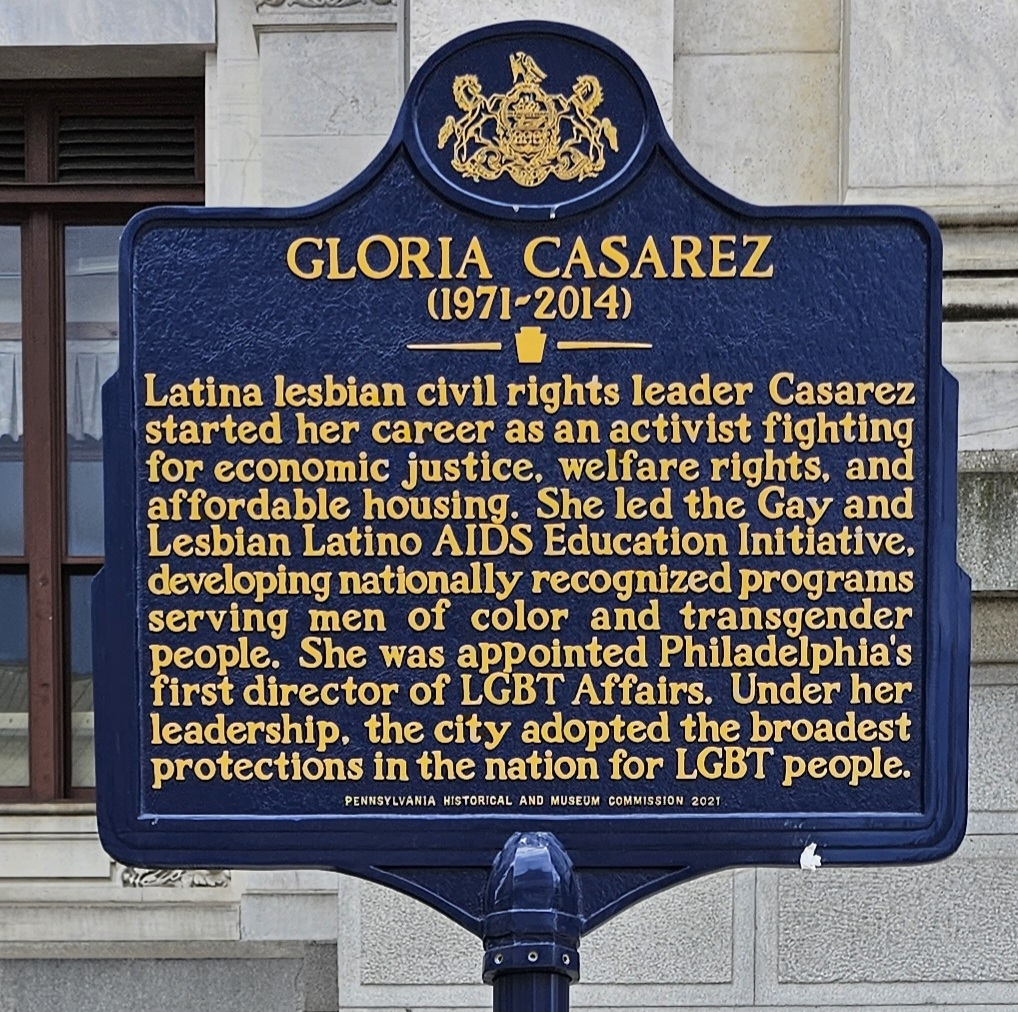
The plaque outside of Philadelphia City Hall

In her letter of support, Ferentinos wrote, "Casarez stands as a role model for younger activists, particularly those who are LGBTQ and/or Latinx. These are populations sadly lacking in role models from history due to the erasure of their predecessors from the national historical narrative. Preserving the memory of Gloria Casarez is a step toward rectifying this situation."

At the unveiling ceremony for Casarez's historical marker at Philadelphia City Hall, social worker Ninoshka Montas, a fellow alumna of West Chester University, reflected on Casarez's enduring impact. Montas stated, "Gloria's groundbreaking work sparks a fire inside of me to lead by example and follow in her footprints to advocate for my community. Her work nurtures the Latina dreamer from Philadelphia that lives inside of me, and I hope it also sparks a fire in each of you. Gloria is an example of what happens when you combine hard work, dedication, passion, and love."

=== Gloria Casarez Elementary School ===
In June 2022, administrators at Philip H. Sheridan School announced that the school would be renamed Gloria Casarez Elementary School, following a community-wide vote. Built in 1899–1900, the school was originally named after Union Civil War General Philip Sheridan.

Assistant Principal Julio Nunez explained the renaming process: “We were looking to find a name that represented our school and the goal of inclusion.” Casarez, a civil rights leader and LGBTQ+ advocate who had attended Sheridan Elementary, received 46% of the vote, securing the majority over three other candidates. Nunez highlighted the strong support from students, saying, “The majority of the students voted, and the majority selected her [Casarez]. We’re very proud that we now stand with her for inclusion as we move forward."

The renaming honors Casarez's legacy and her impact on the Philadelphia community, aligning with the school's commitment to inclusivity and representation.

== Murals and Community Art ==
Philadelphia has honored Casarez's legacy through numerous murals and community art projects, celebrating her contributions to LGBTQ+ rights and civil advocacy.

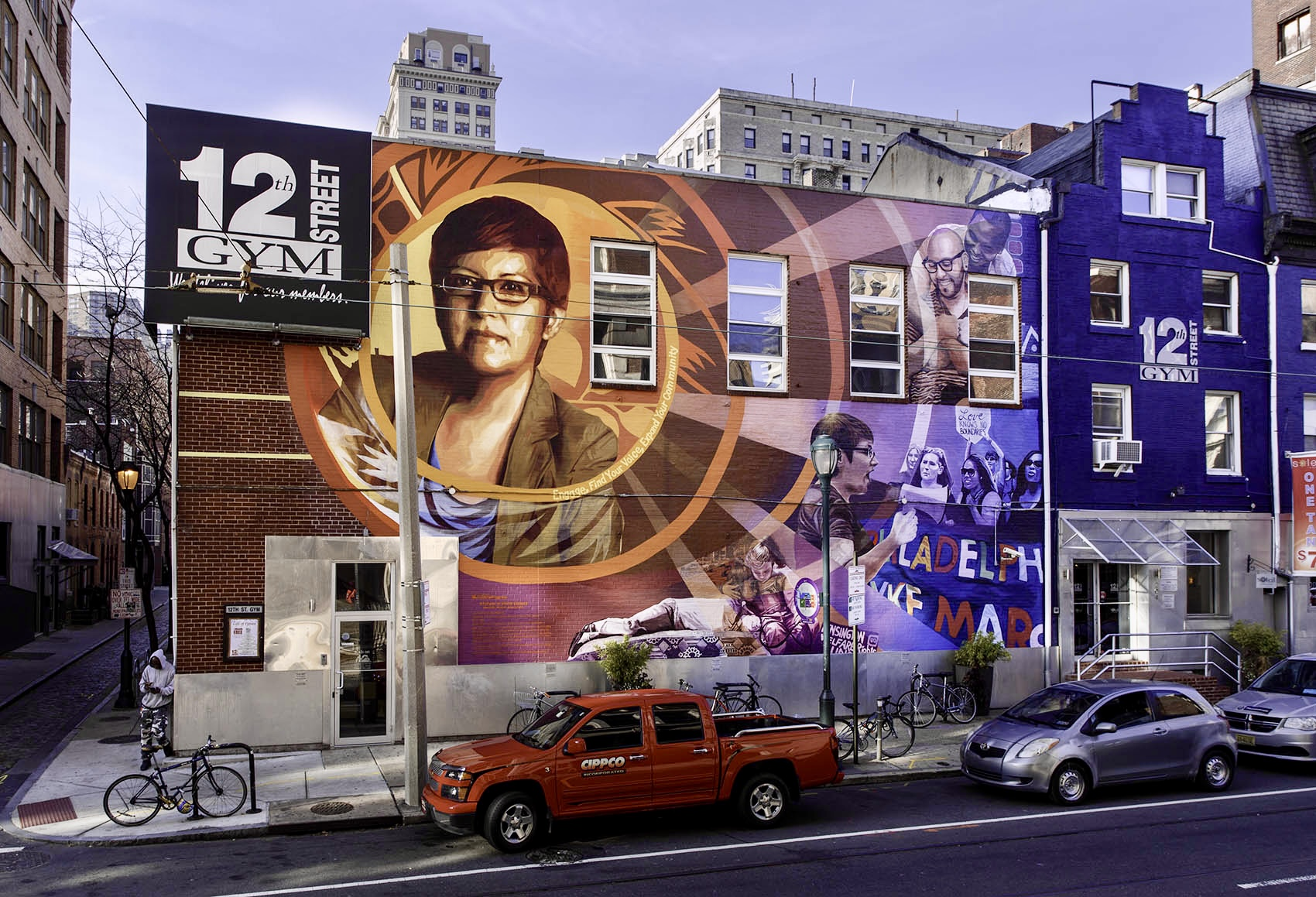
Gloria Casarez Mural on 12th Street

=== Gloria Casarez mural on 12th Street ===
On October 11, 2015, during Philadelphia's Outfest celebration, a two-story mural titled A Tribute to Gloria Casarez was unveiled on the 12th Street Gym's exterior wall. Created by renowned visual artist and educator Michelle Angela Ortiz, alongside Briana Dawkins, the mural quickly became a significant landmark in the LGBTQ+ community of Philadelphia. The mural was created to honor Casarez's legacy, celebrating her tireless advocacy for LGBTQ+ rights and marginalized communities.

In 2018, Michelle Angela Ortiz learned that Midwood Investment and Developers had purchased the 12th Street Gym property where her mural was created. Ortiz, Mural Arts Philadelphia, and Midwood initially engaged in conversations about preserving the mural as development plans progressed. However, in June 2020, Ortiz was informed that Midwood intended to demolish the building, which would destroy the mural that had been created with the involvement of Casarez's family, close friends, and the communities she championed.

In response, Ortiz worked closely with Mural Arts for several months, advocating for the preservation of Casarez's mural and exploring ways to expand the work to honor the narratives of BIPOC LGBTQ+ ancestors. Ortiz said, “Gloria fought for us, so I fought for Gloria.” Despite their efforts, on December 23, 2020, Ortiz discovered that the mural had been whitewashed without prior notice to either her or Mural Arts. This act of erasure, Ortiz stated, felt like a painful loss of Casarez once again.

Ortiz shared her feelings in a statement: "This action is painful for all of us who feel that we are losing Gloria again with the whitewashing and demolition of her image. Midwood’s action has affected all the trust and work we have been building with the community so far. My values are not in alignment with their process." In protest, Ortiz projected an image of the original mural back onto the whitewashed wall with the message, "YOU CAN'T ERASE OUR HISTORY." Ortiz announced that she would cease her agreement with Midwood, and Mural Arts also withdrew from the project. Ortiz concluded her statement by expressing gratitude for the opportunity to honor Casarez through her artwork while affirming her commitment to the community. She also stood in solidarity with Casarez's family and advocates, continuing to fight for resistance, visibility, and community power in the face of gentrification.

=== Art and advocacy ===
In December 2016, Christian Lovehall, a Black trans poet, musician, and trans-rights activist, known as "WORDZ The Poet Emcee," dedicated a song titled See Ya Later in Casarez's memory. The song, available on iTunes, incorporated excerpts from a speech Casarez gave at the 2014 Philadelphia Dyke March.

In March 2020, as part of the #SisterlyLove Project, artist Hope Hummingbird created a porcelain portrait of Casarez for a street art exhibition celebrating Women's History Month.

Subsequent tributes to Casarez include a mural unveiled on October 8, 2021, at Giovanni's Room Bookstore, titled Finding Our Happy. This piece, created by Philly-based LGBTQ+ artists Nilé Livingston, Nicole Nikolich, Marisa Velázquez-Rivas, and curator Conrad Benner, celebrated her impact.

In January 2021, queer street artist Tish Urquhart wheat-pasted a large image of Casarez at the Franklin Club, near the site of Ortiz's original mural. However, this tribute was removed just days later.

Other notable works include a live portrait of Casarez by artist Alloyius Mcilwaine, painted during the Haddon Township LGBT Pride Festival in June 2021. This portrait is now permanently housed at Haddon Township High School, where Casarez was an alumna.

In September 2021, Cuban/Egyptian muralist Symone Salib created My Existence is Resistance, a mural in collaboration with the Philadelphia Latino Film Festival and Philadelphia Mural Arts. Located in Norris Square, it honors Casarez's leadership and advocacy for marginalized communities.

During the June 2022 Philadelphia Pride March, the PHL Pride Collective and Philly Dyke March recreated Ortiz's mural as a large-scale replica displayed at its original site. Casarez's foundational role in the Philly Dyke March was a central theme of the event.

In June 2023, American poet, writer, performer, and educator Denice Frohman featured Casarez in Esto No Tiene Nombre, a one-woman show celebrating the oral histories of Latina lesbian elders, underscoring Casarez's lasting influence.

== See also ==
- Civil Rights Leaders
- LGBT Rights Activists
- Philadelphia Gay News
- LGBT social movements
- Michael Nutter
