= Franklin H. Price =

Librarian from Philadelphia (1882–1958)

Franklin Haines Price
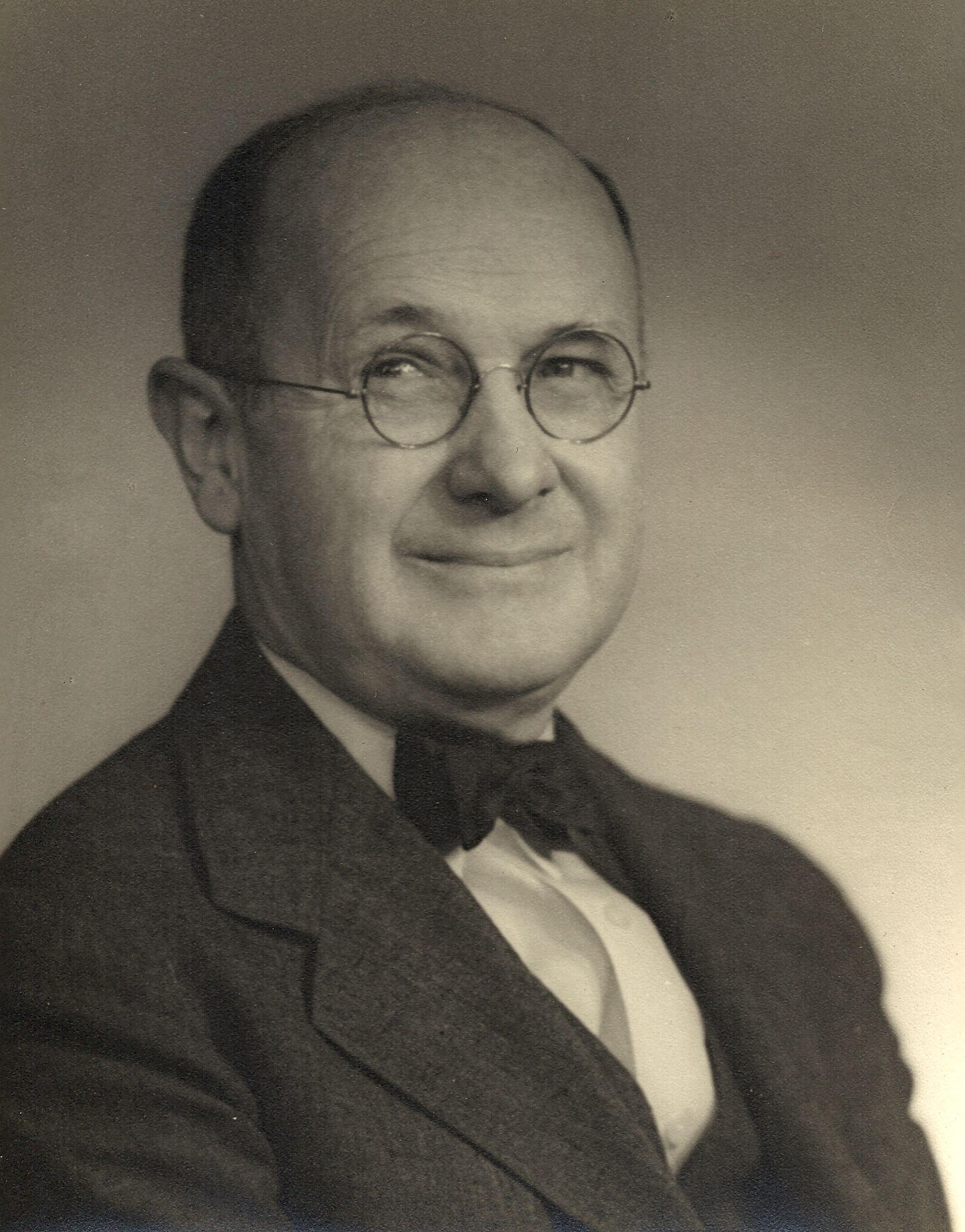
- Chief Librarian of the Free Library of Philadelphia
- Born: July 3, 1882; Philadelphia, Pennsylvania, U.S.
- Died: January 7, 1958 (aged 75); Bryn Mawr, Pennsylvania, U.S.
- Education: Palm's Business College
- Alma mater: University of Pennsylvania (Hon. MA)
- Occupation: Librarian
- Employer: Free Library of Philadelphia
- Title: Chief Librarian (1934–1951)
- Spouse: Alice Henrietta Howe
- Children: Franklin H. Price Jr., Dr. Allison H. Price, Lewis H. Price
- Awards: Philadelphia Award (1951)

Franklin Haines Price (July 3, 1882 – January 7, 1958) was an American librarian and a key figure in the growth of the Free Library of Philadelphia. Serving as Chief Librarian from 1934 to 1951, he oversaw the institution's growth into the third largest library system in the United States. In 1952, he was the 31st recipient of the Philadelphia Award for his 52 years of service to the cultural life of the city.

== Early life and career ==
Franklin Haines Price was born in Philadelphia to Ferris Thomas Price and Mary Pine Haines. He began his career at the Free Library in 1899 as an assistant. He attended local grade schools and graduated from Palm's Business College. In 1951, he was awarded an honorary Master of Letters degree by the University of Pennsylvania.

During World War I, Price served as supervisor of the Philadelphia district and nearby Army camps for the American Library Association (ALA) War Service. In 1919, he organized the Philadelphia office of the American Merchant Marine Library Association.

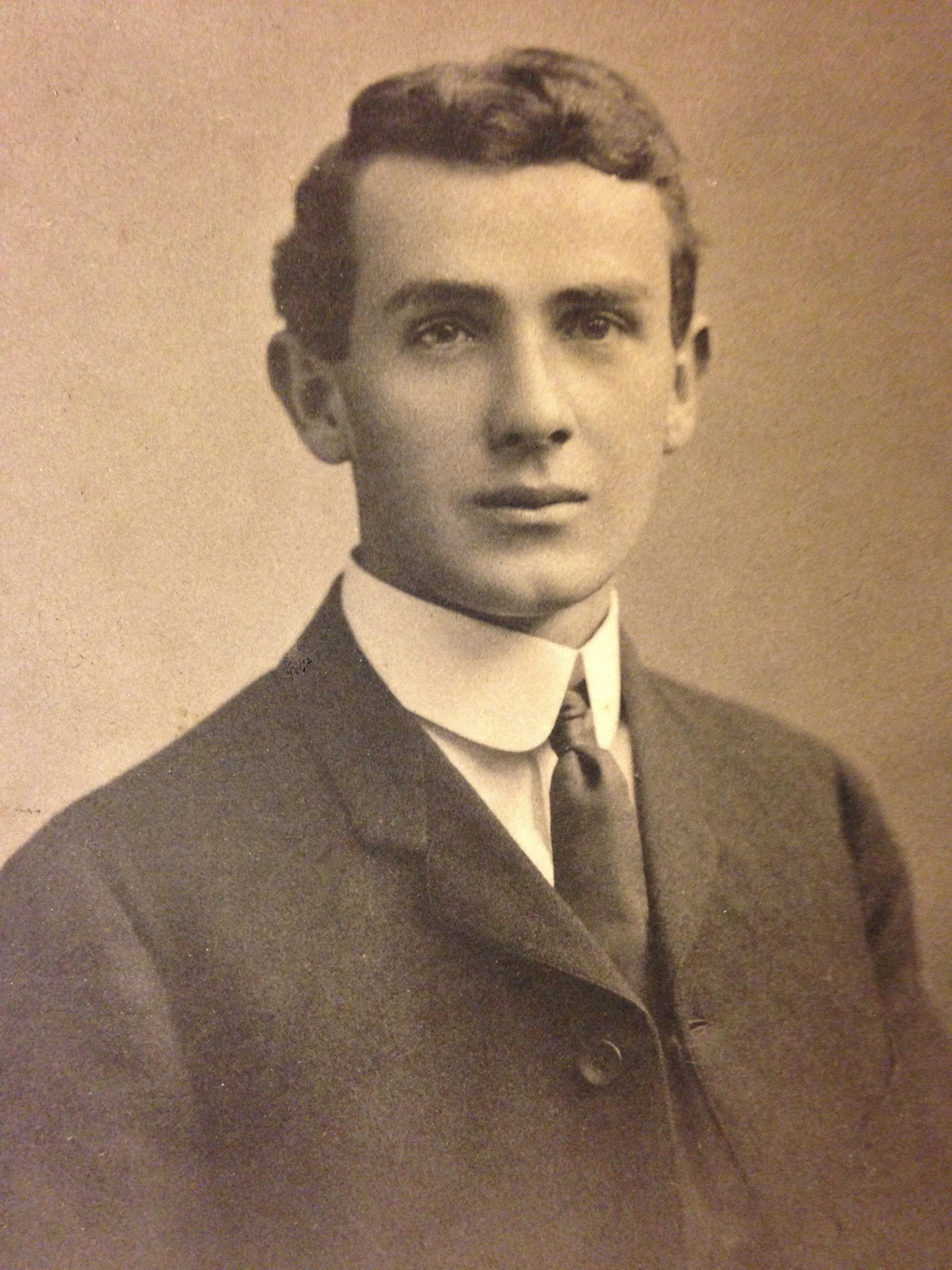
Franklin Haines Price

== Leadership of the Free Library ==
Price served in every department, became department head in 1906, assistant librarian in 1926, and succeeded John Ashhurst III as Chief Librarian in 1934. Under his leadership, the library expanded to include 42 branch locations and a $6,000,000 main building on the Parkway.

=== Technical innovation and collections ===
Price's tenure was characterized by technical modernization and the development of specialized collections.

- Microfilming: He was an early advocate for microphotography, utilizing it to preserve the library's files of Philadelphia newspapers.
- The Fleisher Collection: He was instrumental in developing the Edwin A. Fleisher Music Collection into the world's largest lending library of orchestral scores.
- Service for the Blind: He pioneered library services for the blind, establishing a Braille department that provided books to readers along the Atlantic coast.

== Legacy and honors ==
Price received the Philadelphia Award on March 18, 1952, at the Barclay Hotel, awarded for "an act or service advancing the interests of the community." The Philadelphia Inquirer, in an editorial comment, said: "There can be no question as to Mr. Price's accomplishment redounding to the good of the city. He has helped make the Philadelphia Free Library one of the finest, as well as the third largest, in the country."

== Personal life ==
Price was married to Alice Henrietta Howe, and they resided in Newtown Square. They had three sons, including Alison H. Price. Price retired in November 1951 and died on January 7, 1958, at the age of 75.

== Gallery ==
Family of Franklin Haines Price

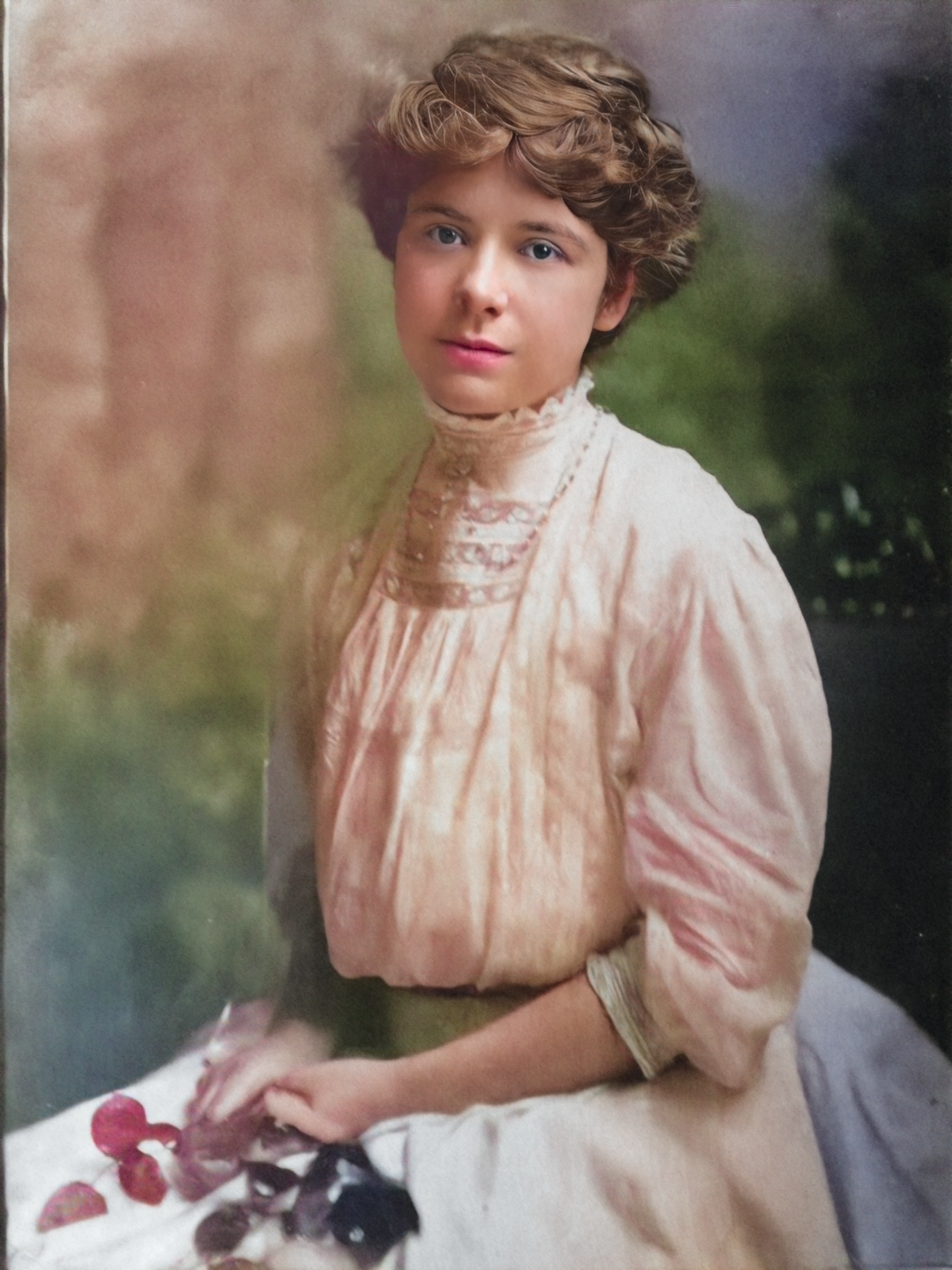
Alice Henrietta Howe

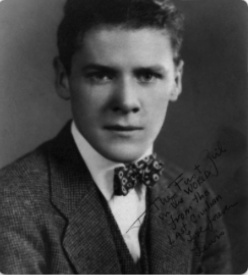
Lewis Hall Price

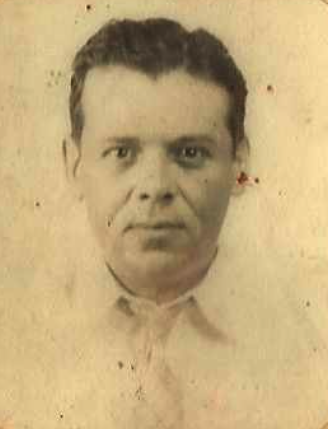
Franklin Haines Price II

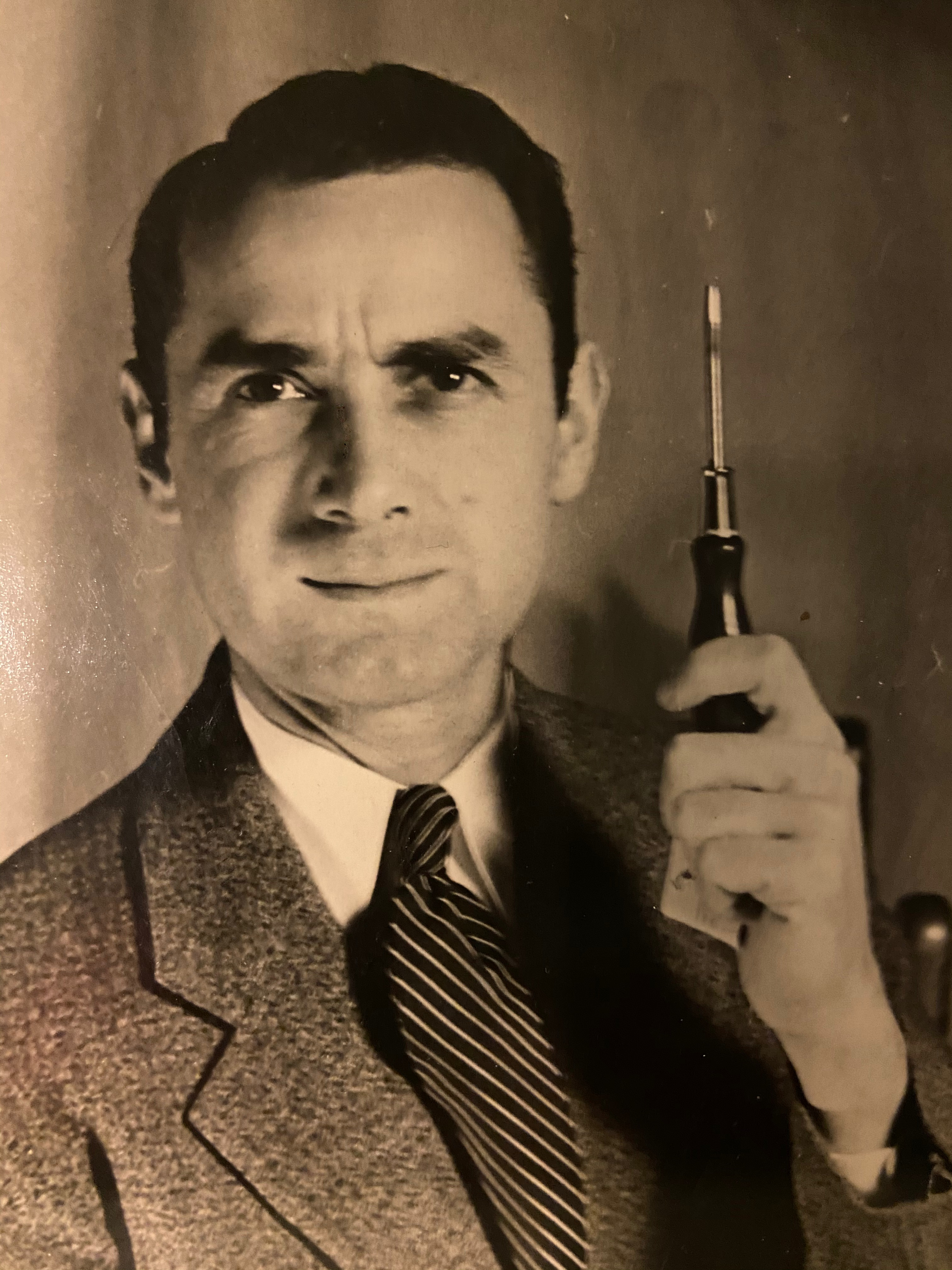
Alison H. Price, M.D.
