= Mel Heifetz =

American businessperson, philanthropist and activist (born 1935)

Mel Heifetz (born November 4, 1935) is a Philadelphia-based real estate developer, philanthropist, and LGBT activist. He is a nationwide supporter of gay rights causes in America. and in 2018, he was awarded the Philadelphia Award.

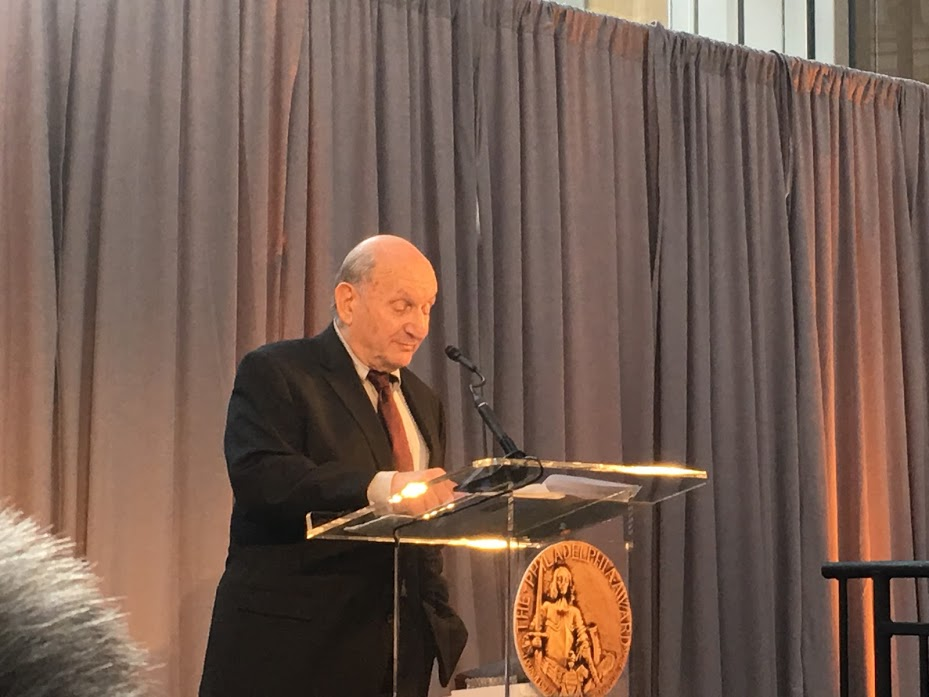
Mel Heifetz accepting his Philadelphia Award

== Early life ==
Heifetz grew up poor in South Philadelphia and had working class Jewish parents. Heifetz's parents were hairdressers and from the age of eight, he began working by cleaning his parents' salon and selling door-to-door with his father. Heifetz enrolled at Temple University to study real estate but left after one year.

Heifetz is a distant relative of violinist Jascha Heifetz.

== Career and activism ==
Heifetz maintains a relationship with the American Civil Liberties Union (ACLU), whose attorneys successfully defended him in the 1950s when his first business, the Humoresque coffeehouse, was raided by police for welcoming interracial and gay couples. Heifetz's experience with Humoresque and the ACLU marked the beginning of his activism against injustice and abuse.

Heifetz built himself as a businessman and developed real estate, gay bars, and hotels, including the Alexander Inn, Philadelphia's first gay hotel. From 1996 until 2013, Heifetz owned and operated Sisters, Philadelphia's only lesbian bar.

Heifetz made a major donation in 2005, which paid off the mortgage of Philadelphia's William Way LGBT Community Center. In 2015, the William Way LGBT Community Center honored Heifetz with their Humanitarian of the Year Award.

In October 2017, Heifetz donated $16 million to The Philadelphia Foundation’s GLBT Fund of America, with the fund's income annually supporting LGBT groups. The GLBT Fund of America was initially established in 2007 and its money supports civil rights causes, social justice, and health needs through LGBT groups such as The Trevor Project, Attic Youth Center, and GALAEI. Also in 2017, Heifetz became a founding benefactor to the Gloria Casarez Residence, Pennsylvania's first young adult LGBT-friendly permanent supporting housing project.

Through donating $1 million to President Barack Obama's 2012 Presidential reelection campaign and $1 million to Hillary Clinton's 2016 campaign, Heifetz officially became the biggest political donor in Pennsylvania. In his February 2016 Huffington Post piece, Heifetz cites Barack Obama's track record on LGBT rights as a motivating factor for supporting him.

== Awards and recognition ==
In addition to the 2018 Philadelphia Award and the 2015 William Way LGBT Community Center Humanitarian of the Year award, Heifetz was the 2014 recipient of the Delaware Valley Legacy Fund Lifetime Legacy Award and the 2008 Human Rights Campaign Equality Award. The Philadelphia Award was established by Edward William Bok and past winners of the award include businesswoman and philanthropist Leonore Annenberg and architect Louis Kahn.

In September 2019, the Equality Forum and LGBT History Month awarded Heifetz with their Frank Kameny award, named in honor of LGBT civil rights movement leader Frank Kameny. Past recipients of Equality Forum's Frank Kameny award include activist Peter Staley and former Pennsylvania Governor Ed Rendell.
