= Lucy Langdon Wilson =

American educator, ethnographer

- Born: Lucy Langdon Williams; August 18, 1864; St. Albans, Vermont, US
- Died: September 3, 1937 (aged 73); Lake Placid, New York, US
- Education: University of Pennsylvania
- Occupations: Educator and ethnographer
- Spouse: William Powell Wilson (1844–1927)

Lucy Langdon Wilson (1864–1937) was an American educator and ethnographer who became widely known for her models of progressive education and for using laboratory methods to teach natural science to young school children. She was also a published ethnographer.

== Biography ==
Born Lucy Langdon Williams in St. Albans, Vermont, on August 18, 1864, Lucy was an advocate for education from a young age. At ten, she pulled a self-described “stunt” by taking and passing the exam for a teacher's license. She went on to attend Girls High School in Philadelphia and then graduated from the Philadelphia Normal School in 1883 as a teacher.

After graduation, she was appointed head of the biology department at the Normal School, and then became a teacher and principal at the private all-boys Rugby Academy. Then a series of appointments followed: math teacher at Girls High; and founder and principal of the city’s first evening high school (for working students); and of the War Emergency High School, a forerunner of today’s summer schools.

At the University of Pennsylvania, she earned her doctorate and followed that degree with additional studies at several institutions, including Harvard and Woods Hole Marine Biological Laboratory. She also researched teaching methods in Europe and South America. In 1893, she married William Powell Wilson (1844–1927) a professor of anatomy and physiology at the University of Pennsylvania and founder of the Philadelphia Commercial Museum.

Lucy Wilson set up a scholarship fund "to enable low-income students to complete high school, providing money, food, medical and dental care, and other assistance to impoverished students and their families."

=== Ethnographic geographer ===
In the first edition of the biographical dictionary American Men of Science, Wilson listed herself as a biologist, but in the second through fifth editions, she called herself as an anthropologist and geographer. She traveled widely pursuing her love of anthropology and during three summers, 1915–1917, Wilson conducted a series of excavations in the American Southwest in the Native American Otowi community located on the Pajarito Plateau of north-central New Mexico. Her team found numerous artifacts and human remains. She also took that opportunity to gather ethnographic information from the San Ildefonso Pueblo nearby. She hoped to link the prehistoric remains found in the area with Native Americans living nearby. She used her findings to create an exhibit that was shown at the Philadelphia Commercial Museum to inform public visitors about the "modern and ancient Pueblo Indian lifeways."

=== Later years ===
Wilson was the first woman to receive the Philadelphia Award in 1933. She retired as school principal in 1934 and joined Temple University as a lecturer.

She died September 3, 1937, at 73.

== Memberships ==
- Anthropological Association
- American Geographical Society
- American Association for the Advancement of Science

== Selected works ==
- Williams, L. L. (1892). A Too Short Vacation. Lippincott Company
- Wilson, L. L. W. (1898). History Reader for Elementary Schools: Arranged with Special Reference to Holidays. Macmillan Company.
- Wilson, L. L. W. (1899). Nature Study in Elementary Schools: A manual for teachers. Macmillan.
- Wilson, L. L. W. (Ed.). (1906). Handbook of Domestic Science and Household Arts for Use in Elementary Schools: A Manual for Teachers. Macmillan.
- Wilson, L. L. W. (1909). Picture Study in Elementary Schools: A Manual for Teachers. Macmillan.
- Wilson, L. L. W. (1928). The new schools of new Russia. Vanguard Press.
