= Philip H. Sheridan School =

- U.S. National Register of Historic Places
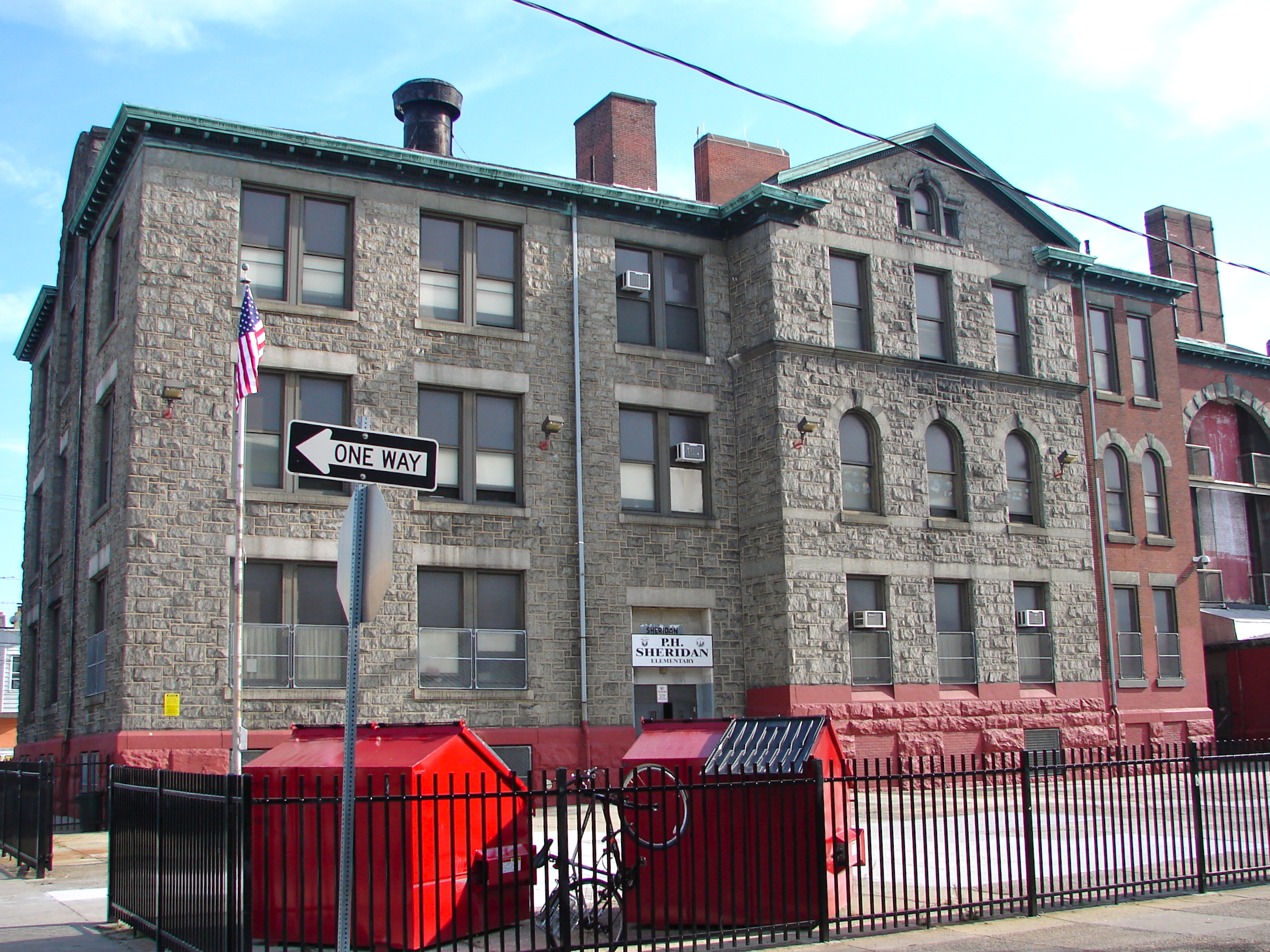
- Philip H. Sheridan School, September 2010

- Location within Philadelphia Location within Pennsylvania Location within the United States
- Location: 800 E. Ontario St., Philadelphia, Pennsylvania
- Coordinates: 39.9996°N 75.1142°W
- Area: 1 acre (0.40 ha)
- Built: 1899–1900
- Built by: H.A. Miller & Son
- Architect: Joseph W. Anschutz
- Architectural style: Colonial Revival
- Website: sheridan.philasd.org
- MPS: Philadelphia Public Schools TR
- NRHP reference No.: 88002322
- Added to NRHP: November 18, 1988

The Philip H. Sheridan Elementary School (now the Gloria Casarez Elementary School) is a historic American elementary school in the Kensington neighborhood of Philadelphia, Pennsylvania. It is part of the School District of Philadelphia.

It was added to the National Register of Historic Places in 1988.

== History and architectural features ==
Built between 1899 and 1900, this historic structure is a three-story, five-bay, stone-and-brick building that was designed in the Colonial Revival style. It features a stone entrance pavilion, Palladian windows, and large arched openings. Three-story wings were added 1902 and 1910.

The school was named for Civil War General Philip Sheridan (1831–1888), one of the most famous Union Army generals of the American Civil War, who later oversaw brutal campaigns against Native Americans.

In 2022, the school name was changed to the Gloria Casarez Elementary School.

Gloria Casarez (December 13, 1971 – October 19, 2014) was an American civil rights leader in Philadelphia. Casarez was born in Philadelphia and grew up in the Kensington neighborhood of North Philadelphia, attending Sheridan Elementary as a child.

== Name change to Gloria Casarez Elementary School ==
In June 2022, it was announced that parents, faculty, students and community members voted to change the name of the school to the Gloria Casarez Elementary School. "We were looking to find a name that represented our school and the goal of inclusion," said Sheridan’s assistant principal Julio Nunez. "It was 46% of the vote in favor of her. There were three other candidates on the ballot. The community voted, selected that name. The majority of the students, by the way, voted and the majority of them selected her [Casarez]. And we're very proud that now we stand with her for inclusion as well, as we move forward," Nunez said.
