= Estelle Richman =

American government official

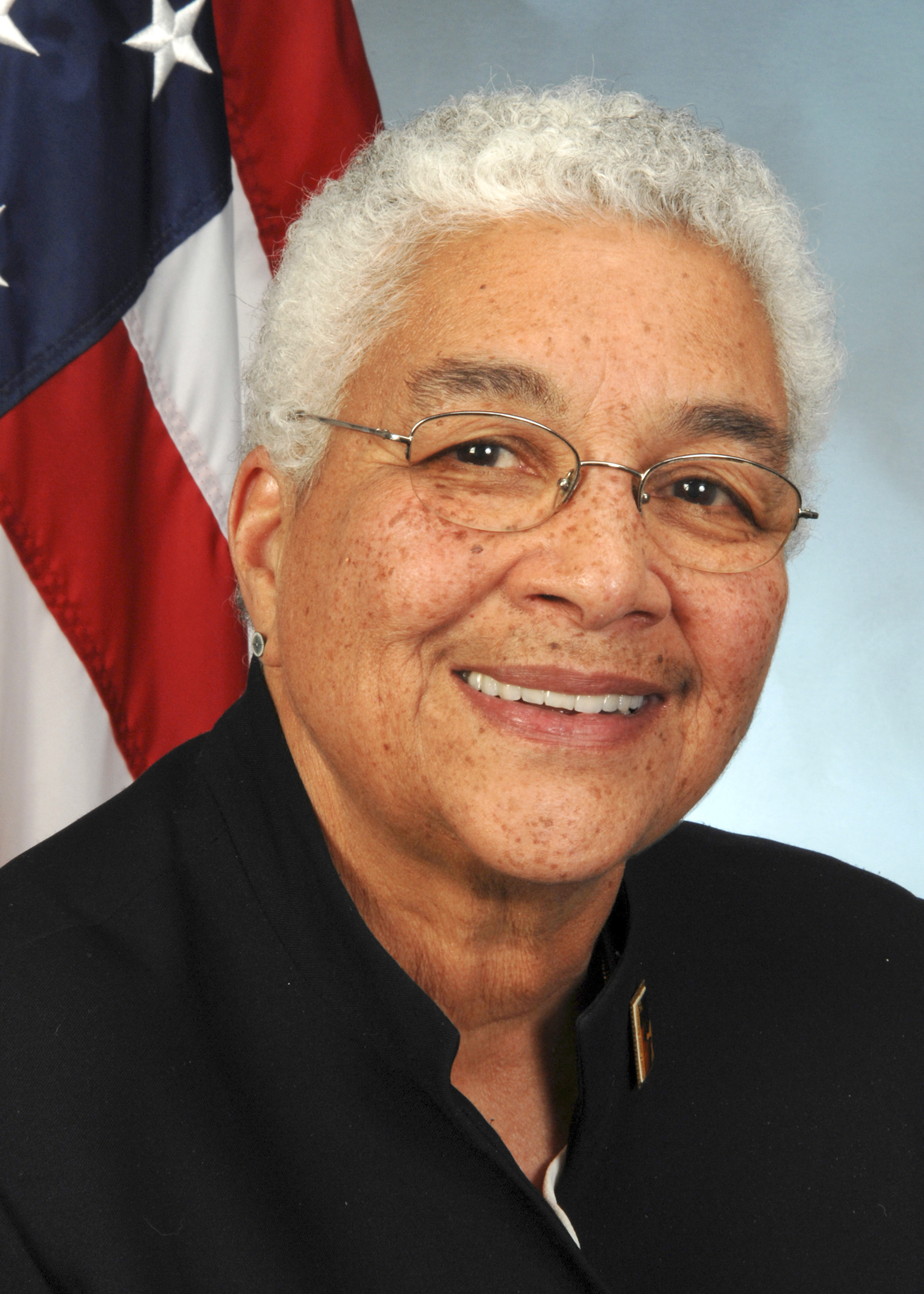

Secretary of the Pennsylvania Department of Public Welfare
- In office 2003–2009
- Governor: Ed Rendell

Personal details
- Education: Case Western Reserve University (BA); Cleveland State University (MA)

Estelle B. Richman is a former American government official, who served as the secretary of the Pennsylvania Department of Public Welfare from 2003 to 2009. She currently works as the chair for the Center for Health Care Strategies.

== Education ==
She earned her undergraduate degree from Case Western Reserve University in 1965 and her master's degree from Cleveland State University in 1978. Richman also holds honorary doctorates from Alvernia University, Drexel University, and Temple University.

== Career ==
As Welfare Secretary, Richman oversaw agency efforts that resulted in an increased percentage of foster children finding permanent homes, a drop in the waiting list for mental-retardation services, improved child-support collection programs, and the creation of the state's first Bureau of Autism. In 1998, she was awarded the Ford Foundation/Good Housekeeping Award for Women in Government.

Prior to her job with the state Public Welfare Department, Richman held several offices in Philadelphia, including Managing Director, Director of Social Services, Commissioner of Public Health, and Deputy Commissioner for Mental Health, Mental Retardation and Substance Abuse Services.

She resigned her post on December 31, 2009 to take a position as chief operating officer of the United States Department of Housing and Urban Development. Richman begin her job on January 4, 2010.

Richman resigned as a senior advisor at HUD in 2016. Pennsylvania Governor Tom Wolf then nominated her to join the Philadelphia School Reform Commission on October 28, 2016. She was confirmed in May 2017, and was serving as the SRC chair when the commission dissolved in 2018.
