= Lucy Wilson (suffragist) =

Lucy Wilson (1834–1891) was a Yorkshire born suffragist, educationalist and campaigner for the rights of women.

== Early life ==
Lucy Wilson was born at Banks Hall, Barnsley, Yorkshire on 25 January 1834. She was the third child and only daughter of Thomas Wilson, a colliery proprietor and a founder of the Yorkshire Union of Mechanic’s Institutes, and his wife Elizabeth. A move to Crimbles House, Leeds followed when Thomas became auditor of the Aire and Calder Navigation Company, and as an educated and cultured man, became engaged in Leeds society as a long time honorary secretary of the Leeds Philosophical and Literary Society. Her brother Edmund Wilson (1838–1914) was an eminent Leeds solicitor and councilor, president of the Leeds Liberal Association, election agent for Gladstone in 1880 and an energetic supporter of education development.

Against this context Lucy Wilson dedicated herself to expanding women’s educational opportunities, particularly through the Leeds Ladies Educational Association and the university extension movement. (At this time women were still barred from University and higher level study.)

== Campaigns ==
Lucy was deeply engaged in a range of issues, including the women’s suffrage movement. As a member of the national executive committee she worked for the amendment of the Married Women’s Property Act to give married women the right to own and manage their own property and earnings (achieved in 1882).

In 1875 she was the main speaker giving evidence in Leeds to a Royal Commission on factory reform, arguing for women’s rights to work on the same basis as men.

Throughout the 1870s and 1880s she was a prominent member of the campaigning Ladies’ National Association for the Repeal of the Contagious Diseases Acts.

Latterly she became associated with the Vigilance Association for the Defence of Personal Rights, of which she was some time Editor.

== Later life ==
Lucy Wilson died from heart disease aged 57, 4 November 1891 at her home in Wandsworth, London.
