= Chris Bartlett (activist) =

American gay activist and educator (born 1966)

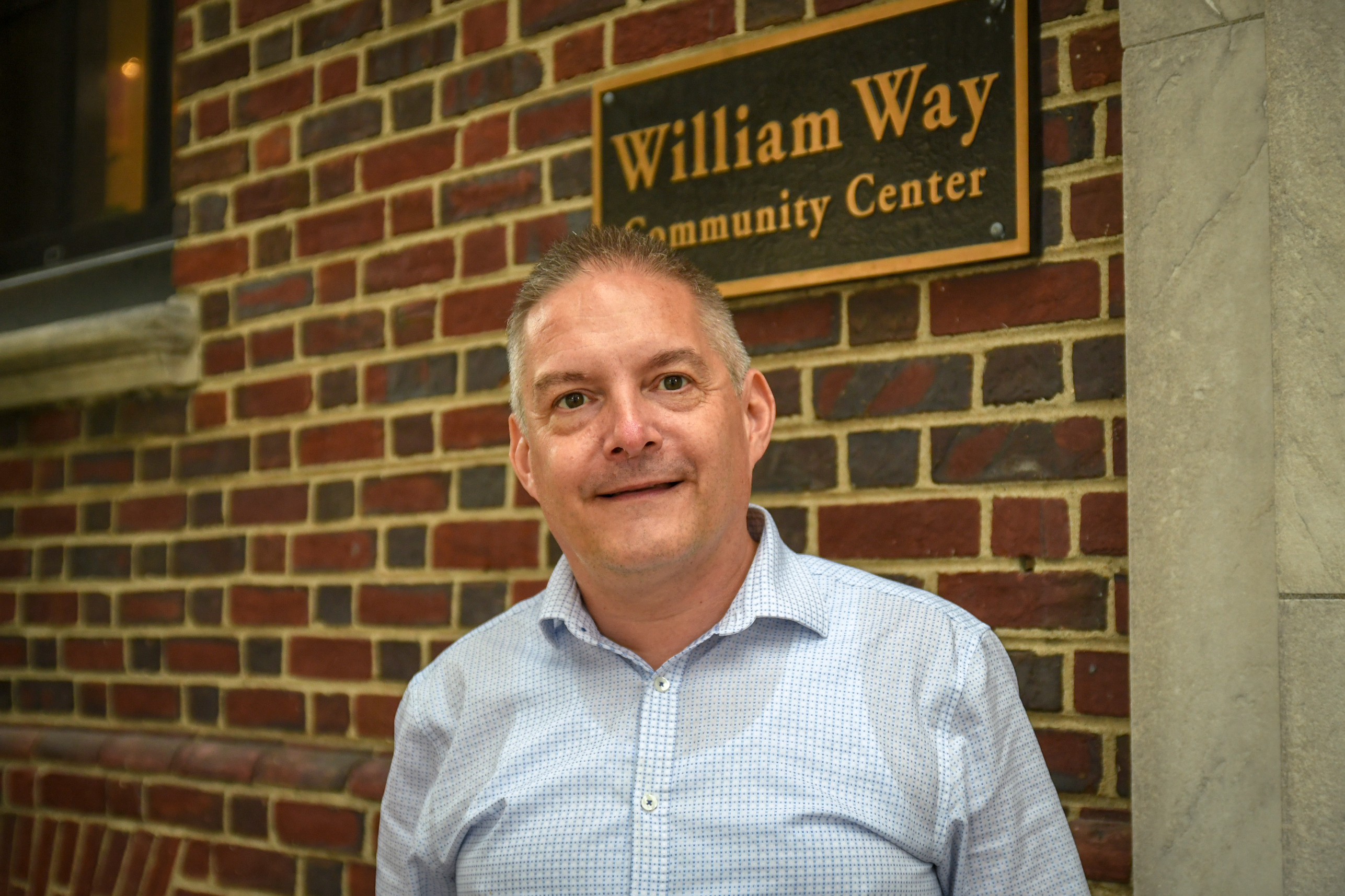
- Bartlett in 2019
- Born: Christopher D. Bartlett; March 29, 1966 (age 60); Philadelphia, Pennsylvania, U.S.
- Education: New College, Oxford; Brown University; Cheltenham High School
- Occupation: Advocate

Chris Bartlett (born March 29, 1966) is an American gay activist, feminist, educator, and researcher from Philadelphia, Pennsylvania, and is the former executive director of the William Way LGBT Community Center. He is currently pursuing a Masters of Library and Information Science at Queens College, City University of New York, with a goal of becoming a community archivist serving LGBTQ communities.

== Life and works ==
Bartlett grew up in Cheltenham Township, Pennsylvania and graduated with a Bachelor of Arts in Classics from Brown University in 1988 and a second Bachelor of Arts in Literae Humaniores from New College, Oxford in 1991.

He was director of the SafeGuards Gay Men's Health Project in Philadelphia from 1991 to 2001, where he developed innovative programs addressing the broader health needs of gay and bisexual men beyond HIV and AIDS.

In his early research, he directed a survey of over 1400 gay and bisexual men in the Philadelphia region in order to assess their risk for HIV, STDs and other health challenges.

In 2003, Bartlett joined forces with gay activist Eric Rofes to create the Gay Men's Health Leadership Academy, a national center for excellence for leadership development of gay and bisexual men and their allies based at the White Crane Institute. The academy hosts biannual retreats on the East Coast (Greenwich, NY) and the West Coast (Guerneville, CA) of the United States, and also works with organizations and governments to strengthen their cadres of gay leadership. Since Rofes' death, the program has been co-facilitated by Kevin Trimell Jones of Philadelphia, PA; Fred Lopez of San Francisco, CA; Scott Pegues of Denver, CO; and Kaijson Noilmar of Seattle, WA.

In 2005, under the leadership of Michael S. Hinson Jr., he directed the LGBT Community Assessment, an assessment of the broad health related needs of LGBT populations in the Philadelphia region. The City of Philadelphia and Philadelphia Foundation subsequently funded an LGBT Youth Assessment, which he also directed.

In 2008, Bartlett received a grant from the Arcus Foundation to create the LGBT Leadership Initiative, a convening of thinkers in the United States about the strategic leadership needs of LGBT communities in the United States. His leadership interests include intergenerational communication and connection, as well as mentorship of younger leaders. In the November, 2008 Instinct Magazine he was named one of the "Leading Men of 2008."

He has created an on-line Wiki to document the deaths of gay men from AIDS between 1981 and the present. The site acts as an on-line AIDS quilt, on which community members and families can document the lives of their friends and loved ones.

Bartlett is also a long-time leader in the Gay Men's Health Movement, both nationally and internationally. He has participated in each of the Gay Men's Health Summits and LGBTI Health Summits as an organizer and presenter, as well as presenting at the Warning Gay Men's Health Summit in Paris, France, in 2005.

His work has shown a continuing interest in participatory democracy, starting with his early participation in ACT UP Philadelphia. His current work focuses on the role of social media, including Twitter, Facebook, and other tools in developing on-line communities that can participate in effective social change. Out of his engagement in social media work, he hosted the TEDx conferences in Philadelphia on November 18, 2010, and November 8, 2011. In 2014, he presented his own TEDxPhilly talk, "How To Make the Neighborhood You Want", which shows the city planning lessons that Philadelphia's Chinatown has for its Gay neighborhood.

He is a member of the Philadelphia circle of Radical Faeries.

During his tenure at the William Way LGBT Community Center, he focused on community building through arts and culture, technological innovation, and intergenerational approaches. He has been a leader in the effort to build housing that is friendly for LGBT seniors. In 2013 under Bartlett's leadership the community center has received grants to fund the nation's first LGBT Jazz Festival (2014) and a city-wide exploration of LGBT history in Philadelphia (2015)

His writings include "Levity and Gravity", in Mattilda Bernstein Sycamore's <Why are Faggots So Afraid of Faggots: Flaming Challenges To Masculinity, Objectification and the Desire to Conform >; and "Choosing Faerie" in Mark Thompson's The Fire in Moonlight: Stories from the Radical Faeries: 1975-2010.
