= Eric Rofes =

American gay activist, educator, and author (1954–2006)

- Born: August 31, 1954; Commack, New York, US
- Died: June 26, 2006 (aged 51); Provincetown, Massachusetts
- Education: Harvard University; University of California, Berkeley
- Occupations: Activist; University professor

Eric Rofes (August 31, 1954 – June 26, 2006) was a gay activist, educator, and author. He was a director of the Los Angeles Gay and Lesbian Center in the 1980s. In 1989, he became executive director of the Shanti Project, a nonprofit AIDS service organization. He was a professor of education at Humboldt State University in Arcata, California, and served on the board of the National Gay and Lesbian Task Force. He wrote or edited twelve books. One of his last projects was co-creating "Gay Men's Health Leadership Academies" to combat what he saw as a "pathology-focused understanding of gay men" in safe-sex education.

== Early life and education ==
Eric Rofes was born on August 31, 1954, to a Jewish family, and grew up in Commack, New York. He graduated from Harvard University and went on to receive a master's degree from the University of California, Berkeley in 1995, and a doctorate in social and cultural studies in 1998.

== Career ==
He was appointed to the White House Conference on the Family in 1980. He became director of the Los Angeles Gay and Lesbian Center in the 1980s.

In 1989, he became executive director of the Shanti Project, a nonprofit AIDS service organization in San Francisco. He resigned in 1993, following an audit that questioned how the group had spent federal funds.

In 1998, while doing his PhD at UC Berkeley, Rofes wrote Dry Bones Breathe: Gay Men Creating Post-AIDS Identities and Cultures, in which he argued that the AIDS crisis had passed and gay men needed to free themselves from the sense of emergency and victimhood. A review in The Nation described Dry Bones Breathe as "perhaps the most important book about gay male culture and community of the past decade." However, the book has also been castigated for only limning the experiences of 'middle-class, urban, white, gay men' instead of being more societally inclusive.

He was a professor of education at Humboldt State University in Arcata, California, and served on the board of the National Gay and Lesbian Task Force and White Crane Institute.

One of the last projects he worked on was the creation, with Chris Bartlett, of a series of "Gay Men's Health Leadership Academies" to combat what he saw as a "pathology-focused understanding of gay men" in safe-sex education. These workshops have persisted as a continuation of his legacy.

== Death ==
He was living in Provincetown, Massachusetts, working on his 13th book when he died of a heart attack.

== Legacy ==
Humboldt State established the Eric Rofes Center after his death as a new program in honor of his legacy and to continue his work in queer-feminist activism. The Eric Rofes Multicultural Queer Resource center is a student-run, student-funded initiative that provides programming and resources for Humboldt State University's LGBTQIA community. It is located in Nelson Hall West, Room 202 on campus.

In June 2019, Rofes was one of the inaugural fifty American “pioneers, trailblazers, and heroes” inducted on the National LGBTQ Wall of Honor within the Stonewall National Monument (SNM) in New York City’s Stonewall Inn. The SNM is the first U.S. national monument dedicated to LGBTQ rights and history, and the wall’s unveiling was timed to take place during the 50th anniversary of the Stonewall riots.

== Bibliography ==
- The Kids' Book of Divorce (1983)
- I Thought People Like That Killed Themselves: Lesbians, Gay Men and Suicide (1983)
- The Kids' Book About Parents (1983)
- Socrates, Plato, & Guys Like Me: Confessions of a Gay Schoolteacher (1985)
- Gay Life (1986)
- "Living as All of Who I Am: Being Jewish in the Lesbian/Gay Community", in Twice Blessed: On Being Lesbian, Gay, and Jewish ed. Balka & Rose (1989)
- Living with AIDS on Long Island (1989)
- Reviving the Tribe: Regenerating Gay Men's Sexuality and Culture in the Ongoing Epidemic (1996)
- The Kids' Book About Death and Dying (1997)
- Opposite Sex (1998)
- Dry Bones Breathe: Gay Men Creating Post-AIDS Identities and Cultures (1998)
- Youth and Sexualities (2004)
- The Emancipatory Promise of Charter Schools (2004)
- A Radical Rethinking of Sexuality & Schooling (2005)
- Thriving (with an introduction by Chris Bartlett & Tony Valenzuela) (Posthumous) (PDF of Thriving)
