= Mazzoni Center =

Health care provider in Philadelphia, Pennsylvania, US

- Formation: 1979; 47 years ago
- Tax ID no.: 23-2176338
- Legal status: 501(c)(3) organization
- Headquarters: Philadelphia, Pennsylvania
- CEO: Sultan Shakir
- Website: mazzonicenter.org
- Formerly called: Lavender Health Project; Philadelphia Community Health Alternatives (PCHA)

Mazzoni Center is a 501(c)(3) nonprofit health care provider in Philadelphia, Pennsylvania, that serves the LGBTQ community.

== About ==
=== Mission ===
To provide quality comprehensive health and wellness services in an LGBTQ-focused environment, while preserving the dignity and improving the quality of life of the individuals we serve.

=== History ===
Founded in 1979, the Mazzoni Center was originally known as the Lavender Health Project, a volunteer health subcommittee at the Gay Community Center (now known as the William Way LGBT Community Center).

The group was formed just two years before the HIV/AIDS epidemic was first recognized. Its areas of original focus included clinical services for gay men & lesbians, health education, and advocacy work; however, responding to the AIDS epidemic became the health agency's primary concern during the 80's and early 90's.

In 1981, when the group became incorporated, it changed its name to the Philadelphia Community Health Alternatives (PCHA). The PCHA quickly organized the Philadelphia AIDS Task Force (PATF), which became the first AIDS service organization in Pennsylvania.

In 2003, the organization renamed itself to the Mazzoni Center, after Dr. Peter Mazzoni, a volunteer physician and board member. Dr. Mazzoni had served as the clinic's medical director, was an openly gay and HIV-positive physician, and died in 1990 at age 31.

Today, the Mazzoni Center is the oldest HIV service provider in the state.

=== Services ===
- Medical Care: Services focus on LGBT needs. The Mazzoni Center has partnered with Thomas Jefferson University’s Department of Family and Community Medicine to provide healthcare at a clinic located near the hospital.
- HIV and STD Testing: The Mazzoni Center offers free, confidential HIV and sexually transmitted infection screenings at the Washington West Project in Center City Philadelphia.
- HIV Care: Medical case management is offered for clients who need help obtaining medical care, insurance, public benefits, food, housing, mental health treatment, substance abuse treatment, and other resources.
- Health Education: Services from the Prevention/Education Department offer education, outreach, and counseling services.
- Legal Issues: Legal assistance is offered for low-income LGBT individuals facing discrimination, harassment, family issues, writing wills, and more.
- Counseling & Behavioral Health Support Groups: Mental health and substance abuse treatment programs are available for individuals, couples and families.

=== Detransitioning issues ===
In August 2017, the Mazzoni Center cancelled a Trans Health Conference panel discussion on detransitioning. The conference organizers said, "When a topic becomes controversial, such as this one has turned on social media, there is a duty to make sure that the debate does not get out of control at the conference itself. After several days of considerations and reviewing feedback, the planning committee voted that the workshops, while valid, cannot be presented at the conference as planned".

== See also ==
- List of transgender-related topics
- List of LGBT-related organizations
- Transitioning (transgender)
- Transgender health care
- Transgender publications
