= William Way LGBT Community Center =

Nonprofit LGBTQ center in Philadelphia, Pennsylvania

Coordinates: 39.94737°N 75.16334°W

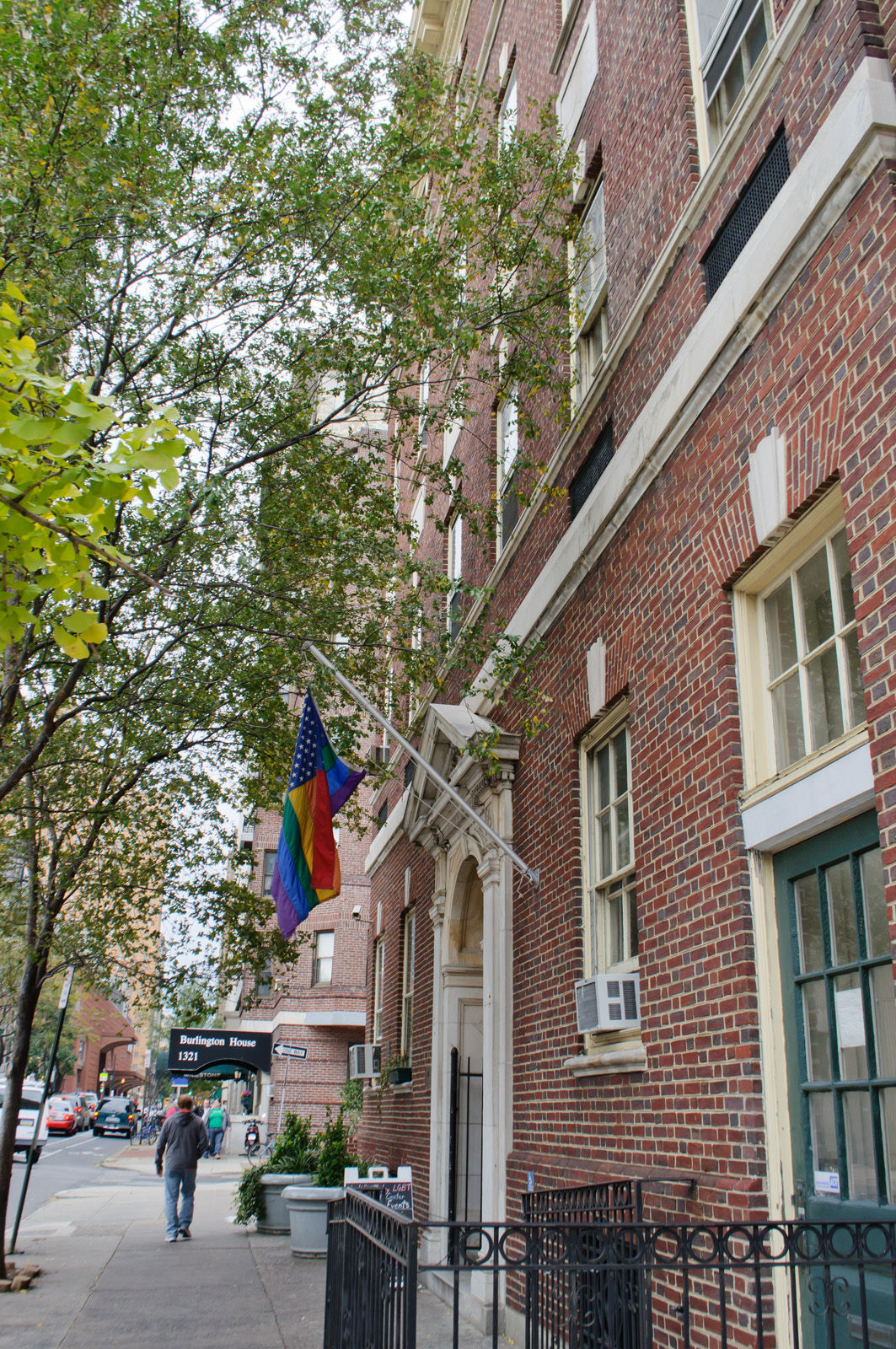
- Founded: 1975
- Type: LGBT Community Center
- Location: 1315 Spruce Street. Philadelphia, Pennsylvania United States
- Region served: Philadelphia metropolitan area
- Key people: Board Co-Chairs, Dave Huting and Laura Ryan; Executive Director, Darius McLean
- Website: http://www.waygay.org

The William Way LGBT Community Center is a nonprofit organization serving the lesbian, gay, bisexual and transgender population of Philadelphia, Pennsylvania and nearby communities, located at 1315 Spruce Street in Philadelphia in the Gayborhood.

The Center's Executive Director is Darius McLean, who had served as William Way's Chief Operating Officer before stepping into his new role. Chris Bartlett was the center's executive director starting in 2010, before stepping down, effective June 30, 2025.

== History ==
This community center was founded in 1975 as the Gay Community Center of Philadelphia. Organizers purchased its current building at 1315 Spruce Street in 1997; the center has owned it since local businessman Mel Heifetz paid off its mortgage in 2005.

=== Art and notable architectural features ===
The western wall of the community center features Ann Northrup's block-long mural, "Pride and Progress", with images of LGBT citizens who have contributed to Philadelphia's cultural and intellectual life throughout history.

== Programs and services ==
The center's programs include an extensive library, and programs in peer counseling, senior services, education, and arts and culture. The center also offers numerous twelve-step meetings throughout the day and night, and opened the Arcila-Adams Trans Resource Center in 2019 to centralize resources for trans people in Philadelphia.

In 2021, the center collaborated with HIV/AIDS healthcare provider Philadelphia FIGHT to provide COVID-19 vaccines to LGBTQ people in Philadelphia.

The center houses the John J. Wilcox, Jr. Archives, which collects and preserves local and regional LGBT documents and artifacts. The archive is one of the most important collections of LGBTQ documents and artifacts in the United States. Along with researchers from the ONE Archives in Los Angeles, archivists from the John J. Wilcox, Jr. Archives have been searching for unidentified men photographed at a gay wedding held in 1957. The search, which began in 2013 and is still ongoing, was covered in both LGBT and mainstream press.

== See also ==
- List of LGBT community centers
