= 2006 dismissal of U.S. attorneys timeline =

A detailed chronology of events in the dismissal of U.S. attorneys controversy.

== 2001 and 2002 ==
Dates that attorneys were sworn in under a presidential nomination and United States Senate confirmation (some may have already been serving under interim appointment, in anticipation of senate confirmation).

1. October 11, 2001: Todd Graves (Western Missouri)
2. October 18, 2001: David Iglesias (New Mexico)
3. October 24, 2001: John McKay (Western Washington)
4. November 2, 2001: Margaret Chiara (Western Michigan)
5. November 2, 2001: Daniel Bogden (Nevada)
6. November 14, 2001: Paul Charlton (Arizona)
7. January 9, 2002: H.E. "Bud" Cummins III (Eastern Arkansas)
8. August 2, 2002: Kevin Ryan (Northern California)
9. November 8, 2002: Carol Lam (Southern California)

== 2003 ==
- September 2003: The Department of Justice's Office of Legal Counsel completes a memorandum exploring the laws and the limit to the term for an interim U.S. Attorney that had not received Senate confirmation. The memorandum came to the conclusion that it was possible for an interim appointee to be in office for as long as 330 days, under two different vacancy and appointment laws and procedures. The memorandum was completed in September 2003.

== 2004 ==
=== March 2004 ===
- March 2004: Confrontation over the Bush administration's warrantless wiretap program undermines the trust of senior Department of Justice (DOJ) staff in White House officials, and promotes turnover of senior DOJ officers over the next two years. In early March, Deputy Attorney General James Comey is advised by Jack Goldsmith (the then recently appointed head of the DOJ Office of Legal Counsel) that there is no legal basis authorizing the form of the program as it was then structured and operated. Comey briefs John Ashcroft, who hours later falls critically ill with pancreatitis, and delegates operational authority as Attorney General to Comey. On March 10, 2004, then-White House Counsel Alberto Gonzales and Andrew Card, White House chief of staff visited Ashcroft at the hospital, where Ashcroft declined again to re-approve the secret program, while indicating that Comey is the presently acting Attorney General. Comey reaffirmed his rejection of the program as acting attorney general. Comey and as many as 30 senior DOJ staff were ready to resign over the issue if the President continued to carry out the program in unmodified form, and in protest over the attempt to sidestep Comey and obtain approval from the critically ill Ashcroft. The program is modified via negotiations between the President's staff and senior DOJ staff over the next several weeks.

=== June 2004 ===
- June 17, 2004: John Ashcroft announces the resignation of Jack Goldsmith, Assistant Attorney General for the Office of Legal Counsel, effective July 30, 2004. Goldsmith had been nominated by Bush to the position in April 2003; he had previously served as Special Counsel to the General Counsel of the Department of Defense.

=== November 2004 ===
- November 2, 2004: On the day of the presidential election, John Ashcroft submits his resignation from the post of Attorney General, marking the conclusion of a tumultuous term in office. The White House announces acceptance of the resignation a week later, on November 9, 2004, along with that of Commerce Secretary Donald L. Evans. Ashcroft states in the resignation his willingness to serve until a successor is nominated and confirmed. He is the first cabinet-level officer to resign from the George W. Bush administration. It was reported that the White House had indicated to Ashcroft that his resignation would be expected. Ashcroft would remain in office until Alberto Gonzales took the oath of office on February 3, 2005, after his confirmation by the Senate.

== 2005 ==
=== January 2005 ===
- January 2005: Deputy White House Chief of Staff Karl Rove asked Deputy Counsel David Leitch "how we planned to proceed regarding U.S. attorneys, whether we were going to allow all to stay, request resignations from all and accept only some of them, or selectively replace them, etc." In reply, Department of Justice counsel to Attorney General John Ashcroft, Kyle Sampson wrote that it would be "weird to ask them to leave before completing at least a 4-year term" and that "we would like to replace 15–20 percent of the current U.S. Attorneys–the underperforming ones. (This is a rough guess; we might want to consider doing performance evaluations after Judge comes on board.) The vast majority of U.S. Attorneys, 80–85 percent, I would guess, are doing a great job, are loyal Bushies, etc."

=== February 2005 ===
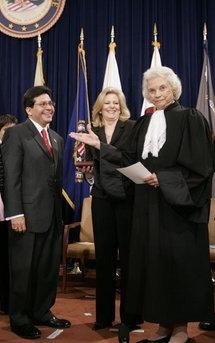
Gonzales after the swearing-in ceremony

- February 3, 2005: Gonzales is confirmed as the 80th United States Attorney General. He takes the oath of office the same day.
- February 15, 2005: Kyle Sampson is promoted, adding the new title of Deputy Chief of Staff to his continuing title, Counselor to the Attorney General.

=== March 2005 ===
- March 1, 2005: Attorney General Gonzales signed a confidential order, not published in the Federal Register, that formally delegated his authority to senior DOJ staff, White House liaison and public affairs officer Monica Goodling and deputy chief of staff for the Attorney General Kyle Sampson to hire and dismiss political appointees.
- March: "Sampson, chief of staff to Attorney General Alberto R. Gonzales, came up with a checklist. He rated each of the U.S. attorneys with criteria that appeared to value political allegiance as much as job performance. He recommended retaining 'strong U.S. Attorneys who have ... exhibited loyalty to the President and Attorney General.' He suggested 'removing weak U.S. Attorneys who have ... chafed against Administration initiatives'".

=== August 2005 ===
- August 8, 2005: the Los Angeles Times reported that the day after a grand jury subpoena of records connected to Jack Abramoff "U.S. Attorney Frederick A. Black, who had launched the investigation, was demoted. A White House news release announced that Bush was replacing Black." His replacement, Leonardo Rapadas, recommended for the job by the Guam Republican Party, was confirmed without any debate. The investigation of Abramoff in Guam ended when "Rapadas recused himself from the public corruption case involving [Carl] Gutierrez" because "the new U.S. attorney was a cousin of 'one of the main targets'", according to a confidential memo to Justice Department officials."

== 2006 ==
=== January 2006 ===
- January 2006: Sampson wrote in January 2006 to White House Counsel Harriet Miers that he recommended that the Department of Justice and the Office of the Counsel to the President work together to seek the replacement of a limited number of U.S. attorneys, as well as that by limiting the number of attorneys "targeted for removal and replacement" it would "mitigat[e] the shock to the system that would result from an across-the-board firing."
- January 2006: Western Missouri U.S. Attorney Todd Graves receives a phone call from the Executive Office for United States Attorneys requesting that he submit his resignation.
- January 9, 2006: Sampson recommends to Miers and Kelley that their office "work quietly with targeted U.S. attorneys to encourage them to leave government service voluntarily."

=== February 2006 ===
- February 12, 2006: Monica Goodling sent a spreadsheet of each U.S. Attorney's political activities and memberships in conservative political groups, in an email to senior administration officials, with the comment "This is the chart that the AG requested".
- Late February 2006: The White House and Senate had a minor dispute over the nomination of the U.S. Attorney to Utah. The White House favored Kyle Sampson for the position, while Senator Hatch (R-Utah) favored Brett Tolman. Tolman was eventually nominated by President Bush and confirmed by the Senate. Both Sampson and Tolman originate from Utah.

=== March 2006 ===
- March 8, 2006: Foggo resigns as executive director of the CIA.
- March 9, 2006: Bush signs the USA PATRIOT Act Improvement and Reauthorization Act of 2005 into law. The act amended the law for the interim appointment of U.S. attorneys by deleting two provisions: (a) the 120-day maximum term for the Attorney General's interim appointees; (b) the subsequent interim appointment authority of Federal District Courts. With the revision, an interim appointee can potentially serve indefinitely (though still removable by the President), if the President declines to nominate a U.S. Attorney for a vacancy, or the Senate either fails to act on a Presidential nomination, or rejects a nominee different from the interim appointee. The change was written into the bill by Republican Senator Arlen Specter from Pennsylvania when the bill was modified in joint conference committee, reconciling the Senate and House versions of the bill.
- March 10, 2006: Western Missouri U.S. Attorney Todd Graves submits his resignation, effective March 24, 2006, after being ordered to do so two months previously.
- March 24, 2006: Bradley Schlozman's first day in office for the Western Missouri District. Schlozman is the first interim attorney appointed under the revised law; he has no term limit.

=== May 2006 ===
- May 10, 2006: The U.S. Attorney's office in San Diego notifies the Justice Department that search warrants are to be executed for Foggo, the No. 3 official in the CIA.
- May 11, 2006: Sampson tells White House Deputy Counsel William Kelley: "The real problem we have right now with Carol Lam ... leads me to conclude that we should have someone ready to be nominated on 11/18, the day her 4-year term expires."
- May 12, 2006: The FBI raids Foggo's house and office.

=== June 2006 ===
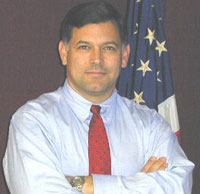
Bud Cummins, who was asked to resign in June 2006

- June 2006: U.S. Attorney Bud Cummins of Arkansas is informed that his resignation will be requested.

=== September 2006 ===
- September 13, 2006: Sampson sends a preliminary plan to push out attorneys to Miers. The plan mentions Bud Cummins of Arkansas as an attorney already in the process of being pushed out. Sampson states in the email: "I am only in favor of executing on a plan to push some USAs out if we are ready and willing to put in the time necessary to select candidates and get them appointed–it will be counterproductive to DOJ operations if we push USAs out and then don't have replacements ready to roll immediately."
- September 17, 2006: Via email, Miers responds to Sampson's preliminary plan to push out attorneys: "I have not forgotten I need to follow up on the info, but things have been crazy. Will be back in touch!"
- September 17, 2006: Kyle Sampson, Alberto Gonzales's chief of staff, in a memo to Harriet Miers, strongly urged using the revision to the law to bypass congressional confirmation. "I am only in favor of executing on a plan to push some USAs out if we really are ready and willing to put in the time necessary to select candidates and get them appointed ... It will be counterproductive to DOJ operations if we push USAs out and then don't have replacements ready to roll immediately ... I strongly recommend that as a matter of administration, we utilize the new statutory provisions that authorize the AG to make USA appointments ... [By avoiding Senate confirmation] we can give far less deference to home state senators and thereby get 1.) our preferred person appointed and 2.) do it far faster and more efficiently at less political costs to the White House."
- September 22, 2006: Gonzales appoints Jeffrey A. Taylor as interim U.S. Attorney for the District of Columbia under these USA PATRIOT Act provisions. He was sworn in without Senate confirmation seven days later.
- September 22, 2006: After McKay complains publicly about budget restrictions, Elston writes, "Even when he is in Ireland he causes problems! He needs to stop writing letters."

=== October 2006 ===
- October 2006: Bush tells Gonzales that he had received complaints that some of the U.S. attorneys had not pursued certain voter-fraud investigations. These complaints came from Republican officials, who demanded fraud investigations into a number of Democratic campaigns. Released documents also showed that, "in one case, officials were eager to free up the prosecutor's slot in Little Rock, Ark., so it could be filled by Timothy Griffin, a GOP operative close to White House political guru Karl Rove — at all costs."
- October 16, 2006: Republican U.S. Representative Heather Wilson of New Mexico calls Iglesias to ask about ongoing criminal investigations against Democrats. Approximately two weeks later, Senator Pete Domenici calls Iglesias at home to inquire about the same topic.
- October: According to Newsweek, at some time in October 2006 "Kyle Sampson, Gonzales's chief of staff, developed the list of eight prosecutors to be fired with input from the White House."

=== November 2006 ===
- November 15, 2006: Sampson proposes a revised plan to fire and replace seven U.S. attorneys; he sends it to White House Counsel Miers.
- November 21, 2006: Sampson sends an email to an assistant in the Attorney General's office, scheduling a meeting in Gonzales's conference room with senior Justice Department advisors to discuss "U.S. Attorney Appointments". Those asked to be scheduled in the meeting included Gonzales, Sampson, Goodling, Deputy Attorney General Paul McNulty, Associated Deputy Attorney General William Moschella, Michael Elston and Michael Battle.
- November 27, 2006: Released DOJ documents show that Gonzales "attended an hour-long meeting [with senior advisors] at which, aides said, he approved a detailed plan for executing the purge."

=== December 2006 ===
- December 2, 2006: Sampson writes to Elston that the Justice Department was "[s]till waiting for green light from White House" with regards to the firing.
- December 4, 2006: Deputy White House Counsel William K. Kelley responds to Sampson's December 2 inquiry stating that "We're a go for the U.S. Atty plan ... [the White House office of legislative affairs], political, communications have signed off and acknowledged that we have to be committed to following through once the pressure comes."
- December 5, 2006: McNulty emails Sampson with last-minute hesitancy about the firings: "I'm still a little skittish about Bogden. He has been with DOJ since 1990 and, at age 50, has never had a job outside of government. My guess is that he was hoping to ride this out well into '09 or beyond. I'll admit I have not looked at his district's performance. Sorry to be raising this again/now; it was just on my mind last night and this morning."
- December 7, 2006: Justice Department official Michael Battle informs seven U.S. attorneys that they were being dismissed. The following seven attorneys were dismissed: Iglesias, Lam, Bogden, Charlton, McKay, Ryan, Chiara.
- December 14, 2006: U.S. Attorney John McKay of the State of Washington announces his resignation, effective January 25.
- December 15, 2006: The Department of Justice announces that Tim Griffin has been appointed to be interim U.S. Attorney for the Eastern District of Arkansas, with the appointment effective on December 20, 2006. Although Griffin has been working as a special assistant in the Eastern Arkansas office since September, Cummins is caught by surprise and learns of the announcement while hiking with his son, via his cell phone. Cummins submits his resignation effective December 20, 2006.
- December 19, 2006: U.S. Attorney Paul Charlton of Arizona announces his resignation; an assistant announces the resignation of Iglesias.
- December 20, 2006: U.S. Attorney Bud Cummins of Arkansas leaves office and is replaced by Tim Griffin, a former aide to Karl Rove.

Dismissed U.S. attorneys summary
Dismissed attorney		Effective date of resignation	Federal district	Replacement^{1}
Dismissed December 7, 2006
1.	David Iglesias	Dec 19, 2006	New Mexico	Larry Gomez
2.	Kevin V. Ryan	Jan 16, 2007	Northern California	Scott Schools
3.	John McKay	Jan 26, 2007	Western Washington	Jeffrey C. Sullivan
4.	Paul K. Charlton	Jan 31, 2007	Arizona	Daniel G. Knauss
5.	Carol Lam	Feb 15, 2007	Southern California	Karen Hewitt
6.	Daniel Bogden	Feb 28, 2007	Nevada	Steven Myhre
7.	Margaret Chiara	Mar 16, 2007	Western Michigan	Russell C. Stoddard
Others dismissed in 2006
1.	Todd Graves	Mar 24, 2006^{2}	Western Missouri	Bradley Schlozman^{6}
2.	Bud Cummins	Dec 20, 2006^{3}	Eastern Arkansas	Tim Griffin^{5}
Dismissed in 2005
1.	Thomas M. DiBiagio	Jan 2, 2005^{4}	Maryland	Allen F. Loucks
2.	Kasey Warner	Jul 2005^{4}	Southern W. Virginia	Charles T. Miller
^{1}Source: Department of Justice, U.S. Attorneys Offices^{2}Informed of dismissal January 2006.^{3}Informed of dismissal June 2006.^{4}Date resignation requested by the Department of Justice is unknown.^{5}Subsequently submitted resignation on May 30, 2007, effective June 1, 2007.^{6}Subsequently returned to positions at the Department of Justice in Washington

== 2007 ==
=== January 2007 ===
- January 4, 2007: The Senate convened for the 110th U.S. Congress with its new Democratic majority.
- January 4, 2007: Harriet Miers, Legal Counsel to the President announces her resignation, effective January 31, 2007. Her departure comes at the urging of Chief of Staff Joshua Bolten, who succeeds in persuading the President that the Office of Legal Counsel must be increased in size and have a supervisor that is experienced in fending off expected congressional inquiries and subpoenas.
- January 9, 2007: In a letter to Gonzales on January 9, 2007, Senators Feinstein (D-California) and Leahy (D-Vermont; Chair) of the Senate Judiciary Committee expressed concern that the confirmation process for U.S. attorneys would be bypassed.
- January 9, 2007: Fred Fielding is announced as the future Counsel to the President, replacing the departing Miers.
- January 11, 2007: Democratic Senators including Senator Mark Pryor (D-Arkansas), filed a bill entitled the Preserving United States Attorney Independence Act of 2007, "to prevent circumvention of the Senate's constitutional prerogative to confirm U.S. Attorneys." Feinstein issued a press release about that process and bill, S. 214; a parallel bill was introduced in the House as H.R. 580.
- January 16, 2007: U.S. Attorney Kevin Ryan of San Francisco announces his resignation. Two days later McNulty aide Elston writes, "Kevin Ryan's FAUSA, Eumi Choi, just called to let us know that Kevin is not returning calls from Sen. Feinstein or Carol Lam and doing his best to stay out of this. He wanted us to know that he's still a 'company man.' I gave her my talkers for McKay and Charlton and asked her to convey them to Kevin."
- January 18, 2007: Gonzales testified before the Senate Judiciary Committee. He assured it that he did not intend to bypass the confirmation process and denied the firings were politically motivated. Attorney General Gonzales admits that several U.S. attorneys have been asked to resign: "No, I don't deny that. What I'm saying is–but that happens during every administration during different periods for different reasons. And so the fact that that's happened, quite frankly, some people should view that as a sign of good management. What we do is we make an evaluation about the performance of individuals, and I have a responsibility to the people in your district that we have the best possible people in these positions."
- January 18, 2007: U.S. Attorney Daniel Bogden of Nevada announces his resignation, effective February 28.
- January 18, 2007: In an opinion piece for the Las Vegas Review-Journal, Jane Ann Morrison reported that "A GOP source [had indicated] that the decision to remove U.S. attorneys, primarily in the West, was part of a plan to 'give somebody else that experience' to build up the back bench of Republicans by giving them high-profile jobs."
- January 19, 2007: Bud Cummins, the recently dismissed Eastern Arkansas U.S. Attorney, contacts senior DOJ officials to warn them of serious "misleading statements" about the U.S. Attorney firings, especially that Gonzales had said that the Justice Department would never utilize the PATRIOT Act to install new U.S. attorneys by circumventing the Senate confirmation process. Cummins believed that Gonzales's testimony was incorrect because both Griffin and a senior Justice Department official had told him that it was indeed the plan to avoid a Senate confirmation for Griffin.
- January 26, 2007: Marisa Taylor, writing for McClatchy Newspapers, noted that, "The newly appointed U.S. attorneys all have impressive legal credentials, but most of them have few, if any, ties to the communities they've been appointed to serve, and some have had little experience as prosecutors. The nine recent appointees identified [as replacements] held high-level White House or Justice Department jobs, and most of them were handpicked by Gonzales ... Being named a U.S. attorney 'has become a prize for doing the bidding of the White House or administration,' said Laurie Levenson, a former federal prosecutor who is a professor at the Loyola Law School in Los Angeles."
- January 31, 2007: Harriet Miers departs from her position as the President's Legal Counsel, on the effective date of her January 4, 2007 resignation. Fred Fielding succeeds her.

=== February 2007 ===
- February 6, 2007: Regarding the USA PATRIOT Act reauthorization amendments to the interim attorney appointment law, during Senate Judiciary Committee hearings, Senator Arlen Specter stated that his chief counsel, Michael O'Neill, advised "the requested change had come from the Department of Justice, that it had been handled by Brett Tolman, who is now the U.S. Attorney for Utah." Tolman was the former Judiciary Committee counsel when Specter was chair. Tolman became the presidentially nominated and Senate approved United States Attorney for the United States District Court for the District of Utah.
- February 6, 2007: Deputy Attorney General Paul McNulty testified before the Senate Judiciary Committee. He underscored that the U.S. attorneys were fired for job performance issues and not political considerations. He stated: "The indisputable fact is that United States attorneys serve at the pleasure of the President. They come and they go for lots of reasons." In subsequent closed-door testimony to the committee (on April 27, 2007), McNulty said that days after the February hearing, he learned that White House officials had not revealed to him the extent of White House influence and discussions on creating the list. McNulty, a few days after the February hearing, calls Senator Schumer by telephone to apologize for the inaccurate characterization of the firings. At least six of the seven had recently received outstanding job performance ratings. McNulty testified that Bud Cummins, the U.S. Attorney for Arkansas, was removed to install a former aide to Karl Rove and Republican National Committee opposition research director, the 37-year-old Timothy Griffin. Cummins, apparently, "was ousted after Harriet E. Miers, the former White House counsel, intervened on behalf of Griffin." McNulty's testimony that the attorneys were fired for "performance related issues" caused the attorneys to come forward in protest. There is some evidence that the administration was concerned about the attorneys going public with complaints prior to this time.
- February 13, 2007: Kyle Foggo and Brent R. Wilkes are indicted on 11 counts including corruption, bribery, fraud and money laundering.
- February 15, 2007: San Diego U.S. Attorney Carol Lam's last day in office.
- February 16, 2007: Griffin announced that he would not seek the presidential nomination to be chief federal prosecutor in Little Rock.
- February 23, 2007: U.S. Attorney Margaret Chiara of Michigan announces her resignation, effective March 16.
- February 28, 2007: Salon reports that "at least three of the eight fired attorneys were told by a superior they were being forced to resign to make jobs available for other Bush appointees, according to a former senior Justice Department official knowledgeable about their cases."

=== March 2007 ===
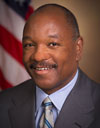
Michael A. Battle announces resignation on March 5, 2007, effective March 16, 2007

- March 5, 2007: Michael A. Battle announces his resignation, effective March 16, 2007, from his position of Director of the Executive Office for United States Attorneys (EOUSA).
- March 6, 2007: Six attorneys testify before the House and Senate Judiciary Committees. Former U.S. Attorney David Iglesias of New Mexico testifies that after October 2006 phone calls from Representative Heather Wilson and Senator Pete Domenici: "I felt leaned on. I felt pressured to get these matters moving."
- March 6, 2007: Gonzales responded to the controversy in an editorial in USA Today in which he said, "To be clear, [the firing] was for reasons related to policy, priorities and management — what have been referred to broadly as "performance-related" reasons — that seven U.S. attorneys were asked to resign last December ... We have never asked a U.S. attorney to resign in an effort to retaliate against him or her or to inappropriately interfere with a public corruption case (or any other type of case, for that matter). Like me, U.S. attorneys are political appointees, and we all serve at the pleasure of the president. If U.S. attorneys are not executing their responsibilities in a manner that furthers the management and policy goals of departmental leadership, it is appropriate that they be replaced ... While I am grateful for the public service of these seven U.S. attorneys, they simply lost my confidence. I hope that this episode ultimately will be recognized for what it is: an overblown personnel matter."
- March 7, 2007: After the revelations of the other firings, Thomas M. DiBiagio, the Maryland U.S. Attorney, said that he had been ousted in 2005 because of political pressure over public corruption investigations into the administration of then-Governor Bob Ehrlich (R).
- March 12, 2007: Chief of Staff Kyle Sampson for Attorney General Gonzales resigns, effectively the same day, from his position at the Department of Justice. Sampson's eventual replacement as the Attorney General's temporary chief of staff is the U.S. Attorney for the Eastern District of Virginia, Chuck Rosenberg of Alexandria, who soon initiates a DOJ inquiry into Goodling's hiring practices.
- March 13, 2007: Gonzales stated in a news conference that he accepted responsibility for mistakes made in the dismissal and rejected calls for his resignation that Democratic members of Congress had been making. He also stood by his decision to dismiss the attorneys: "I stand by the decision and I think it was the right decision", Gonzales said. Gonzales admitted that "incomplete information was communicated or may have been communicated to Congress" by Justice Department officials.
- March 13, 2007: At the request of the House Judiciary Committee, the Justice Department releases documents detailing the firings of U.S. attorneys.
- March 14, 2007: Senator John E. Sununu (R-New Hampshire) became the first Republican lawmaker to call for Gonzales's resignation. Sununu cited not only the controversial firings but growing concern over the use of the USA PATRIOT Act and misuse of national security letters by the FBI.
- March 15, 2007: At least twelve U.S. Senators and one U.S. Representative — including Senators Hillary Clinton (D-New York) and Mark Pryor (D-Arkansas) — had called for Gonzales's resignation.
- March 15, 2007: The Attorney General's office agrees to make five current and former staff members available to the Senate Judiciary Committee, including Kyle Sampson, Deputy Attorney General Paul McNulty and Michael A. Battle, Director of the Executive Office for U.S. Attorneys.
- March 16, 2007: White House spokesman Tony Snow denies that Harriet Miers originally proposed firing all 93 U.S. attorneys: "The most certain thing I can say at this juncture is that Karl Rove has a recollection of Harriet having raised it with him, and his expressing to her that he thought it was a bad idea."
- March 16, 2007: Battle, Director of the Executive Office for United States Attorneys (EOUSA), resigned March 5, 2007, effective March 16, 2007.
- March 20, 2007: The Senate voted 94 to 2 to re-instate the 120-day term limit on interim attorneys appointed by the Attorney General.
- March 20, 2007: President Bush offers to have White House aides, including Karl Rove, meet with members of Congress behind closed doors, without taking an oath and without a transcribed report of the session. Bush also declares that his aides would not testify under oath on the matter if subpoenaed by Congress. Democratic leaders reject the offer, saying the aides should testify under oath in public.
- March 21, 2007: The House Judiciary Committee votes to authorize subpoenas for Rove, Miers, Sampson, William K. Kelley and Scott Jennings.
- March 21, 2007: Senator Dianne Feinstein said she would inquire into whether Debra Wong Yang, the former U.S. Attorney in Los Angeles, was forced to leave her job late last year. Yang had previously investigated Representative Jerry Lewis on the use of earmarks and his relationships with lobbyists and defense contractors. In November, Yang left the DOJ to work at Gibson, Dunn and Crutcher, the same firm who is defending Lewis in the investigation. Yang has stated that she left on her own accord and there has been no evidence presented that she was forced out for her investigation.
- March 22, 2007: The Senate Judiciary Committee authorized subpoenas as well for White House officials Rove, Miers and Kelley.
- March 23, 2007: The DOJ releases records related to the controversy which challenge some of Gonzales's previous statements at the March 13 press conference. At that press conference he stated: "I never saw documents. We never had a discussion about where things stood." However, DOJ records showed that on his November 27 schedule "he attended an hour-long meeting at which, aides said, he approved a detailed plan for executing the purge".
- March 23, 2007: Monica Goodling takes an indefinite leave of absence.
- March 26, 2007: Goodling, senior counsel to Gonzales and liaison to the White House, declines to testify before the Senate Judiciary Committee.
- March 26, 2007: The U.S. House of Representatives also voted to re-instate the 120-day term limit on interim attorneys appointed by the Attorney General, by a vote of 329 to 78.
- March 2007: Emails are released that show that J. Scott Jennings, and aide to Rove, communicated with Justice Department officials "concerning the appointment of Tim Griffin, a former Rove aide, as U.S. attorney in Little Rock ... For that exchange, Jennings, although working at the White House, used an e-mail account registered to the Republican National Committee, where Griffin had worked as a political opposition researcher."
- March 26, 2007: It was announced that Goodling took leave from her job as counsel to the Attorney General and as the Justice Department's liaison to the White House. Goodling was set to testify before Congress, but on March 26, 2007, Goodling cancelled her upcoming appearance at a Congressional hearing, citing her Fifth Amendment right against self-incrimination.
- March 29, 2007: Sampson appears before the Senate Judiciary Committee on to discuss the firings. At that hearing, Sampson stated that, contrary to Attorney General Alberto Gonzales's prior statements, the Attorney General had been involved in the final decision to dismiss the U.S. Attorneys. "I don't think the Attorney General's statement that he was not involved in any discussions of U.S. attorney removals was accurate ... I remember discussing with him this process of asking certain U.S. attorneys to resign." Sampson could not recall information asked by committee members over a hundred times.
- March 29, 2007: In response to allegations to Sampson's testimony Gonzales stated "I don't recall being involved in deliberations involving the question of whether or not a U.S. attorney should or should not be asked to resign ... I signed off on the recommendations and signed off on the implementation plan. And that's the extent of my involvement ... I know what I did and I know the motivations for the decisions that I made were not based on improper reasons."
- March 31, 2007: President Bush responded to questions about the Attorney General and the ongoing controversy while meeting Lula da Silva of Brazil at Camp David by stating: "Attorney General Al Gonzales is an honorable and honest man and he has my full confidence ... I will remind you there is no credible evidence that there has been any wrongdoing ... I appreciate [the dismissed U.S. attorneys'] service. I'm sorry that these hearings and all this stuff have besmirched their reputations. It's certainly not the intent of anybody in this administration."

=== April 2007 ===
- April 6, 2007: The top deputies to Rachel K. Paulose stepped down from their leadership positions and back into their nonsupervisory role within the office to protest the "ideologically driven and dictatorial managerial style" of Paulose. The deputies were John Marti, the top assistant prosecutor; Erika R. Mozangue, chief of the office's civil division; and James E. Lackner.
- April 6, 2007: Goodling announces her resignation from the Department of Justice. She had helped coordinate the dismissal of the attorneys with the White House. Goodling stated in her three-sentence resignation letter to Gonzales: "May God bless you richly as you continue your service to America."
- April 10, 2007: The House Judiciary Committee issued a subpoena for documents from Gonzales that included the full text of all documents that had been partially or completely blacked out in the DOJ's previous release of documents. In a letter accompanying the subpoena, Representative John Conyers (D-Michigan), the chair of the committee, wrote: "We have been patient in allowing the department to work through its concerns regarding the sensitive nature of some of these materials ... Unfortunately, the department has not indicated any meaningful willingness to find a way to meet our legitimate needs ... At this point further delay in receiving these materials will not serve any constructive purpose."
- April 11, 2007: The Justice Department spokesman, Brian Roehrkasse, responded to the subpoena stating that the administration would like "to reach an accommodation with the Congress" but that it might not be possible. "Much of the information that the Congress seeks pertains to individuals other than the U.S. attorneys who resigned ... Furthermore, many of the documents Congress is now seeking have already been available to them for review. Because there are individual privacy interests implicated by publicly releasing this information, it is unfortunate the Congress would choose this option" said Roehrkasse.
- April 11, 2007: A White House spokesman stated that some of the emails that had involved official correspondence relating to the firing of attorneys may have been lost because they were conducted on Republican party accounts and not stored properly. "Some official emails have potentially been lost and that is a mistake the White House is aggressively working to correct" stated Scott Stanzel. He said that they could not rule out the possibility that some of the lost emails dealt with the firing of U.S. attorneys.
- April 12, 2007: CNN reported a larger question concerning the lost emails: "Whether White House officials such as political adviser Karl Rove are intentionally conducting sensitive official presidential business via non-governmental accounts to evade a law requiring preservation — and eventual disclosure — of presidential records."
- April 13, 2007: Documents were released in response to further congressional inquiry that appeared to contradict parts of Sampson's previous testimony before Congress. Sampson said during his testimony that "[he] did not have in mind any replacements for any of the seven who were asked to resign" on December 7, 2006. The released emails showed that Sampson had identified five Bush administration insiders as potential replacements for sitting U.S. attorneys months before those prosecutors were fired: Jeffrey A. Taylor, now chief prosecutor in the District of Columbia, Deborah Rhodes, now the U.S. Attorney in Alabama, Rachel L. Brand, head of the Justice Department's Office of Legal Policy, Daniel Levin, a former senior Justice and White House official who was listed as a San Francisco candidate, as well as Tim Griffin, a former aide to presidential adviser Karl Rove who was later appointed the top federal prosecutor in Little Rock. In response to this information, Sampson's attorney Brad Berenson stated that these candidates were only tentative suggestions and never seriously considered while Justice Department spokesman Brian Roehrkasse said the list "reflects Kyle Sampson's initial thoughts" and "in no way contradicts the department's prior statements" about the lack of a candidate list."
- April 15, 2007: In advance of his scheduled testimony on April 17, Gonzales publishes a statement in The Washington Post. He said "While I accept responsibility for my role in commissioning this management review process, I want to make some fundamental points abundantly clear. I know that I did not — and would not — ask for the resignation of any U.S. attorney for an improper reason. Furthermore, I have no basis to believe that anyone involved in this process sought the removal of a U.S. attorney for an improper reason." The Gonzales statement responded to the allegations that his previous testimony contradicted Sampson testimony before Congress. Gonzales stated: "While I have never sought to deceive Congress or the American people, I also know that I created confusion with some of my recent statements about my role in this matter. To be clear: I directed my then-deputy chief of staff, Kyle Sampson, to initiate this process; fully knew that it was occurring; and approved the final recommendations. Sampson periodically updated me on the review. As I recall, his updates were brief, relatively few in number and focused primarily on the review process. During those conversations, to my knowledge, I did not make decisions about who should or should not be asked to resign."
- April 17, 2007: Gonzales was originally scheduled to testify before Congress. In the aftermath of the mass shooting at Virginia Tech, Senate Judiciary Committee Chairman Patrick Leahy postponed the hearing until April 19.
- April 17, 2007: The Associated Press (AP) reported that Paulose had been contacted by the House Judiciary Committee for voluntary questioning about the firings of eight U.S. federal prosecutors.
- April 19, 2007: Gonzales testified before the Senate Judiciary Committee. He received questioning from both the Democratic and Republican members on the committee; many Republicans on the committee openly criticised the Attorney General and his handling of the matter questioning his honesty, competence and stating that he should "suffer the consequences" from the controversial firings. Gonzales also admitted during the testimony that when he ordered the firing of the U.S. attorneys he did not know the reason for firing two of them. The Attorney General stated that he "didn't have an independent basis or recollection" about the job performance of Nevada U.S. Attorney Daniel G. Bogden. With regards to Chiara, Gonzales stated, "Quite candidly ... I don't recall the reason why I accepted" staff advice on why to dismiss Chiarra and only after the fact did Gonzales learn "it was a question of ... poor-management issues." In another interesting exchange, Gonzales stated that he had approved the decision but did not recall when the decision was made. ("'Well, how can you be sure you made the decision?' Mr. Leahy asked. 'Senator, I recall making the decision from this—I recall making the decision,' Mr. Gonzales replied. 'When?' Mr. Leahy responded. 'Senator,' Mr. Gonzales replied. 'I do not recall when the decision was made.'") Gonzales stated more than 60 times that he "couldn't recall" certain incidents.
- April 19, 2007: After Gonzales's testimony to the Judiciary Committee, both Senators Leahy and Specter expressed their disappointment with the results. Both stated that they still do not have a clear explanation of the reasons the eight attorneys were fired, with Leahy suggesting that political influence was the likely explanation and Specter suggesting that incompetence might be the likely explanation. Both Senators also expressed the concern that, either way, the controversy was undermining the integrity of the Department of Justice.
- April 19, 2007: The White House put out a statement saying "the president was pleased with the attorney general's testimony, and that he felt he answered [the] questions, and that he had admitted mistakes were made, but that he has the full confidence of the president." Leahy replied to the interviewer about the White House statement: "Well, the president has set a very low bar, indeed." CNN later reported that White House insiders thought that Gonzales had hurt himself with his recent testimony and described his performance before the Judiciary committee as "going down in flames", "not doing himself any favors" and "predictable".
- April 23, 2007: President Bush reiterated "The Attorney General ... gave a very candid assessment, and answered every question he could possibly answer, honestly answer, in a way that increased my confidence in his ability to do the job. ... [A]s the investigation, the hearings went forward, it was clear that the Attorney General broke no law, did no wrongdoing. And some senators didn't like his explanation, but he answered as honestly as he could. This is an honest, honorable man, in whom I have confidence."
- April 25, 2007: The House Judiciary Committee passed a resolution, by a 32 to 6 vote, authorizing lawyers for the House to apply for a court order granting Goodling immunity in exchange for her testimony, surpassing the required two-thirds majority. It immediately authorized a subpoena for her.
- April 27, 2007: Paul McNulty testifies in a private meeting with the Senate Judiciary Committee that he was not informed until after his February 6, 2007 public testimony to the committee, that there was extensive White House involvement in former Rove aide Timothy Griffin's appointment as interim U.S. Attorney for Eastern District of Arkansas, nor did he know the extent of Kyle Sampson's nearly year-long effort to compile a dismissal list.

=== May 2007 ===
- May 2, 2007: the Senate Judiciary Committee issued a subpoena to Attorney General Gonzales compelling the Department of Justice to produce all emails from Rove regarding evaluation and dismissal of attorneys that was sent to DOJ staffers, no matter what email account Rove may have used, whether White House, Republican Party, or other accounts, with a deadline of May 15, 2007 for compliance. The subpoena also demanded relevant email previously produced in the Valarie Plame controversy and investigation for the CIA leak scandal.
- May 2, 2007: The Department of Justice announced that two separate investigations into hiring processes conducted by Goodling had been initiated several weeks earlier: one by the department's inspector general and a second by the Office of Professional Responsibility.
- May 10, 2007: Gonzales testified before the House Committee on the Judiciary regarding the dismissal of U.S. attorneys. Gonzales provided no additional information regarding the controversy to the frustration and incredulity of many on the committee. He "acknowledged for the first time Thursday that [other] U.S. attorneys might have resigned under pressure from the Justice Department, but said their departures were unrelated to the controversial firings of eight prosecutors last year." Gonzales testified that there was nothing improper about the dismissal or resignations of Graves, Heffelginger, or Yang. He addressed the cases of Biskupic in Wisconsin and Paulose in Minnesota. Unlike the recent hearing before the Senate Committee on the Judiciary, several Republicans came to the defense of Gonzales, including Lamar Smith of Texas.
- May 11, 2007: U.S. District Court Chief Judge Thomas F. Hogan signed an order granting Monica Goodling immunity in exchange for her truthful testimony in the U.S. Attorney firings investigation, stating that "Goodling may not refuse to testify, and may not refuse to provide other information, when compelled to do so" before the committee.
- May 14, 2007: Karl K. "Kasey" Warner said that he had concerns now that he might have been fired in 2005 for similar reasons to the other U.S. attorneys that were fired. Warner was fired from his position in 2005 as the top as federal prosecutor in Southern West Virginia during the middle of a corruption and vote-buying investigation and never told why he was fired. A spokesman for the White House stated that: "The notion that the termination was political is absolutely false ... We encourage Mr. Warner to provide the department with a written privacy waiver and we will be happy to provide you with the reason for his removal."
- May 14, 2007: Deputy Attorney General Paul McNulty announced his resignation, to be effective in late summer 2007. He is the fourth and highest ranking Department of Justice Official to resign during the controversy, following Michael Battle, Kyle Sampson and Monica Goodling. He was a U.S. Attorney in Virginia before taking the deputy's job in November 2005. It was reported that friends said that McNulty realized that the furor over the prosecutors had likely extinguished his hope to be nominated to become a federal appeals court judge. As recently as March 26, 2007, McNulty had been quoted saying: "I have no plans to step down. I intend to cooperate with the committee in anyway they choose."
- May 15, 2007: James Comey, former Deputy Attorney General (December 2003 through August 2005), testified before the Senate Judiciary Committee. In part of his testimony, he described a March 11, 2004 incident about a secret administration warrantless wiretapping program. Comey was Acting Attorney General during the then Attorney General Ashcroft's acute illness; Comey had in prior consultation with Ashcroft refused to recertify the legality of the wiretapping program. Comey was present at an evening visit by Gonzales and Andrew Card to the hospital bed of Ashcroft. Gonzales requested again renewed authorization of the secret wiretapping program; Ashcroft refused and indicated the correct person to ask was the Acting Attorney General, sitting next to his bed. Comey testified that he and a number of other senior DOJ officers were prepared to resign immediately over the issue. The story shed new light on Gonzales's activities and advocacy while Counselor to the President; there was renewed criticism of Gonzales's suitability to be Attorney General.
- May 23, 2007: Goodling appeared before the House Judiciary Committee under a limited "use immunity" agreement and provided to the committee a written statement that she read at the start of her testimony. In response to questions during the hearing, Goodling stated that she had "crossed the line" and broke civil service laws about hiring, and improperly weighed political factors in considering applicants for career positions at the Department of Justice.
- May 23, 2007: Brian Roehrkasse, Department of Justice Acting Director of Public Affairs, stated in a press release: "Ms. Goodling's testimony today about asking political questions on applicants for career positions is troubling. This matter is the subject of an ongoing investigation by the Justice Department's Office of Inspector General and the Office of Professional Responsibility and we cannot comment further." Deputy Attorney General Paul McNulty also issued a statement: "I testified truthfully at the Feb. 6, 2007, hearing based on what I knew at that time. Ms. Goodling's characterization of my testimony is wrong and not supported by the extensive record of documents and testimony already provided to Congress."
- May 25, 2007: Department of Justice officials disclosed that the internal inquiry into the potentially improper hiring practices of Goodling had been broadened to include the hiring of federal immigration judges. Goodling's written testimony stated that Kyle Sampson had advised: "Office of Legal Counsel (OLC) had provided guidance some years earlier indicating that Immigration Judge appointments were not subject to the civil service rules applicable to other career positions." These 226 civil service positions had 75 appointments during the Bush administration; 49 were appointed since Gonzales became Attorney General. It was also disclosed that during Goodling's tenure, vacancies were not always posted. Justice Department spokesman Dean Boyd said new procedures had been implemented, including the advertising of open positions, as well as the initial examination of applicants by the office of the chief immigration judge. The department disclosed that political consideration had been used for civil service immigration judge selection until, as a consequence of a lawsuit, department lawyers determined that political considerations were improperly a factor in past hirings. Hiring for immigration judges was suspended from December 2006 until April 2007, when a new merit-based evaluation process was initiated. Officials indicated the practice probably began in early 2004. Kyle Sampson began working at the DOJ in late 2003; Goodling became Gonzales's counsel in October 2005, and his senior counselor and White House liaison in April 2006.
- May 30, 2007: Tim Griffin, interim U.S. Attorney for Eastern Arkansas, resigned effective June 1, 2007.

=== June 2007 ===
- June 1, 2007: Tim Griffin departs from office, after announcing his resignation on May 30, 2007.
- June 4, 2007: A bill, number S.214 entitled: A bill to amend chapter 35 of title 28, United States Code, to preserve the independence of United States attorneys. also called Preserving United States Attorney Independence Act of 2007 was sent to President Bush for his signature. The bill reverses the changes in the law that permitted interim U.S. attorneys (appointed by the attorney general) to serve without term limit, restores the interim U.S. Attorney appointment statute that existed between 1986 and 2006. The bill was filed in the Senate by Dianne Feinstein on January 9, 2007 and co-sponsored by 19 Senators. The Senate voted in favor of the bill by 94 to 2 (with 4 not voting) on March 20, 2007. The House voted in favor of a different version of the bill, H.R. 580, by 329 to 78 on March 26, 2007. The House agreed to the Senate version, S.214 on May 22, 2007 by a vote of 306 in favor and 114 against (12 not voting).
- June 5, 2007: Appearing in separate panels before the Senate Judiciary Committee:
  - Bradley J. Schlozman, associate counsel to the director, Executive Office for United States Attorneys (former interim U.S. Attorney for the Western District of Missouri; former principal deputy assistant attorney general; former acting assistant attorney general for the Civil Rights Division, U.S. Department of Justice);
  - Todd Graves, former U.S. Attorney, Western District of Missouri, Kansas City, Missouri.
- June 8, 2007: The Senate Committee on the Judiciary posts notice of a hearing on June 26, 2007 on the nomination by President Bush of William W. Mercer to become the United States Associate Attorney General. The nomination had been submitted to the Senate by President Bush on January 9, 2007; Mercer was appointed Acting Principal Associate Attorney General in September 2006 and concurrently held the position of U.S. Attorney for Montana. Mercer held both cuncurrently through the authority of section 501 of the USA PATRIOT ACT Reauthorization, which was signed into law in March 2006.
- June 11, 2007: A Senate vote on cloture to end debate on the resolution expressing no confidence in Attorney General Alberto Gonzales failed (60 votes are required for cloture). The vote was 53 to 38 with 7 not voting and 1 voting "present" (one Senate seat was vacant). Seven Republicans (John E. Sununu, Chuck Hagel, Susan Collins, Gordon Smith, Olympia Snowe and Norm Coleman) voted to end debate; Independent Democrat Joseph Lieberman voted against ending debate. No Democrat voted against the motion. Not voting: Joe Biden (D-Delaware), Sam Brownback (R-Kansas), Tom Coburn (R-Oklahoma), Christopher Dodd (D-Connecticut), Tim Johnson (D-South Dakota), John McCain (R-Arizona), Barack Obama (D-IL). Ted Stevens (R-Arkansas) voted "present".
- June 11, 2007: Bradley J. Schlozman amended his testimony, indicating that he had not been "directed" to indict for voter fraud, days before the November 2006 election in question, but that Schlozman himself made the decision to indict, after his First Assistant U.S. Attorney had consulted with the Washington DOJ Election Crimes Branch.
- June 13, 2007: The Senate and House Judiciary Committees issued subpoenas to Harriet Miers (former White House Counsel) and Sara Taylor, former deputy assistant to President Bush and the White House director of political affairs to production of documents and appear before the committees to testify. Miers is requested to appear before the Senate Judiciary Committee on July 11, 2007. The White House reiterated its longstanding demand that no past or present White House officials would be permitted to testify under oath before the panels and that private interviews, not under oath and without transcripts, would be permitted. The chairs of the House and Senate Judiciary Committees reiterated that the White House terms were unacceptable. The House Judiciary Committee also issued a subpoena to Chief of Staff Joshua Bolten for relevant documents related to the investigation.
- June 14, 2007: President Bush signs into law Senate bill number 214, the "Preserving United States Attorney Independence Act of 2007". The bill had been sent to the President on June 4, 2007.
- June 15, 2007: Michael Elston, Chief of Staff to Deputy Attorney General Paul McNulty, announced his resignation that day, to be effective in one week from then, June 22, 2007. He became the fifth senior official at the Department of Justice to announce their resignation during the controversy. The other DOJ officials were Michael A. Battle, Kyle Sampson, Monica Goodling and Paul McNulty. In his Senate and House testimony, Elston was accused by four of the dismissed U.S. attorneys of threats of retaliation if they failed to quietly depart. McNulty brought Elston to work at the DOJ and had worked with Elston, while both were at the U.S. Attorney's office for the Eastern District of Virginia in Alexandria.
- June 15, 2007: Mary Beth Buchanan is privately questioned by House and Senate Judiciary Committee staff investigators about her knowledge of the firings of U.S. attorneys. The questioning was at the Rayburn House Office Building in Washington, D.C. In prior testimony before congressional committees, Kyle Sampson said he consulted with Buchanan in compiling the list of candidates to dismiss; Monica Goodling said that Buchanan had hired her and she was aware that Sampson spoke Buchanan about the dismissals. Buchanan is U.S. Attorney for the Western District of Pennsylvania, former Director of the Executive Office for United States Attorneys (EOUSA; from June 2004 to June 2005). Buchanan's lawyer, Roscoe C. Howard Jr., said she was "absolutely not involved" in the firings. Buchanan served as director of the U.S. Justice Department's EOUSA during part of the period under examination by the investigators. Staff committee members stated that a transcript was made, but will not be released as the investigation is still active.
- June 15, 2007: Dan Eggen of The Washington Post reports that the Department of Justice has 23 United States Attorney positions that are held by non-presidential appointees (either interim Attorney General appointees, or Acting U.S. attorneys, filled by civil service). With the June 4, 2007 signing of the Preserving United States Attorney Independence Act of 2007, the DOJ is having difficulty finding candidates to fill positions which will expire in less than 120 days for all interim appointees.
- June 22, 2007: Michael Elston departs from office at the DOJ as Chief of Staff to Deputy Attorney General McNulty, a week after submitting his resignation.
- June 22, 2007: William W. Mercer, concurrently U.S. Attorney for Montana and Acting Associate Attorney General, resigned from the latter post and withdrew his nomination to the same position, days before scheduled confirmation hearings were to be held, on June 25, 2007. Mercer became the sixth senior Justice department official to resign in the controversy and third such to resign late on a Friday afternoon, after many reporters have gone home for the weekend. Mercer had been Acting Associate Attorney General since September 2006; he retained his position as the U.S. Attorney for Montana. Mercer had come under criticism from the chief district court judge of the Montana federal district for his longe absences from Montana. Mercer had been instrumental in inserting into the USA PATRIOT Act Reauthorization, signed into law in March 2006, section 501, which permitted U.S. attorneys to reside outside of their district, at the request and authorization of the Attorney General. The Senate Committee on the Judiciary gave notice of the withdrawal as follows:
  "The hearing on "Executive Nomination" scheduled by the Senate Committee on the Judiciary for Tuesday, June 26, 2007 at 10:00 a.m. in Room 226 of the Senate Dirksen Office Building has been cancelled. The President is withdrawing Mr. Mercer's nomination."

Senate Judiciary Committee Chairman Senator Leahy commented on the nomination withdrawal: "The White House has found many ways to keep sunlight from reaching some of the darker corners of the Bush Justice Department, but this is a new one."

- June 27, 2007: The White House asserted executive privilege to deny the request by congressional judiciary committees demanding testimony before the committees and the production of documents subpoenaed in relation to the dismissal of U.S. attorneys.
- June 28, 2007: Attorney General Gonzales issues a press release stating:

"Mary Beth Buchanan has always had and continues to have my full confidence and support as the U.S. Attorney in the Western District of Pennsylvania. I also appreciate her willingness to step in and effectively run the Office on Violence Against Women and the good work she is doing in that important office. I look forward to her continued service at the Department of Justice."

The statement is issued thirteen days after Buchanan's June 15, 2007 questioning by House and Senate Judiciary Committee staff investigators about her knowledge of the dismissals of U.S. attorneys.

- June 29, 2007: Rachel Brand, Assistant Attorney General leading the DOJ's Office of Legal Policy announced her resignation this Friday afternoon, effective July 9, 2007. During the planning to dismiss U.S. attorneys in San Diego, San Francisco, Michigan and Arkansas, according to documents released during the congressional inquiry, Brand was listed as a potential candidate to replace dismissed U.S. Attorney Margaret Chiara in Michigan. Prior to Joining the DOJ, Brand was associate counsel to President Bush. While in the DOJ, she helped shepherd the nominations of Supreme Court Justices John Roberts and Samuel Alito through Senate confirmation. She was the DOJ legislative manager for the reauthorization of the USA PATRIOT Act, signed into law in March 2006.

=== July 2007 ===
- July 18, 2007: President Bush announces the appointment of Craig S. Morford to the post of Acting United States Deputy Attorney General to replace outgoing Deputy Attorney General McNulty. The appointment is to be effective upon McNulty's departure, which was not stated in the announcement. At the time of the announcement, Morford holds the office of interim U.S. Attorney for the Middle District of Tennessee; he was appointed to the position September 29, 2006. Before that, Morford served as the First Assistant U.S. Attorney in the Northern District of Ohio from November 2003 onward. From August 2004 to March 2005, he served as the interim U.S. Attorney in the Eastern District of Michigan. He also served as a Special Counsel to the Attorney General in that district from 2004 to 2005. Before becoming First Assistant U.S. Attorney, Morford served in 2003 as Criminal Chief in the Northern District of Ohio and as an Assistant U.S. Attorney in the district's Organized Crime Unit from 1990 to 2003. Morford also served as a Special Attorney for the Department of Justice in the Cleveland Organized Crime Strike Force from 1987 to 1990 and as a trial attorney with the Office of the Chief Counsel for the Internal Revenue Service from 1984 to 1987. McNulty had previously stated in May that his resignation would be effective in late summer 2008.
- July 24, 2007: Attorney General Gonzales testifies before the Senate Judiciary Committee concerning oversight of the Department of Justice.
- July 25, 2007: The House Committee on the Judiciary voted along party lines 22 to 17 to issue citations of contempt of Congress to White House Chief of Staff Joshua Bolten and former White House Counsel Harriet Miers. White House Press Secretary Tony Snow said of the move: "For our view, this is pathetic. What you have right now is partisanship on Capitol Hill that quite often boils down to insults, insinuations, inquisitions and investigations rather than pursuing the normal business of trying to pass major pieces of legislation ... now we have a situation where there is an attempt to do something that's never been done in American history, which is to assail the concept of executive privilege, which hails back to the Administration of George Washington". Committee Chairman John Conyers said "Unlike other disputes involving executive privilege, the President has never personally asserted privilege. The committee has never been given a privilege log, and there is no indication the President was ever personally involved in the termination decisions." Having passed the Committee the motion goes to the full House, where it is unlikely to receive a vote until after Congress's August recess. If the motion passes the full House, the case would likely be given to the interim U.S. Attorney for the District of Columbia, Jeffrey Taylor. "The administration has said it will direct federal prosecutors not to prosecute contempt charges."

=== August 2007 ===
- Mid-August 2007: Bradley J. Schlozman resigns from his position as the Director of the Executive Office for U.S. Attorneys (EOUSA). He was the former head of the Civil Rights Division. At the time of his resignation, requests for documents and responses to interrogatories issued by the Senate Judiciary Committee were still outstanding and unresponded to, with a due date of August 28, 2008. The Chairman of the Senate Committee, Patrick Leahy, indicated that previously authorized subpoenas would be issued if the requests were still outstanding after the due date.
- August 24, 2007: Wan J. Kim, Assistant Attorney General for the DOJ Civil Rights Division since November 2005, announced his resignation, effective at the end of August 2007. Kim has questioned by congressional Democrats about Bush administration policy and allegations by former career officials of improper hiring within the division, mostly under his predecessor Bradley J. Schlozman. Schlozman resigned a week earlier; and had bragged about hiring conservative staff for the department. Kim had distanced himself from Schlozman's statements, at a Senate Committee hearing in June 2007. Kim said his hirings were without political ideology: "Talent and competence and ability to me matter, and other things don't matter."
- August 24, 2007: Attorney General Gonzales telephones President Bush, informing of his intention to resign.
- August 26, 2007: Gonzales submits his letter of resignation to the President.
- August 27, 2007: Gonzales announces his resignation, to be effective September 17, 2007, at a press conference at the Department of Justice in Washington. Administration officials disclose that Solicitor General Paul Clement is to become Acting Attorney General. Holding the fourth-ranking position in the DOJ, Clement is the next highest officeholder that has been confirmed to office by the Senate—the Deputy Attorney General and Associate Attorney general are both filled by acting officials.

=== September 2007 ===
- September 6, 2007: Peter Keisler, Assistant Attorney General for the Civil Division of the DOJ announces his resignation from the Department of Justice effective September 21, 2007. Keisler states he desires to "spend time with his family". On June 29, 2006, Bush forwarded to the Senate the nomination of Keisler to serve on the U.S. Circuit Court of Appeals for the District of Columbia, to fill the position vacated by then Supreme Court Chief Justice John Roberts. The Senate has not acted on the nomination.
- September 14, 2007: In the morning Gonzales gave a speech remarking on his hopes and accomplishments, without mentioning the issues that led to is resignation. That afternoon Gonzales is feted in a standing-room only farewell ceremony at the DOJ. Notable attendees include Secretary of State Condoleezza Rice, Homeland Security Secretary Michael Chertoff, former Solicitor General Theodore Olson, former White House Chief of Staff Andrew Card; Card's wife, the Reverend Kathleen Card, said a short prayer at the beginning of the ceremony.
- September 17, 2007: Alberto Gonzales's term in office ends 12:01 a.m. on September 17, 2007. Soon after departure from the DOJ, continuing inquiries by Congress and the Justice Department lead Gonzales to hire a criminal-defense lawyer, George Terwilliger, partner at White & Case and former Deputy Attorney General under former President George H. W. Bush. Terwiliger was on the Republican law team involved in Florida presidential election recount battle of 2000.
- September 17, 2007: President Bush announces his nomination of former Circuit Court Judge Michael Mukasey to serve as Attorney General, subject to confirmation by the Senate. President Bush also announces a surprise appointment: Peter Keisler is to become Acting Attorney General, superseding his previous August 27, 2007, appointment of Solicitor General Paul Clement as Acting Attorney General. According to administration officials, Paul Clement took the Acting Attorney General office at 12:01 a.m. on September 17, 2007; he left office 24 hours later. Apparently the appointment change was made the day before, on Sunday, with no consultation with Justice Department officials. The last-minute change is reported to add an additional element of uncertainty to working at the DOJ. Nearly every top senior official has resigned over the course of the Gonzales administration of the DOJ. Keisler is the Assistant Attorney General for the DOJ Civil Division.
- September 18, 2007: Keisler enters office as Acting Attorney General, as of 12:01 a.m.

=== October 2007 ===
- October 2, 2007: Attorney General nominee Mukasey's responses to Senate Judiciary Committee are received and published.
- October 3, 2007: Senator Patrick Leahy outlines in a letter to Michael Mukasey the issues related to U.S. attorneys, documents, executive privilege and openness with the Senate Judiciary Committee that Leahy desires a commitment on, during a proposed private meeting on October 16, 2007.
- October 4, 2007: Senator Leahy indicates that the committee nomination hearing is scheduled to commence October 17, 2007.
- October 12, 2007: Terms of those of the eleven interim U.S. attorneys appointed by Alberto Gonzales that have not been confirmed by the Senate expire today, 120 days after the signing of the Preserving United States Attorney Independence Act of 2007 by President Bush on June 14, 2007. The law restored the interim U.S. Attorney appointment process that had been modified in 2006 by the USA PATRIOT Act. Vacancies lasting longer than 120 days are subject to appointment of interim U.S. attorneys by that district's federal judges. Some of the interim U.S. attorneys with expiring terms are: Nelson Cohen, Alaska; Daniel Knauss, Arizona; Rosa Rodriguez-Velez, Puerto Rico; Jeffrey Taylor, District of Columbia. James Dedrick, Eastern District of Tennessee, was confirmed by the Senate in October. Scott Schools is reappointed by San Francisco's federal judges for up to another four months for the Northern District of California. Jeffrey C. Sullivan, for the Western District of the State of Washington and Karen Hewitt for the Southern District of California were reappointed by their respective federal district's judges. Rodriguez-Velez was approved by the Senate Judiciary Committee in August, but Senator Bob Menendez (D-New Jersey) has put a hold on the full Senate vote for her confirmation.
- October 17, 2007: Mukasey appears before the Senate Judiciary Committee and promises to block political meddling at the Justice Department, if confirmed as Attorney General. He declined to distance himself from Bush administration policies about eavesdropping without warrants, authorized by Bush after the September 11 attacks and calling the program the "Terrorist Surveillance Program". Democratic Senators appreciated Mukasey's promise to impose new rules to limit contacts between politicians and the Justice Department, a promise clearly intended to distance Mukasy from the controversy that enveloped Alberto Gonzales surrounding the dismissal of U.S. attorneys. Mukasey indicated that torture of terrorist suspects is illegal under U.S. and international law, as well as that there was no presidential authority to order it; he criticised a rescinded Justice Department opinion that allowed abusive interrogation techniques. Arlen Spector said at the hearing that the Department of Justice "urgently needs a restoration of integrity and honesty and independence ... We have seen a situation where there have been serious allegations of political influence, and it is very important that those matters be cleared up."
- October 18, 2007: In Mukaseys's second day of confirmation hearings, many of the ten Democratic committee members were disturbed when Mukasey repeatedly declined to state whether waterboarding is torture. The technique s not allowed by the U.S. military, but been used by the Central Intelligence Agency. It is widely condemned as torture by human rights groups. Members of the committee subsequently followed up with written requests for clarification, which Mukasey provided October 30, 2007, which still did not satisfy numerous Democratic Senators.
- October 31, 2007: Senators Patrick Leahy and Dianne Feinstein sent a letter to Acting Attorney General Keisler, criticising the lack of presidential nominees for vacant U.S. Attorney positions, citing of the 96 U.S. Attorney offices, 23 positions are filled by interim or Acting U.S. attorneys, 21 of which have no presidential nominee. They inquired if the open positions are being worked on. They cited the nine U.S. attorneys with expiring terms on October 12, 2007: interim United States attorneys in the District of Alaska, the District of Arizona, the Northern and Southern Districts of California, the District of Columbia, the Northern District of Iowa, the Western District of Michigan, the District of Puerto Rico and the Southern District of West Virginia. They also cited the term of another interim appointment, in the Southern District of Illinois, set to expire the first week of November 2007. They also criticized administration use of office vacancy laws to fill offices for as long as 330 days without needing to consult the Senate:

Three of these interim appointees, for the Southern District of Illinois, the District of Puerto Rico and the Southern District of West Virginia, along with those in two other districts, were appointed to be interim United States Attorneys after serving a 210-day term as Acting United States Attorney under the Vacancies Act. Acting under the guidance of what we believe to be an erroneous opinion of the Justice Department's Office of Legal Counsel, the Administration has been employing this misguided approach to put somebody in place for 330 days without the advice and consent of the Senate. This approach runs afoul of Congressional intent and the law.

== 2008 ==
=== January 2008 ===
- January 30, 2008: John Conyers issues a request for information to Attorney General Mukasey in advance of a February 7, 2008 House Judiciary Committee hearing with the Attorney General, about the removal of a press outlet Talking Points Memo (TPM) from the DOJ Office of Public affairs press release distribution list about October 10, 2007. TPM had been a leading press investigator and was early to publicize many aspects of the attorney dismissal controversy. DOJ Press Assistant Jamie Hais, in the Office of Public Affairs had earlier replied to TPM's inquiry about being re-instated "As you may realize we have a lot of requests to be put on our media lists and we simply are not able to put everyone on the list."

=== February 2008 ===
- February 14, 2008: The full United States House of Representatives voted 223 to 32 to pass the contempt resolutions against White House Chief of Staff Joshua Bolten and former White House Counsel Harriet Miers.
- February 29, 2008: Attorney General Michael Mukasy refuses to enforce the contempt of Congress citation by convening a grand jury, as required by United States Law 2 U.S.C 194.

=== March 2008 ===
- March 10, 2008: The House Judiciary Committee files suit in Federal Civil Court against White House Chief of Staff Joshua Bolten and former White House Counsel Harriet Miers for failure to comply with their subpoenas.

=== April 2008 ===
- April 2, 2008: The United States Department of Justice Office of the Inspector General reported that an investigation was being conducted on the dismissal of a career civil service Justice Department prosecutor Leslie Hagen from her position in the Washington offices of the Justice Department because of rumors that she is a lesbian. In October 2005, former U.S. Attorney for Minnesota Thomas Heffelfinger had asked Hagen to come to Washington from Michigan, where she had been a federal prosecutor. NPR reported that:
  Hagen received the highest possible ratings for her work as liaison between the Justice Department and the U.S. attorneys' committee on Native American issues. Her final job evaluation lists five categories for supervisors to rank her performance. For each category, a neat X fills the box marked, "Outstanding." And at the bottom of the page, under "overall rating level", she also got the top mark: Outstanding.
  The form is dated February 1, 2007. Several months before that evaluation, Hagen was told her contract would not be renewed.

NPR journalist Ari Shapiro connected the dismissal to Monica Goodling's admission that she had failed to observe civil service statutes in personnel decisions within the Justice Department.

- April 13, 2008: Neil Lewis, writing for The New York Times, reported that Gonzales has been unsuccessful in his solicitation of law firms for a job. It is extraordinary that a former U.S. Attorney General has not been welcomed into a firm; law firm sources indicated that Gonzales's reputation is dimmed by his role in the dismissal of federal prosecutors and the open criticism he received from senators and representatives while testifying about the dismissal of U.S. attorneys and during his testimony about a secret eavesdropping program. Ongoing investigations by the Office of the Inspector General of the Justice Department are un-concluded at this date. His income since he left office on September 17, 2007 has come from speaking engagements. Schools such as Washington University in St. Louis, Ohio State University and the University of Florida have each paid him about $30,000 plus expenses for appearances; business groups are being charged a little more.

=== July 2008 ===
- July 28, 2008: The Department of Justice Office of the Inspector General (IG) and the Office of Professional Responsibility (OPR) jointly issued a 146-page report describing the conclusions of the investigation by both offices. This was the second joint report issued regarding the politicization of personnel decisions. In June a report was issued about DOJ Honors Program and the Summer Law Intern Program (SLIP). The IG and Professional Responsibility offices explored allegations of improper dismissal of U.S. attorneys in 2006 and allegations of politicized hiring for non-political career civil service positions by senior DOJ officers. The report surveyed the activities of a number of staff members and focused on the conduct of aides closest to Attorney General Gonzales, especially Monica Goodling and Kyle Sampson; the report also concluded that White House staff was involved in a number of hiring decisions. The report concluded that Goodling's, Sampson's and other aides' personnel actions constituted official misconduct, that was a violation of federal Civil Service laws and DOJ policies. All but one of the DOJ officials cited in the report for misconduct have left; the report recommended that the sole official remaining at the DOJ whose conduct was reviewed in the report, John Nowacki, be considered for disciplinary action. Goodling and other lawyers cited in the report could face disciplinary action through their state bar associations for their misconduct. The issue of political evaluations of civil service hires was reported to have occurred before Goodling's elevation within the DOJ. Under Attorney General Ashcroft, the prior DOJ White House liaison, Susan Richmond, prevented the deputy attorney general's office from extending the term of one lawyer because Richmond believed that the position should be filled by an appointee loyal to president Bush.
- July 30, 2008: The House Judiciary Committee recommended that the House of Representatives find Karl Rove to be in contempt of Congress for failing to appear in response to a subpoena to testify before the committee. The committee voted 20 to 14 along party lines. The recommendation passes to the House for further action. The White House has asserted executive privilege, claiming that current and former presidential advisors cannot be forced to testify before Congress. The full House voted in February 2008 to hold in contempt White House Chief of Staff Joshua Bolten and Harriet Miers, former White House Counsel. In December 2007, the Senate Judiciary Committee voted, 12 to 7, to hold Rove and Bolten, the White House Chief of Staff, in contempt for failing to comply with its own subpoenas. In that vote the ranking Republican, Senator Arlen Specter from Pennsylvania, voted in favor of the contempt citations.

=== September 2008 ===
- September 1, 2008: On Labor Day, the Associated Press reports that a forthcoming DOJ Inspector General's report will describe Gonzales's handing of certain highest-level classified documents (also called sensitive compartmentalized information, SCI). Gonzales responded to the report through his lawyer George Terwilliger, who served as the U.S. Deputy Attorney General from 1991 to 1992; the Associated Press had received a copy of the twelve-page memorandum and its three-page addendum. Via the memorandum Gonzales admits that certain notes and documents about the NSA warrantless wiretap program and other topics had not been properly stored, but denies that any inappropriate exposure of the documents had occurred. The forthcoming Inspector General's report is one of three that are anticipated; one anticipated report in the coming months will review Gonzales's role in the dismissal of nine U.S. attorneys.
- September 29, 2008: Attorney General Mukasey announced the appointment of a special prosecutor to investigate the activities surrounding the nine U.S. Attorney dismissals. Mukasey named Nora Dannehy, the Acting U.S. Attorney for Connecticut, as the special counsel.

== 2009 ==
- January 7, 2009: The National Association of Assistant United States Attorneys (NAAUSA), which represented about 1,300 assistant U.S. attorneys, sent a letter President-elect Barack Obama and the Justice Department urging Obama to not dismiss all incumbent U.S. attorneys and to "consider the reappointment of such incumbent United States attorneys who have provided exceptional service during their tenure." The NAAUSA also asked that the Obama administration refrain from dismissing U.S. attorneys until after replacements are confirmed, to enable "orderly transition".
- January 21, 2009: At the start of the Obama administration, of the 93 U.S. attorneys, 54 are held by Senate-confirmed Bush appointees; 18 are career assistant U.S. attorneys, performing as Acting U.S. attorneys; 18 are interim appointees appointed by district federal judges and 3 are interim appointees, appointed by the Bush administration (not confirmed by the Senate).
- July 31, 2009: The White House announces that Barack Obama nominated four United States attorneys, including the previously dismissed Daniel G. Bogden, for the District of Nevada.

== 2010 ==
- July 21, 2010: Department of Justice prosecutors closed the two-year investigation without filing charges after determining that the charges were inappropriately political, but not criminal, saying: "Evidence did not demonstrate that any prosecutable criminal offense was committed with regard to the removal of David Iglesias. The investigative team also determined that the evidence did not warrant expanding the scope of the investigation beyond the removal of Iglesias."
