= 2006 dismissal of U.S. attorneys hearings =

See Dismissal of U.S. attorneys controversy documents for publicly released documents and hearings transcripts.

The United States House Committee on the Judiciary and the Senate Committee on the Judiciary, have oversight authority over Department of Justice (DOJ). In 2007 it conducted public and closed-door oversight and investigative hearings on the DOJ's interactions with the White House and staff members of the Executive Office of the President. A routine oversight hearing on January 18, 2007 by the Senate committee was the first public congressional occasion that Attorney General Gonzales responded to questions about dismissed United States Attorneys (USAs). Both committees invited or subpoenaed past and present Department of Justice officers and staff to appear and testify during 2007, and both committees requested or subpoenaed documents, and made the documents that were produced publicly available.

== Calendar of public hearings ==
=== Hearing dates with witnesses ===
- January 18, 2007 - Senate Judiciary Committee: Oversight of the U.S. Department of Justice

Witness: Alberto Gonzales, Attorney General

- February 6, 2007 - Senate Judiciary Committee: Is the DOJ Politicizing the Hiring and Firing of U.S. Attorneys?

Witnesses:
Senator Mark Pryor (D-Arkansas)
Paul J. McNulty, Deputy Attorney General, U.S. Department of Justice
Mary Jo White, Partner, Debevoise & Plimpton, LLP, New York, NY
Laurie L. Levenson, Professor of Law, Loyola Law School, Los Angeles, CA
Stuart M. Gerson, Partner, Epstein Becker & Green, Washington, DC

- March 6, 2007 - House and Senate Judiciary Committees, in separate hearings
  - House: Subcommittee on Commercial and Administrative Law: H.R. 580, Restoring Checks and Balances in the Confirmation Process of U.S. Attorneys
  - Senate: "Part II–Preserving Prosecutorial Independence"

Witnesses for both hearings:
William Moschella, principal associate deputy attorney general, Department of Justice
Carol Lam, Former U.S. Attorney
David Iglesias, Former U.S. Attorney
Bud Cummins, Former U.S. Attorney
John McKay, Former U.S. Attorney
Daniel Bogden, Former U.S. Attorney
Paul Charlton, Former U.S. Attorney
John Smietanka, Former U.S. Attorney
Representative Darrell Issa, R-California
Former Representataive Asa Hutchinson
Former Deputy Attorney General George Terwilliger

- March 29, 2007 - Senate Judiciary Committee: Preserving Prosecutorial Independence: Is the Department of Justice Politicizing the Hiring and Firing of U.S. Attorneys? -– Part III

Witness: D. Kyle Sampson, former Chief of Staff to Attorney General Gonzales

- April 19, 2007 - Senate Judiciary Committee: "Department of Justice Oversight

Witness: Attorney General Alberto Gonzales

- May 3, 2007 - House Judiciary Committee, Subcommittee on Commercial and Administrative Law: Hearing on The Continuing Investigation into the U.S. Attorneys Controversy

Witness: James Comey, Former Deputy Attorney General

- May 11, 2007 - House Judiciary Committee

Witness: Attorney General Alberto Gonzales

- May 15, 2007 - Senate Judiciary Committee: Preserving Prosecutorial Independence: Is the Department of Justice Politicizing the Hiring and Firing of U.S. Attorneys? –- Part IV

Witness: James Comey, Former Deputy Attorney General

- May 23, 2007 - House Judiciary Committee: The Continuing Investigation into the U.S. Attorneys Controversy and Related Matters

Witness: Monica K. Goodling, former DOJ White House Liaison

- June 5, 2007 - Senate Judiciary Committee: Preserving Prosecutorial Independence: Is the Department of Justice Politicizing the Hiring and Firing of U.S. Attorneys? -- Part V

Panel 1: Bradley J. Schlozman, Associate Counsel to the Director, Executive Office for United States Attorneys.

Former Interim U.S. Attorney for the Western District of Missouri; Former Principal Deputy Assistant Attorney General; Former Acting Assistant Attorney General for the Civil Rights Division, U.S. Department of Justice, Washington, DC

Panel 2: Todd Graves, Former U.S. Attorney, Western District of Missouri, Kansas City, MO

- June 7, 2007 - Senate Judiciary Committee: "Prevention of Deceptive Practices and Voter Intimidation in Federal Elections: S. 453" - Senator Cardin presiding.

Witness List:

  - Panel I

Charles Schumer, United States Senator [D-NY]
Barack Obama, United States Senator [D-IL]

  - Panel II

Douglas F. Gansler, Attorney General, State of Maryland, Baltimore, MD
Jack B. Johnson, County Executive, Prince George’s County, MD, Upper Marlboro, MD

  - Panel III

Hilary O. Shelton, Director, Washington Bureau, National Association for the Advancement of Colored People [NAACP], Washington, DC
John Trasvina, President and General Counsel, Mexican American Legal Defense and Education Fund MALDEF, Los Angeles, CA
Richard Briffault, Joseph P. Chamberlain Professor of Legislation, Columbia Law School, New York, NY
William B. Canfield, Principal, Williams & Jensen PLLC, Washington, DC
Peter N. Kirsanow, Commissioner, United States Commission on Civil Rights, Washington, DC

- June 13, 2007 Senate Committee on Rules and Administration

Nominations to the Federal Election Commission

Steven T. Walther (Nevada), Nominated to term expiring April 30, 2009 (vice Scott E. Thomas, term expired)
Robert D. Lenhard (Maryland), Nominated to term expiring April 30, 2011 (vice Danny L. McDonald, term expired)
David V. Mason (Virginia), Nominated to term expiring April 30, 2009 (reappointment)
Hans von Spakovsky (Georgia), Nominated to term expiring April 30, 2011 - Recess appointee to the FEC (vice Bradley A. Smith, resigned)

- June 15, 2007 'House Judiciary Committee, staff investigators

Private interview:

Mary Beth Buchanan, U.S. Attorney for the Western District of Pennsylvania, former director of the U.S. Justice Department's Executive Office for United States Attorneys from June 2004 to June 2005

- July 24, 2007 Senate Judiciary Committee

Witness: Attorney General Alberto Gonzales. Concerning Oversight of the Department of Justice.

== Gonzales testimony ==
=== Senate Judiciary Committee - January 18, 2007 ===
Gonzales stated:

"What we're trying to do is ensure that for the people in each of these respective districts, we have the very best possible representative for the Department of Justice," Gonzales testified, adding later: "I would never, ever make a change in a United States attorney for political reasons or if it would in any way jeopardize an ongoing serious investigation. I just would not do it."

=== Senate Judiciary Committee - April 19, 2007 ===
Alberto Gonzales was scheduled to testify before Congress on April 17, 2007 (Link to Gonzales's April 19, 2007 opening statement). In the aftermath of the mass shooting at Virginia Tech, Senate Judiciary Committee chairman Patrick Leahy postponed the hearing until April 19. In advance of his testimony, a separate Gonzales statement was published in the Washington Post on April 15, 2007. He said "While I accept responsibility for my role in commissioning this management review process, I want to make some fundamental points abundantly clear. I know that I did not -- and would not -- ask for the resignation of any U.S. attorney for an improper reason. Furthermore, I have no basis to believe that anyone involved in this process sought the removal of a U.S. attorney for an improper reason." The Gonzales statement responded to the allegations that his previous testimony contradicted Sampson testimony before Congress. Gonzales stated: "While I have never sought to deceive Congress or the American people, I also know that I created confusion with some of my recent statements about my role in this matter. To be clear: I directed my then-deputy chief of staff, Kyle Sampson, to initiate this process; fully knew that it was occurring; and approved the final recommendations. Sampson periodically updated me on the review. As I recall, his updates were brief, relatively few in number and focused primarily on the review process. During those conversations, to my knowledge, I did not make decisions about who should or should not be asked to resign."

On April 19, 2007, Gonzales testified before the Senate Judiciary Committee. Gonzales received intense questioning from both the Democratic and Republican members on the committee. Many Republicans on the committee openly criticised the attorney general and his handling of the matter questioning his honesty, competence and stating that he should "suffer the consequences" from the controversial firings. Gonzales also admitted during the testimony that when he ordered the firing of the US attorneys he did not know the reason for firing two of them. The attorney general stated that he "didn't have an independent basis or recollection" about the job performance of Nevada U.S. Attorney Daniel G. Bogden. With regards to Chiara, Gonzales stated, "Quite candidly . . . I don't recall the reason why I accepted" staff advice on why to dismiss Chiarra and only after the fact did Gonzales learn "it was a question of . . . poor-management issues." In another interesting exchange, Gonzales stated that he had approved the decision but didn't recall when the decision was made. ("'Well, how can you be sure you made the decision?' Mr. Leahy asked."'Senator, I recall making the decision from this—I recall making the decision,' Mr. Gonzales replied. "'When?' Mr. Leahy responded."'Senator,' Mr. Gonzales replied. 'I don't recall when the decision was made.') Gonzales stated more than 60 times that he "couldn't recall" certain incidents.

After Gonzales's April 19, 2007 testimony to the Judiciary Committee, both Senators Leahy and Specter expressed their disappointment with the results. Both stated that they still do not have a clear explanation of the reasons the eight attorneys were fired, with Leahy suggesting that political influence was the likely explanation, and Specter suggesting that incompetence might be the likely explanation. Both Senators also expressed the concern that, either way, the controversy was undermining the integrity of the Department of Justice. The White House put out a statement that day saying "the president was pleased with the attorney general's testimony, and that he felt he answered [the] questions, and that he had admitted mistakes were made, but that he has the full confidence of the president." Leahy replied to the interviewer about the White House statement: "Well, the president has set a very low bar, indeed." CNN later reported that White House insiders thought that Gonzales had hurt himself with his recent testimony and described his performance before the Judiciary committee as "going down in flames," "not doing himself any favors," and "predictable."

A few days later, President Bush reiterated "The Attorney General ... gave a very candid assessment, and answered every question he could possibly answer, honestly answer, in a way that increased my confidence in his ability to do the job....[A]s the investigation, the hearings went forward, it was clear that the Attorney General broke no law, did no wrongdoing. And some senators didn't like his explanation, but he answered as honestly as he could. This is an honest, honorable man, in whom I have confidence." Nevertheless, Gonzales continued to come under increasing criticism, including from "key GOP lawmakers".

=== House Judiciary Committee - May 10, 2007 ===
Alberto Gonzales testified before the U.S. House Committee on the Judiciary regarding the dismissal of U.S. Attorneys. His prepared oral, and extended written statements were released in advance of the hearing at the House Judiciary Committee. Link to Gonzales's oral statement May 10, 2007 Link to Gonzales's extended written statement, May 10, 2007 He provided no additional information regarding the controversy to the frustration and incredulity of many on the committee. He "acknowledged for the first time Thursday that [other] U.S. attorneys might have resigned under pressure from the Justice Department, but said their departures were unrelated to the controversial firings of eight prosecutors last year." Gonzales testified that there was nothing improper about the dismissal or resignations of Graves, Heffelginger, or Yang. He addressed the cases of Biskupic in Wisconsin and Paulose in Minnesota. Unlike the April 19, 2007 hearing before the Senate Committee on the Judiciary, several Republicans came to the defense of Gonzales, including Lamar Smith of Texas.

=== Senate Judiciary Committee - July 24, 2007 ===
- Attorney General Gonzales's Prepared Statement Before the Committee on the Judiciary, United States Senate, Concerning Oversight of the Department of Justice. July 24, 2007 (via Senate Judiciary Committee).

== McNulty testimony ==
=== Senate Judiciary Committee - February 6, 2007 ===
Concerns expressed by Senators Feinstein and Pryor concerning the Senate's prerogative in confirming U.S. Attorney nominations in early January were followed up by hearings before the Senate Judiciary Committee on February 6, 2007 called by Senator Schumer (D, New York) with Deputy Attorney General Paul McNulty as witness. McNulty underscored that the seven were fired for job performance issues, and not political considerations. McNulty later called Senator Schumer by telephone to apologize for that inaccurate characterization of the firings, however. At least six of the seven had recently received outstanding job performance ratings. McNulty testified that Bud Cummins, the U.S. Attorney for Arkansas, was removed to install a former aide to Karl Rove and Republican National Committee opposition research director, the 37-year-old Timothy Griffin. Cummins, apparently, "was ousted after Harriet E. Miers, the former White House counsel, intervened on behalf of Griffin." In subsequent closed-door testimony on April 27, 2007 to the committee, McNulty said that days after the February hearing, he learned that White House officials had not revealed to him White House influence and discussions on creating the list.

McNulty's testimony that the attorneys were fired for "performance related issues" caused the attorneys to come forward in protest.

== Sampson testimony ==
=== Senate Judiciary Committee - March 29, 2007 ===
Sampson appeared before the Senate Judiciary Committee on March 29, 2007 to discuss the firings. At that hearing, Sampson stated that, contrary to Attorney General Alberto Gonzales's prior statements, the Attorney General had been involved in the final decision to dismiss the US Attorneys. "I don't think the attorney general's statement that he was not involved in any discussions of U.S. attorney removals was accurate...I remember discussing with him this process of asking certain U.S. attorneys to resign."

In response Gonzales stated "I don't recall being involved in deliberations involving the question of whether or not a U.S. attorney should or should not be asked to resign...I signed off on the recommendations and signed off on the implementation plan. And that's the extent of my involvement...I know what I did and I know the motivations for the decisions that I made were not based on improper reasons." Media attention has highlighting Sampson's inability to recall the events surrounding the Dismissal of the U.S. Attorneys. Sampson could not recall information asked by committee members over a hundred times.

In a press conference on April 3, 2007, President Bush responded to questions about the attorney general and the ongoing controversy by stating: "Attorney General Al Gonzales is an honorable and honest man and he has my full confidence...I will remind you there is no credible evidence that there has been any wrongdoing...I appreciate [the dismissed US Attorneys'] service. I'm sorry that these hearings and all this stuff have besmirched their reputations. It's certainly not the intent of anybody in this administration."

On April 13, 2007, documents were released in response to further Congressional inquiry that appeared to contradict parts of Sampson's testimony. Sampson said during his testimony that "[he] did not have in mind any replacements for any of the seven who were asked to resign" on December 7, 2006. The released emails showed that Sampson had identified five Bush administration insiders as potential replacements for sitting U.S. attorneys months before those prosecutors were fired: Jeffrey A. Taylor, now chief prosecutor in the District of Columbia, Deborah Rhodes, now the U.S. attorney in Alabama, Rachel L. Brand, head of the Justice Department's Office of Legal Policy, Daniel Levin, a former senior Justice and White House official who was listed as a San Francisco candidate, and Tim Griffin, a former aide to presidential adviser Karl Rove who was later appointed the top federal prosecutor in Little Rock. In response to this information, Sampson's attorney stated that these candidates were only tentative suggestions and never seriously considered. Justice Department spokesman Brian Roehrkasse said the list "reflects Kyle Sampson's initial thoughts" and "in no way contradicts the department's prior statements" about the lack of a candidate list."

== Goodling testimony ==
Monica Goodling served in the Department of Justice and was the Justice Department's liaison to the White House. As such, she had helped coordinate the dismissal of the attorneys with the White House. Congress had called Goodling to testify regarding her role in the dismissals, but after originally agreeing to appear, Goodling cancelled, citing the Fifth Amendment right against self-incrimination. On April 6, 2007, Monica Goodling resigned from her position at the Department of Justice.

=== House Judiciary Committee - May 23, 2007 ===
Goodling appeared before the House Judiciary Committee, on May 23, 2007, under a grant of limited immunity. She provided to the committee a written statement that she read at the start of her testimony. In response to questions during the hearing, Goodling stated that she had "crossed the line" and broke civil service laws about hiring, and improperly weighed political factors in considering applicants for career positions at the Department of Justice. Link to The Washington Post transcript of the hearing.

Goodling cited McNulty's testimony to the Committee as being "incomplete or inaccurate," and stated that McNulty should have properly disclosed to the committee his:

(1) knowledge of White House role in creating the list of USAs to dismiss;
(2) knowledge of the White House role in the selection of Tim Griffin as the interim USA;
(3) the DOJ's assessment of the Parsky Commission, an evaluation committee set up in California to assess, screen and put forward candidates for political appointments such as for U.S. attorneys;
(4) knowledge of allegations that Tim Griffin conducted vote caging, a potentially illegal partisan effort remove targeted populations from the voting registration lists, during the 2004 Bush presidential campaign. (Such allegations would make Griffin's confirmation by the Senate more difficult.)

McNulty responded in a press release from the DOJ, the same day as the hearing, stating:

I testified truthfully at the Feb. 6, 2007, hearing based on what I knew at that time. Ms. Goodling's characterization of my testimony is wrong and not supported by the extensive record of documents and testimony already provided to Congress.

== Sara Taylor testimony ==
On July 11, 2007, Sara Taylor, former top aide to Karl Rove, testified before the Senate Judiciary Committee. She was granted the unusual allowance of having her attorney, W. Neil Eggleston, next to her at the witness table to advise her on which questions she could answer and remain in accord with Bush's claim of executive privilege. Throughout Taylor's testimony, she refused to answer many questions, saying "I have a very clear letter from [White House counsel] Mr. [Fred] Fielding. That letter says and has asked me to follow the president's assertion of executive privilege." Chairman Patrick Leahy (D-VT) dismissed the claims and warned Taylor she was "in danger of drawing a criminal contempt of Congress citation". Senator Ben Cardin (D-MD) took issue with the claim as well, telling Taylor

You seem to be selective in the use of the presidential privilege. It seems like you're saying that, 'Yes, I'm giving you all the information I can,' when it's self-serving to the White House, but not allowing us to have the information to make independent judgment.

Leahy added

I do note your answer that you did not discuss these matters with the president and, to the best of your knowledge, he was not involved is going to make some nervous at the White House because it seriously undercuts his claim of executive privilege if he was not involved.

He also said

It's apparent that this White House is contemptuous of the Congress and feels it does not have to explain itself to anyone, not to the people's representatives in Congress nor to the American people.

In summary, Taylor told the Senate that she

"did not talk to or meet with President Bush about removing federal prosecutors before eight of them were fired", she had no knowledge on whether Bush was involved in any way in the firings, her resignation had nothing to do with the controversy, "she did not recall ordering the addition or deletion of names to the list of prosecutors to be fired", and she refuted the testimony of Kyle Sampson, Attorney General Alberto Gonzales' chief of staff, that she sought "to avoid submitting a new prosecutor, Tim Griffin, through Senate confirmation."
