= Jeffrey A. Taylor =

Vice President, General Counsel & Secretary for ExxonMobil Holdings Corporation

Jeffrey "Jeff" A. Taylor
- Born: Jeffrey A. Taylor
- Education: Stanford University (Bachelor); Harvard Law School (JD)
- Title: Vice President, General Counsel & Secretary for ExxonMobil Holdings Corporation (2024–present)

Jeffrey "Jeff" A. Taylor is the former interim United States Attorney for the District of Columbia and Executive Vice President and General Counsel for Fox Corp. He currently serves as Vice President, General Counsel & Secretary of ExxonMobil Holdings Corporation. He has a bachelor’s degree in history from Stanford University and a Juris Doctor degree from Harvard Law School.

== Career ==
Prior to his work in Washington, DC, Jeffrey Taylor served as an Assistant U.S. Attorney for the Southern District of California from 1995–1999. From 1999 to 2002, Mr. Taylor served as majority counsel on the Senate Judiciary Committee where he advised Chairman Orrin Hatch and drafted provisions of the USA PATRIOT Act.

Before his appointment as U.S. Attorney, Mr. Taylor served as Counselor to Attorneys General John Ashcroft and Alberto Gonzales from 2002 to 2006 where he oversaw law enforcement operations by U.S. attorneys. He was appointed interim U.S. Attorney for the District of Columbia by Alberto Gonzales on September 22, 2006 and was sworn in seven days later; interim U.S. attorneys do not need to be confirmed by the Senate. Interim U.S. attorneys have no term limit, as a result of an amendment to the law governing interim attorneys included in the USA Patriot Reauthorization Act of 2005; formerly interim appointees had a 120-day term limit, and could be re-appointed (without term limit) at the end of the 120-day term by the chief judge of the district court. On May 28, 2009, Taylor announced his resignation.

In 2009, he joined Ernst & Young as the leader for the Americas region.

In 2010, he joined Raytheon Company as Vice President and General Counsel.

In 2015, Taylor joined General Motors as Deputy General Counsel and in 2016, took on additional responsibility serving as the Chief Compliance Officer.

In 2019, Taylor joined Fox Corp as Chief Litigation Counsel and Executive Vice President. He was promoted to General Counsel in 2021.

Taylor serves as Board Member in the Legal Aid Foundation of Los Angeles.

== U.S. Attorneys controversy ==
2006 dismissal of U.S. attorneys controversy
- Timeline
- Summary of attorneys
- Congressional hearings
- List of dismissed attorneys
- All related articles

Mr. Taylor's position came under heightened interest in March 2007 during the dismissal of U.S. attorneys controversy. On March 20, 2007, President Bush declared in a press conference that White House staff would not testify under oath on the matter if subpoenaed by Congress. Anyone who ignores a Congressional subpoena can be held in contempt of Congress, but the D.C. U.S. Attorney must convene a grand jury to start the prosecution of this crime.

Under 2 U.S.C. § 194, once either the House or the Senate issues a citation for contempt of Congress, it is referred to the U.S. Attorney for the District of Columbia, "whose duty it shall be to bring the matter before the grand jury for its action." It is unclear (as of March 20, 2007) whether Mr. Taylor would fulfill this duty to convene a grand jury, or resist Congress at the direction of Bush or Gonzales.
