= Moschella =

Moschella is a surname. Notable people with the surname include:

- Domenico Moschella (c. 1948–2015), Canadian politician
- William Moschella (born 1968), American lawyer
