= Daniel Bogden =

American attorney

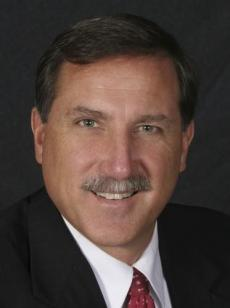

United States Attorney for the District of Nevada
- In office September 15, 2009 – March 10, 2017
- President: Barack Obama; Donald Trump
- Preceded by: Greg Brower
- Succeeded by: Nicholas A. Trutanich
- In office 2001–2007
- Appointed by: George W. Bush

Personal details
- Born: 1956 (age 69–70) Ohio, U.S.
- Education: Ashland University (BS); University of Toledo (JD)

Daniel G. Bogden (born 1956) is an American attorney who served as United States Attorney for the District of Nevada.

An Independent, he was nominated for the position on September 4, 2001, by Republican President George W. Bush and unanimously confirmed by the United States Senate on October 23, 2001. He served for four years. He was kept in the position by President Bush for another two years until December 2006, when he was suddenly dismissed without explanation by President Bush along with eight other US Attorneys in the Dismissal of U.S. attorneys controversy. Bogden was re-nominated to the position on July 31, 2009, by President Barack Obama, and served in that role again until being dismissed by President Donald Trump in March 2017 as part of the 2017 dismissal of U.S. attorneys.

== Early life and education ==
Bogden, an Ohio native, holds a Bachelor of Science degree in business administration from Ashland University in Ashland, Ohio, and a Juris Doctor degree from the University of Toledo College of Law.

== Career ==
Bogden has worked for the United States Air Force Judge Advocate General's Office and the Washoe County District Attorney's Office. In 1990, he joined the United States Attorney's Office in Reno, Nevada. In 1998, Bogden became Chief of the Reno Division of the United States Attorney's Office. Between his tenures as United States Attorney, he was a partner in the Nevada law firm of McDonald Carano Wilson LLP.

=== Dismissal of U.S. attorneys controversy ===
Bogden was one of eight attorneys dismissed as part of the Dismissal of U.S. attorneys controversy in 2006. When Bogden was fired, Nevada US Senator John Ensign (R), who had originally nominated him, was decidedly unhappy, particularly after hearing explanations by the Justice Department of the reasons. Ensign commented: "What the Justice Department testified yesterday is inconsistent with what they told me. I can't even tell you how upset I am at the Justice Department." A week later, Ensign said "I'm calling on the President of the United States and the attorney general to restore Dan Bogden's reputation....Everyone in Nevada thought Dan had done a superb job....I believe a very good man was wronged and a process was flawed."

Paul McNulty, a senior DOJ official noted, in an email two days before the dismissals, "I'm still a little skittish about Bogden. He has been with DOJ since 1990 and, at age 50, has never had a job outside of government." McNulty's "skittishness" was reportedly due to concern that Bogden would be unable to find employment and care for his family; this was assuaged in a 90-second meeting with Monica Goodling, where he was informed that Bogden was not married; this ended his concern, and the firing proceeded as planned.

=== Joint action with the Federal Trade Commission ===
On August 25, 2016, Bogden joined with the Federal Trade Commission (FTC) in filing a lawsuit against the OMICS Group and Srinubabu Gedela, the president of the conglomerate The action was taken partly in response to on-going pressure from the academic community to act against predatory publishers and the organizers of predatory conferences. The complaint was lodged with the United States District Court for the District of Nevada and alleges that the defendants have been "deceiving academics and researchers about the nature of its publications and hiding publication fees ranging from hundreds to thousands of dollars" and notes that "OMICS regularly advertises conferences featuring academic experts who were never scheduled to appear in order to attract registrants" causing attendees to "spend hundreds or thousands of dollars on registration fees and travel costs to attend these scientific conferences." Attorneys for the OMICS Group published a response on their website, claiming "your FTC allegations are baseless. Further we understand that FTC working towards favoring some subscription based journals publishers who are earning Billions of dollars from scientists literature," and suggesting that corporations in the scientific publishing business were behind the allegations.

== See also ==
- 2017 dismissal of U.S. attorneys
