= Michael Elston =

American lawyer

Michael J. Elston

118th President General of the Sons of the American Revolution
- In office 2025–2026
- Preceded by: Darryl Addington
- Succeeded by: William A. Greenly

Personal details
- Born: 1969 (age 56–57) Rockford, Illinois, U.S.
- Children: 2
- Education: Drake University (BA); Duke University (JD)

Michael J. Elston (born 1969) is an American lawyer and civic leader. He serves as acting secretary of the board of governors for the United States Postal Service (USPS), in Washington, D.C. Elston has served as the associate general counsel and chief ethics and compliance officer for the USPS since 2014. From November 2005 to June 2007, he was a political appointee in the administration of President George W. Bush, serving as the chief of staff and counselor, Office of the Deputy Attorney General, United States Department of Justice, before resigning in the wake of the dismissal of U.S. attorneys controversy. He was appointed as an Assistant United States Attorney in 1999 by Attorney General Janet Reno. In 2025, he was elected as the President General of the Sons of the American Revolution.

== Early life, education and clerkship ==
Elston grew up in Rockford, Illinois, where he attended Rockford Auburn High School graduating in 1987. He received his undergraduate degree from Drake University in 1991, where he was president of Theta Chi and vice president of the student senate. He was a co-winner of the Oreon E. Scott Award, and he was named the 1991 recipient of Theta Chi's Reginald E.F. Colley Trophy. He earned his J.D. degree from the Duke University School of Law, where he graduated with high honors in 1994. He served as the Administrative Editor of the journal Law & Contemporary Problems. From 1994 to 1996, Elston clerked for judge Pasco M. Bowman of the United States Court of Appeals for the Eighth Circuit.

== Career ==
=== Private practice ===
From 1997 to 1999, he worked as an attorney on the staff of the Shughart Thomson & Kilroy firm in Kansas City, Missouri. While there, he argued and won a case involving prisoner rights before all 11 judges of the U.S. Court of Appeals for the Eighth Circuit.

=== Department of Justice ===
In 1999, he was named an assistant U.S. Attorney in the Northern District of Illinois in Rockford where he served until 2002. From there he moved to the Eastern District of Virginia, where he worked on the prosecutions of John Walker Lindh, the American who fought alongside the Taliban in Afghanistan; and Zacarias Moussaoui, the convicted al-Qaida operative who alternately claimed and denied a role in the September 11 attacks. Elston also worked on early drafts of the Patriot Act. He served as co-chief of criminal appeals from 2003 to 2005, when he became counsel to the U.S. Attorney. From 2005 to 2007, he was chief of staff to U.S. Deputy Attorney General Paul McNulty. From October 2005 to October 2006, he also represented the attorney general as the Justice Department's ex officio member of the United States Sentencing Commission.

=== Dismissal of U.S. attorneys controversy ===
While serving as chief of staff to the deputy attorney general, Elston was involved in the dismissal of eight U.S. attorneys, and was accused of threatening "at least four" of the fired U.S. attorneys. Elston denied these allegations, and a subsequent report by the Department of Justice Office of the Inspector General (OIG) concluded that "we do not have sufficient evidence to conclude that Elston intended to threaten" any of the dismissed U.S. Attorneys. Elston resigned in June 2007 following the May 2007 announcement of the resignation of the Deputy Attorney General whom he served as chief of staff.

One of the dismissed attorneys, John L. Brownlee, testified that Elston had called him on behalf of Paul McNulty and asked him to extend a deadline for Purdue Pharma regarding their drug OxyContin. Brownlee declined and his name appeared on Elston's list of attorneys to be fired eight days later. Elston stated that he did not recall any link between the two events.

=== Allegations of politicized hirings ===
In June 2008, the OIG issued a separate report alleging that Elston had violated federal regulations by taking political affiliations into account when screening hires for the department. Elston denied the allegations, and he was rehired by the federal government 18 months later. In July 2008, the OIG issued a report regarding another DOJ official in which the OIG detailed efforts that Elston, a Republican, made to retain individuals with Democratic party affiliations in leadership positions in the Office of the Deputy Attorney General despite objections from other DOJ officials.

=== United States Postal Service ===
In 2010, Elston rejoined the government and continued his public service with the Office of the General Counsel of the United States Postal Service after two years in private practice with the McGuireWoods law firm in its Tysons Corner and Washington, D.C. offices. In 2011, he was promoted to the position of Chief Counsel, Appellate and Commercial Litigation. From 2012 to 2014, he served as Chief Counsel, Employment Law. He was appointed to his present position in May 2014.

In June 2018, the postmaster general of the United States appointed Elston as the acting secretary of the board of governors of the U.S. Postal Service.

Elston has served as the dedicating postal official for two United States postage stamps. In May 2016, he was the dedicating official for the "Repeal of the Stamp Act, 1766" Forever stamp at the World Stamp Show in New York, New York. Elston is quoted as saying that "the stamp represents what’s great about America and Americans. Whether born here or only just recently arrived, we share in common a passionate love of liberty and freedom, and the willingness to sacrifice whatever it takes — even ‘our lives, our fortunes and our sacred honor’ — to defend our liberties and our freedom.”

In March 2019, Elston dedicated the Star Ribbon Forever stamp at the American Stamp Dealers Association, Inc., (ASDA) Midwest Postage Stamp Show. At the ceremony, Elston said, "This beautiful stamp features the five-pointed star, one of America’s most enduring symbols.... [It] is a modern take on patriotic stamps and evokes the connectedness of the American people, reminding us that there is so much more that unites us than divides us.”

== Awards and publications ==
In September 2006, the Department of Justice gave Elston its highest award presented to attorneys for contributions and excellence in legal performance – the John Marshall Award – "for his outstanding legal advice, leadership and excellence related to the appellate work of the Eastern District of Virginia." He is also a recipient of the Liam O'Grady Award for outstanding service to the Special Assistant U.S. Attorneys Program in the Eastern District of Virginia and a Certificate of Appreciation from the Drug Enforcement Administration.

Elston is also a co-author of the two-volume treatise "Grand Jury Law & Practice", which is updated annually.

== Personal life ==
Elston was the senior warden of Pohick Church from 2011 to 2014. He was first elected to the vestry in 2010 and was immediately selected as junior warden. He also served as chair of the church's 66th annual country fair in 2011. He was a member of the vestry and junior warden of Emmanuel Episcopal Church in Rockford, Illinois, from 2001 to 2002. He was a member of the board of directors of Shelter Care Ministries, a ministry of the Episcopal Diocese of Chicago, from 2001 to 2002.

Elston joined the Sons of the American Revolution (SAR) in 2006 and became the George Washington Chapter, Virginia SAR President in 2013, followed by his election as the 97th Virginia SAR President in 2017.

In 2025, Elston became the 118th President General of the National Society of the Sons of the American Revolution (National SAR).. Additionally, he is a national trustee and was a member of the executive committee from 2016 to 2017. In 2015, he was elected to a three-year term as a director of the SAR Foundation, and in 2017 he was elected vice president of the SAR Foundation. He has received several SAR awards, including the Minuteman Award, the Gold Good Citizenship Medal, the Distinguished Service Medal (national, state and chapter levels), and Meritorious Service Medal (national, state and chapter levels).

In February 2026, he served as a Grand Marshall of the George Washington Birthday Parade in Old Town Alexandria, alongside DAR President General Ginnie Sebastian Storage.

In April 2018, Elston was sworn in as the senior state president of the Virginia Society, Children of the American Revolution (CAR). He was also appointed senior national ethics chairman for the CAR.
