= Greg Brower =

American politician (born 1964)

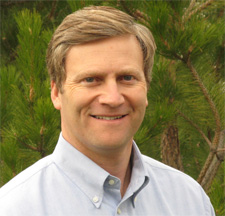

Member of the Nevada Senate from the 15th district
- In office January 2011 – February 20, 2016
- Preceded by: Bill Raggio
- Succeeded by: Jesse Haw

United States Attorney for the District of Nevada
- In office January 7, 2008 – October 10, 2009
- President: George W. Bush; Barack Obama
- Preceded by: Steven Myhre (Acting)
- Succeeded by: Daniel Bogden

Inspector General of the Government Publishing Office
- In office October 3, 2004 – October 1, 2006
- President: George W. Bush
- Preceded by: Marc Nichols
- Succeeded by: Anthony Ogden

Member of the Nevada Assembly from the Washoe County's 37th district
- In office November 1998 – October 2004
- Preceded by: Peter Ernaut
- Succeeded by: Sharron Angle

Personal details
- Born: Gregory Allen Brower; February 8, 1964 (age 62) South Milwaukee, Wisconsin, U.S.
- Party: Republican
- Spouse: Loren Brower
- Children: 2
- Education: University of California, Berkeley (BA); George Washington University (JD)
- Website: Official website

Military service
- Allegiance: United States
- Branch/service: United States Navy
- Years of service: 1987–1993
- Rank: Lieutenant

Gregory Allen Brower (born February 8, 1964) is an American attorney in private practice, former state senator in the Nevada Senate, former United States Attorney in the state of Nevada and a former member of the Nevada Assembly. He is a member of the Republican Party. Currently, Brower sits on the bipartisan advisory board of States United Democracy Center.

== Early life, education and early career ==
Brower was born on February 8, 1964, in South Milwaukee, Wisconsin, and moved to Nevada at a young age. He graduated from Bonanza High School in Las Vegas in 1982, and he attended the University of California, Berkeley—where he received his bachelor's degree in political economy in 1986. Brower later received a J.D. degree from George Washington University in 1992.

Following college, Brower served as a surface warfare officer on a warship in the Pacific Fleet and in the Pentagon in the United States Navy during active and reserve duty from 1987 to 1993. He was a commissioned officer with the rank of Lieutenant.

== United States Attorney for the District of Nevada ==
Brower served as the United States Attorney for the District of Nevada, Nevada's chief federal prosecutor, from 2008 to 2009.

He was nominated to the U.S. Attorney post by President George W. Bush on November 15, 2007, and confirmed by the U.S. Senate on December 13, 2007.

Immediately prior to his nomination, Brower worked as a lawyer in the Bush administration from 2003 to 2007. He first worked in the U.S. Justice Department, and then served as Inspector General and general counsel for the Government Printing Office.

As U.S. Attorney, Brower oversaw a team of nearly 50 federal prosecutors in Nevada. During his tenure, he oversaw the prosecution of 1,100 people charged with violating federal criminal laws and secured a 90% conviction rate. Brower also oversaw 700 civil cases as U.S. Attorney, and he won 90% of the cases.

He left office on October 10, 2009, following the nomination and confirmation of Daniel Bogden to replace him by President Barack Obama.

In 2017, Brower was cited for misconduct from his time as a federal prosecutor in Nevada by the U.S. Equal Employment Opportunity Commission. The decision found that a former female prosecutor was a victim of sex discrimination during the time Brower headed the U.S. attorney's office.

== Nevada Legislature ==
In 1998, Brower was elected to the Nevada Assembly and served two terms. Brower represented Nevada Senate District 15, previously called Washoe County District 3, in the Nevada Senate, a position he was appointed to by the Washoe County Commission following the resignation of Sen. Bill Raggio in January 2011.

=== 77th Regular Session - 2011 ===
- Senate Committee on Judiciary
- Senate Committee on Revenue and Economic Development

== Opposition to President Donald Trump ==
In 2020, Brower, along with over 130 other former Republican national security officials, signed a statement that asserted that President Trump was unfit to serve another term, and "To that end, we are firmly convinced that it is in the best interest of our nation that Vice President Joe Biden be elected as the next President of the United States, and we will vote for him."

In October 2020, Brower signed a letter, along with 19 other Republican-appointed former U.S. Attorneys, calling President Donald Trump "a threat to the rule of law in our country" and endorsing Joe Biden.

Brower, along with more than 100 Republican former national security officials, signed a letter in November that stated that the delay of the presidential transition imperiled the security of the nation. The 9/11 Commission finding that the shortened transition to the administration of George W. Bush during the disputed 2000 presidential election "hampered the new administration in identifying, recruiting, clearing, and obtaining Senate confirmation of key appointees” was mentioned in the statement.

== Electoral history ==
Nevada State Assembly, Washoe District 37 Primary Election, 1998
Party	Candidate	Votes	%
Republican	Greg Brower	3,262	49.22
Republican	John Reese	761	11.48
Republican	Riho Saffen	829	12.51
Republican	Randi Thompson	1,776	26.79

Nevada State Assembly, Washoe District 37 General Election, 1998
Party	Candidate	Votes	%
Republican	Greg Brower	8,777	56.59
Republican	Randi Thompson	6,733	43.41

Nevada State Assembly, Washoe District 37 Primary Election, 2000
Party	Candidate	Votes	%
Republican	Greg Brower	4,963	76.76
Republican	Buddy Wright	705	10.90
Others	Undervote	798	12.34

Nevada State Assembly, Washoe District 37 General Election, 2000
Party	Candidate	Votes	%
Republican	Greg Brower	16,467	78.35
Independent American	Daniel Timothy Lee	1,149	5.47
Libertarian	Karen M. Savage	3,399	16.17

Nevada State Assembly, Washoe District 26 Primary Election, 2002
Party	Candidate	Votes	%
Republican	Greg Brower	2,903	48.81
Republican	Sharron Angle	3,045	51.19

Nevada State Senate, Washoe Senate District 3 Appointment, 2011
Party	Candidate	Votes	%
Republican	Greg Brower	4	100
Republican	Patricia Cafferata	0	0
Republican	Barbara Smith Campbell	0	0
Republican	James Galloway	0	0
Republican	Toni Harsh	0	0
Republican	Derrick Johnson	0	0
Republican	James Nadeau	0	0
Republican	Dan Reaser	0	0
Republican	Ken Santor	0	0
Republican	Tim D. Smith	0	0
Republican	Claudia VanLydegraf	0	0
Republican	Michael Weber	0†	0

† Washoe County Commissioner Bonnie Weber recused herself from voting because her husband was a candidate for the appointment

Nevada State Senate, District 15 General Election, 2012
Party	Candidate	Votes	%
Republican	Greg Brower	29,352	50.23
Democratic	Sheila Leslie	29,086	49.77
