= John McKay (attorney) =

American lawyer

Personal details
- Born: John Larkin McKay; June 19, 1956 (age 70) Seattle, Washington, U.S.
- Education: University of Washington; Creighton University School of Law
- Occupation: Lawyer; former United States Attorney; law professor

John Larkin McKay (born June 19, 1956) is a former United States Attorney for the Western District of Washington.

== Background ==
McKay, a member of a prominent Republican family in the state, attended Seattle Preparatory School and the University of Washington, where he received a Bachelor of Arts degree in political science in 1978. After working as an aide to Congressman Joel Pritchard (R-WA) in 1978–79, McKay earned his J.D. degree at Creighton University School of Law in Omaha, Nebraska in 1982.

He was admitted to the Washington State Bar and joined the Seattle law firm of Lane Powell Spears Lubersky in 1982, eventually becoming a litigation partner with that firm. He then joined Cairncross & Hempelmann in Seattle, leading its litigation group and serving as a member of its management committee.

McKay served as a White House Fellow in 1989-90.

He was admitted to practice before the United States District Court, the Ninth Circuit Court of Appeals, and the United States Supreme Court.

== Career as U.S. Attorney and dismissal ==
McKay was one of eight U.S. attorneys fired by the Bush administration in 2006 which were, after the fact, publicly described as being for performance-related issues related to "policy, priorities and management."

== Appointment as U.S. Attorney ==
McKay was appointed United States Attorney by President George W. Bush in October 2001. He had received a positive evaluation seven months before he was dismissed. Among his noteworthy achievements was the successful prosecution of terrorist Ahmed Ressam. Deputy Attorney General James B. Comey gave McKay the additional responsibility of overseeing a pilot program for a computer system (called Law Enforcement Information Exchange) for his success he earned the United States Navy's highest civilian honor.

The Seattle Times noted in February 2007, "One of the most persistent rumors in Seattle legal circles is that the Justice Department forced McKay, a Republican, to resign to appease Washington State Republicans angry over the 2004 governor's race. Some believe McKay's dismissal was retribution for his failure to convene a federal grand jury to investigate allegations of voter fraud in the race."

On March 17, 2007, the Seattle Times reported, "Former Republican congressman Rick White, one of three candidates the Republicans have submitted to replace John McKay as U.S. attorney for Western Washington, cannot practice law in the state. White's license was suspended by the state Supreme Court in August 2003 for failure to pay his bar dues. He was reinstated to the bar in 2005 after paying a small fee, but currently holds an 'inactive' status", which is common for attorneys that are not actively practicing law.

In congressional testimony, Kyle Sampson, chief of staff to Attorney General Alberto Gonzales, testified that McKay may have been fired at least in part because of his advocacy for a more-aggressive investigation into the cold case murder of Assistant U.S. Attorney Thomas C. Wales of Seattle. In 2018, the FBI reported Wales's death was likely the result of a conspiracy that included a contract killer. His pursuit of the case and subsequent firing were the subjects of an article by Jeffrey Toobin in the August 6, 2007 issue of The New Yorker. Toobin noted that Gonzales assured Wales's family that the investigation was still a top priority of the Justice Department.

== Post-U.S. Attorney career ==
On May 21, 2007, Getty Images announced that McKay would join the corporation as senior vice president and general counsel, based in its headquarters in Seattle.

On September 17, 2007, Jonathan Klein, CEO of Getty Images, announced that McKay would be stepping down as general counsel to return to the law faculty at Seattle University where he would teach full-time. McKay was a partner at Davis Wright Tremaine in Seattle. McKay left Davis Wright Tremaine in 2021.

During his career as a U.S. Attorney, McKay was the prosecutor of Canadian marijuana activist Marc Emery for marijuana seed distribution from Canada. Since that time, McKay has called for reform of marijuana laws such that its sale be legally regulated and taxed.
