= National Association of Assistant United States Attorneys =

Professional organization

The National Association of Assistant United States Attorneys is a professional association founded in 1993 to represent the interests of Assistant U.S. Attorneys —front line federal prosecutors and civil attorneys representing the United States in civil litigation. The organization is dedicated to promoting, protecting and serving the common interests of its members. As of 2018, the union-like organization has over 1,500 members.

The association is managed by a board of directors from 17 regions across the country and three at-large directors.

Since its founding, the organization had focused mainly on issues surrounding employment, rather than public policy, but in 2009 the organization urged President Obama to not fire all 93 incumbent U.S. Attorneys, but to keep some of the top performers. In early 2014, NAAUSA opposed U.S. Department of Justice support for legislation that would soften the use of mandatory minimum sentences for drug offences, after conducting an online poll of AUSAs the previous November. As of May 2017, the association was preparing a policy recommendation on asset forfeiture. They have also opposed portions of the Electronic Communications Privacy Act.

== Process of Becoming an Assistant United States Attorney ==
To become an Assistant United States Attorney, candidates must go through a competitive process that is supposed to select for strong litigation skills, the ability to uphold the ethical standards of the Department of Justice, and a commitment to public service. In order to be considered for this position, candidates must be an active member of the United States bar, and must have a Juris Doctor (J.D) degree from an accredited law school, approved by the American Bar Association (ABA).

Candidates interested in becoming an AUSA are required to submit an in depth resume, cover letter, and also legal writing samples. The United States Department of Justice will then conduct extensive background checks. These include a review of the candidate’s criminal record, professional history, and also references. If background checks are passed, candidates proceed to the final step of the process, where they are interviewed by a panel of classified United States Attorneys.

Once selected, candidates will receive guidance and training. This training will be focused on different considerations, including case management strategies, and unique responsibilities associated with serving as a federal prosecutor. This allows the necessary knowledge to effectively represent the U.S. in criminal and civil trials.

== Key Responsibilities ==
Key responsibilities of Assistant United States Attorney are working with law enforcement agencies to carefully investigate cases, prepare charges, and present evidence effectively in court. They also aid in the prosecution of federal crimes, civil litigation, and they give legal advice to federal agencies. AUSAs serve as trusted advisors to federal agencies, and they will also defend lawsuits against federal agencies as well.
