= Brian Roehrkasse =

Brian J. Roehrkasse (born September 21, 1973) is a former government official who served as Director of Public Affairs for the United States Department of Justice during the last two years of the George W. Bush Administration (2007–2009).

== Biography ==
Roehrkasse is from Urbandale, Iowa. He was on the campaign staff for George W. Bush in 2000. From 2001 to 2002, Roehrkasse served in the Office of Public Affairs at the Department of Transportation. In 2002, he moved to the then newly created Department of Homeland Security where he served as press secretary. While at the Department of Homeland Security he was responsible for communicating sensitive intelligence and threat information to the press during several heightened periods of threat.

After serving as Deputy Director of Public Affairs at the Department of Jusctice during the dismissal of U.S. attorneys controversy, he was promoted to director in 2007. While at the Department of Justice, he served as a communications strategist during the passage of the USA PATRIOT Act Reauthorization, the modernization of the Foreign Intelligence Surveillance Act and other significant national security and counterterrorism laws that remain in place under the Obama Administration. He also served as a spokesperson for the Department on litigation concerning detainees suspected of engaging in terrorism.

In 2013, Roehrkasse was a signatory to an amicus curiae brief submitted to the Supreme Court in support of same-sex marriage during the Hollingsworth v. Perry case. Prior to working in Washington, Roehrkasse lived in San Diego and worked in the San Diego office of Porter Novelli. He graduated from Colorado State University in 1996 with a bachelor's degree in journalism.
