= Paul McNulty =

American lawyer (born 1958)

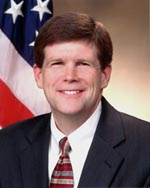

32nd United States Deputy Attorney General
- In office March 17, 2006 – July 26, 2007
- President: George W. Bush
- Preceded by: James Comey
- Succeeded by: Mark Filip

United States Attorney for the Eastern District of Virginia
- In office September 14, 2001 – September 14, 2005
- President: George W. Bush
- Preceded by: Kenneth E. Melson
- Succeeded by: Charles P. Rosenberg

Personal details
- Born: Paul Joseph McNulty; January 21, 1958 (age 68) Pittsburgh, Pennsylvania, U.S.
- Party: Democratic (before 1987); Republican (1987–present)
- Spouse: Brenda Millican
- Education: Grove City College (BA); Capital University (JD)

Paul Joseph McNulty (born January 31, 1958) is an American attorney and university administrator who, in 2025, concluded his tenure as the ninth president of Grove City College. He served as the Deputy Attorney General of the United States from March 17, 2006, to July 26, 2007. Prior to that, he was the U.S. Attorney for the Eastern District of Virginia.

He was nominated as U.S. Attorney by President George W. Bush and confirmed on September 14, 2001. McNulty was nominated to the position of Deputy Attorney General on October 20, 2005, following the withdrawal of Timothy Flanigan's candidacy. McNulty was sworn into office on March 17, 2006. He replaced acting Deputy Attorney General Robert McCallum Jr. McNulty graduated from Grove City College, a small Christian school in western Pennsylvania, in 1980. He received his Juris Doctor (J.D.) from the Capital University School of Law in 1983.

As a U.S. Attorney, McNulty is most noted for overseeing the prosecution of a number of high-profile cases, including those against terror suspects John Walker Lindh, Ahmed Omar Abu Ali and Zacarias Moussaoui. Before becoming a U.S. Attorney, McNulty directed President Bush's transition team for the Department of Justice and then served as Principal Associate Attorney General. From 1990 to 1993, under President George H. W. Bush, McNulty was the Justice Department's director of policy.

On July 30, 2007, McNulty announced that he would be joining the law firm of Baker McKenzie as a partner in their Washington, D.C., office.

On May 16, 2014, Grove City College named McNulty their ninth president. He also serves on the board of trustees of the Trinity Forum. McNulty served as the president of Grove City College until his retirement in 2025. He was replaced by Bradley Lingo.

== Career before Department of Justice ==
McNulty started his public career in 1983 "as a Democrat and counsel to the House Ethics Committee, [before] eventual bec[oming] a Republican...."

McNulty served the United States Congress for 12 years. He was Chief Counsel and Director of Legislative Operations for the Majority Leader of the U.S. House of Representatives. He was also Chief Counsel to the House Subcommittee on Crime where he served for eight years. During those years he was a principal draftsman of many anti-terrorism, drug control, firearms and anti-fraud statutes. He also served as chief counsel and communications director for House Judiciary Committee Republicans during the impeachment of President Bill Clinton.

== Career at Department of Justice ==
McNulty has played a significant role in shaping criminal justice policy in the Commonwealth of Virginia. He was a primary architect of the "Parole Abolition and Sentencing Reform" initiative in 1994, and he served on the board of the Department of Criminal Justice Services and the advisory committee of the Office of Juvenile Justice and Delinquency Prevention.

The Washington Post noted: "He helped shepherd John D. Ashcroft through a contentious confirmation as attorney general in 2001 and was appointed the U.S. attorney in Alexandria three days after the Sept. 11, 2001, attacks. McNulty, who had no trial experience, presided over a dramatic expansion of that office over the next four years before taking over as Gonzales's second-in-command."

As Deputy Attorney General, McNulty reported to the Attorney General, and served as Chairman of Attorney General Alberto Gonzales' Advisory Committee and as Chairman of the Washington/Baltimore High Intensity Drug Trafficking Area.

In December 2006 McNulty issued Charging Guidelines for Corporate Fraud Prosecutions, which are informally referred to as the "McNulty Memorandum." The guidelines replaced the Thompson Memorandum, which was issued in January 2003 by then-Deputy Attorney General Larry Thompson, and provides guidance to federal prosecutors in deciding whether to charge a corporation, rather than or in addition to individuals within the corporation, with criminal offenses. Under the Thompson memo, in deciding whether a corporation was cooperating with an investigation, prosecutors were allowed to consider two controversial factors: 1) whether a company would agree to waive the attorney-client privilege in regard to conversations had by its employees, and 2) whether a company had declined to pay attorneys' fees for its employees. The McNulty Memo requires that when federal prosecutors seek privileged attorney-client communications or legal advice from a company, the U.S. Attorney must obtain written approval from the Deputy Attorney General.

On May 14, 2007, McNulty announced his resignation in a letter to Attorney General Alberto Gonzales. McNulty's resignation took effect July 26, 2007.

== U.S. attorneys controversy ==
In January 2007, shortly after a number of U.S. attorneys were fired the same day (December 7, 2006), Congress began investigations. McNulty became a central figure after he told the Senate Judiciary Committee in a hearing on February 6, 2007, "that the White House played only a marginal role in the dismissals," a statement that was contradicted by later testimony and subsequently released documents. He also said most of the prosecutors were fired for "performance-related" reasons. That statement angered many of the dismissed U.S. attorneys, most of whom had very positive evaluations, and who had refrained from criticizing the DOJ about their surprise dismissals, and that personal explanation was not forthcoming from the Department justifying their dismissals."

As Legal Times explained: "McNulty's testimony angered three key constituencies in the scandal: the attorney general, Congress, and the fired U.S. attorneys. Gonzales, it would later emerge, was upset that McNulty had essentially disclosed the involvement of the White House in the firing of H.E. "Bud" Cummins III, the U.S. attorney in Arkansas. And members of Congress would note that, in testifying that Cummins had been fired to make way for an acolyte of White House political adviser Karl Rove, McNulty was contradicting an earlier assertion by Gonzales that the firings hadn't been motivated by political reasons.'...It also spurred most of the fired prosecutors to publicly defend themselves...."

Cumins was removed "to make room for Tim Griffin, a Karl Rove protégé who had headed the opposition-research operation at the Republican National Committee. Gonzales was upset, his former chief of staff Kyle Sampson has told congressional investigators, that McNulty's revelation put "in the public sphere" the uncomfortable fact that the White House helped engineer the dismissal."

On March 13, Attorney General Alberto Gonzales conceded that McNulty's testimony was inaccurate, "incomplete information was communicated or may have been communicated to Congress."

Senator Charles Schumer said he was told by Justice Department officials that Carol Lam and others were terminated because of "performance-related," but Schumer said, Deputy Attorney General Paul McNulty later "called me on the phone and said, 'I am sorry that I didn't tell you the truth."'

McNulty, in turn, was said to be angry at being kept out of the loop, and for being misled, telling congressional investigators in private testimony to Congress on April 27, 2007, that "Kyle Sampson, then Gonzales's chief of staff, and Monica M. Goodling, then the department's White House liaison, did not brief him fully before his testimony."

On May 14, McNulty announced his resignation, which took effect July 26, 2007.

On May 28, 2007, Monica Goodling, the Department's White House liaison, was summoned under a limited grant of immunity to testify before the House Judiciary Committee, where she was quick to refute McNulty's earlier charges against her by stating that, in fact, it was McNulty who "had not been fully candid" about the 2006 U.S. Attorney firings.

Legal offices
Preceded by James B. Comey	U.S. Deputy Attorney General; Served under: George W. Bush; 2005–2007	Succeeded by Craig S. Morford (acting)
Academic offices
Preceded by Richard G. Jewell	9th President of Grove City College; 2014–present	Incumbent
