= Monica Goodling =

American lawyer

Monica Marie Goodling (born August 6, 1973) is an American lawyer who formerly served as a political appointee in the George W. Bush administration, best known for her role in the 2006 dismissal of U.S. attorneys controversy. As Principal Deputy Director of Public Affairs for the United States Department of Justice, she illegally hired and fired U.S. attorneys based on their political beliefs. However, Goodling was granted prosecutorial immunity in exchange for her testimony. The Virginia State Bar publicly reprimanded Goodling in May 2011 for having "improperly utilized political affiliation and other political considerations when making hiring decisions for career positions."

== Education ==
Goodling is a 1991 graduate of Northeastern High School in Manchester, Pennsylvania, and received her Bachelor of Arts degree in 1995 from Messiah College. After completing her bachelor's degree, Goodling started her legal education at American University. Deeply religious and politically conservative, she later transferred to Pat Robertson's Regent University School of Law, where she received her Juris Doctor degree in 1999.

== Political and legal career ==
Goodling worked with Tim Griffin as an opposition researcher for the Republican National Committee during the 2000 presidential campaign. She joined the Department of Justice's press office after George W. Bush became president. She moved to the department's executive office, which is responsible for budgeting, management, personnel management and evaluation, later becoming deputy director of the executive office. Goodling was hired by U.S. Attorney Mary Beth Buchanan to work in the executive office.

Less than a year later, Goodling moved again, to the Attorney General’s office, working as the White House liaison. According to David Ayres, senior chief of staff to Attorney General John Ashcroft, "She was the embodiment of a hardworking young conservative who believed strongly in the president and his mission". According to Bud Cummins, one of the fired prosecutors and an Arkansas Republican, "She was inexperienced, way too naïve and a little overzealous".

After moving to the Attorney General's office, she retained some authority over personnel matters. Goodling's authority over hiring expanded significantly in March 2006, when Gonzales signed an unpublished order delegating to Goodling and Kyle Sampson, his then chief of staff, the power to appoint or dismiss all department political appointees besides United States Attorneys, who are appointed by the President. The delegation included authority over interim United States attorneys (who are appointed by the Attorney General) and heads of the divisions that handle civil rights, public corruption, environmental crimes and other matters.

== U.S. attorneys controversy ==
According to e-mails, Goodling was involved in planning controversial 2006 U.S. attorney dismissals and in later efforts to limit the negative public reaction. Goodling "warned of potential political problems with Tim Griffin's interim appointment as U.S. Attorney for the Eastern District of Arkansas and underscored White House interest in getting it done." Reportedly, Goodling "took a leading role" in Bud Cummins's dismissal.

=== Resignation ===
On March 23, 2007, she took an indefinite leave of absence. On March 26, 2007, Goodling cancelled her upcoming appearance at a Congressional hearing, citing her Fifth Amendment right against self-incrimination. No Department of Justice employee has ever exercised their Fifth Amendment rights with respect to official conduct and remained an employee. On April 6, 2007, Goodling announced her resignation from the Department of Justice, writing to Gonzales, "May God bless you richly as you continue your service to America."

=== Limited immunity to testify ===
On April 25, 2007, the House Judiciary Committee voted 32-6 to grant Goodling immunity and immediately authorized a subpoena. In early May 2007, the Department of Justice's Office of Professional Responsibility investigated whether Goodling violated federal law in making "hiring decisions on assistant U.S. attorneys based on party affiliation."

Initially, commentators speculated that Justice Department officials could try to bar Goodling's testimony to the House Committee, on the grounds that it might interfere with an ongoing criminal investigation. However, the Justice Department subsequently agreed not to contest the congressional grant of immunity.

On May 11, 2007, U.S. District Court Chief Judge Thomas F. Hogan signed an order granting Goodling immunity in exchange for her truthful testimony about the firings.

=== House Judiciary committee hearing ===
Goodling appeared before the House Judiciary Committee, on May 23, 2007, and provided to the committee a written statement that she read at the start of her testimony.

In response to questions during the hearing, Goodling stated that she "crossed the line" and broke civil service rules about hiring, and improperly weighed political factors in considering applicants for career positions at the Department of Justice. Link to Washington Post transcript of the hearing.

=== Investigation of Goodling's hiring practices ===
On May 3, 2007, the Washington Post reported that the United States Department of Justice Office of the Inspector General launched an internal probe into whether Goodling "illegally took party affiliation into account in hiring career federal prosecutors" in her work at the Department.

On May 12, the New York Times published an article about Goodling repeatedly engaging in "prohibited personnel practices" while at the Justice Department. Several Justice Department officials told Robin Ashton, a criminal prosecutor at the Department of Justice, that "you have a Monica problem." Ashton was told that Goodling "believes you're a Democrat and doesn't feel you can be trusted." Ashton was denied a promotion during Goodling's tenure, but in the Obama administration, Attorney General Eric Holder determined that she was qualified and appointed her as Counsel for Professional Responsibility, the head of the Justice Department's internal ethics unit.

One week after Goodling's testimony before the House, the Department's Office of the Inspector General and Counsel for the Office of Professional Responsibility confirmed in a letter to the Senate Judiciary Committee, that they were expanding their investigation beyond "the removals of United States Attorneys" to also include "DOJ hiring and personnel decisions" by Goodling and other Justice Department employees.

On July 28, 2008, a Justice Department report concluded that Goodling had violated federal law and Justice Department policy by discriminating against job applicants who were not Republican or conservative loyalists. "Goodling improperly subjected candidates for certain career positions to the same politically based evaluation she used on candidates for political positions," the report concluded. In one instance, Justice investigators found, Goodling initially objected to hiring an assistant prosecutor in Washington because "judging from his resume, he appeared to be a liberal Democrat type." In another, she rejected an experienced terrorism prosecutor to work on counterterrorism issues at a Justice Department headquarters office "because of his wife's political affiliations."

== Role in other DOJ controversies ==
On May 7, 2007, National Journal's "Inside Washington" column reported that it was Goodling who ordered drapes to be placed over the partially nude Art Deco statues (Spirit of Justice) in the Justice Department's Great Hall during Ashcroft's tenure as Attorney General. At the time, the department spent $8,000 on blue drapes to hide the two giant, aluminum statues, according to DOJ spokeswoman Barbara Comstock. The coverings were removed in 2005.

On July 15, 2009, Washington Blade's "The Latest" column reported that it was Goodling who asked Michael Elston to lead a 2006 screening committee for the Justice Department Summer Internship Program. The column goes on to describe an evaluation of apparent discriminatory application process similar to the 2007 attempts to remove Department attorneys based on non-qualifying criteria. The research shows that under Goodling/Elston, 82% of applicants with liberal affiliations on their resume were rejected for the program while only 13% of applicants with conservative affiliations were rejected.

== Current status ==
Goodling married Michael Krempasky, co-founder of RedState. She is currently employed under her married name, Monica Krempasky, at Corallo Media Strategies, a Virginia public relations firm run by former John Ashcroft spokesman Mark Corallo.
