= Carol Lam =

American lawyer

Carol C. Lam
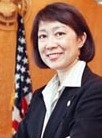

United States Attorney for the Southern District of California
- In office September 4, 2002 – February 15, 2007

Personal details
- Born: Carol Chien-Hua Lam; June 26, 1959 (age 65)
- Spouse: Mark Steven Burnett
- Education: Yale University (BA); Stanford University (JD)

Carol Chien-Hua Lam (Chinese: 林剑华; pinyin: Lín Jiànhuá; born June 26, 1959) is a former United States attorney for the Southern District of California. Lam was sworn into office on an interim basis on September 4, 2002. On November 12, 2002, Lam was further sworn in as a Senate confirmed presidential appointee. She oversaw the Rep. Randy "Duke" Cunningham military contracting corruption case. Lam was one of eight attorneys fired in the dismissal of U.S. attorneys controversy.

== Education ==
Lam received her B.A. from Yale University with a degree in philosophy. She received her J.D. from Stanford Law School in 1985.

== Career ==
Lam began her legal career as a law clerk to the Honorable Irving R. Kaufman of the United States Court of Appeals for the Second Circuit from 1985 to 1986.

From 1986 to 1997, she served as an Assistant U.S. Attorney in the Southern District of California and was Chief of the Major Frauds Section from 1997 to 2000. Lam convicted several high-ranking members of the Chicago organized crime family La Cosa Nostra; obtained a guilty plea and a civil settlement of $110 million from National Health Laboratories, Inc. in a Medicare fraud case; and briefed and argued the first appellate case upholding the constitutionality of "roving" wiretaps.

She then served as a judge of the Superior Court in San Diego, presiding over a criminal trial calendar.

In 2002, Lam was appointed U.S. Attorney for the Southern District of California by George W. Bush. In 2007, Lam was asked to resign by the Bush administration. Subsequent to the dismissal, the administration claimed that Lam did not allocate sufficient resources to prosecuting border crimes, echoing US Representative Darrell Issa's (R-CA) complaints.

On February 26, 2007, Lam joined Qualcomm as Senior Vice President and Legal Counsel for the Company’s Legal Team. On August 13, 2007, Lam took the role of acting general counsel at Qualcomm while "a nationwide executive search" was begun for a permanent replacement for Lou Lupin, who resigned as general counsel just after the finding by Hon. Rudi M. Brewster, United States Senior District Court Judge, that Qualcomm and its counsel engaged in egregious legal misconduct. While the inception of Qualcomm and its counsel's misconduct predated the hiring of Ms. Lam, there has been no public statement as to whether her hiring was predicated on the emergence of the scandal.

In November 2008, Lam was named as Deputy General Counsel for Qualcomm.

== U.S. Attorney ==
=== Healthcare fraud ===
Lam was an expert in prosecuting healthcare fraud, having authored a 954-page textbook on the subject. As U.S. Attorney, Lam took an interest in the case of San Diego's Alvarado Hospital Medical Center, which was owned by Tenet Healthcare Corporation, the nation's second-largest hospital chain. In 2002, government agents raided the hospital. In June 2003, the hospital's chief executive, Barry Weinbaum, was indicted on one count of conspiring to violate the federal anti-kickback statute and seven counts of offering and paying illegal remuneration. The hospital and a Tenet unit were indicted a month later. On February 17, 2005, a mistrial was declared when the jury failed to reach a verdict. Lam personally prosecuted the case in a second trial; after seven months in the courtroom and a record of four months of jury deliberation, the judge declared another mistrial on April 4, 2006.

Tenet settled. Denying that it paid kickbacks to doctors for referrals of patients to Alvarado, Tenet paid $21 million to the government, agreed to sell Alvarado Hospital and admitted that the case has led to "significant reforms" at hospitals around the country and that the company had been "distressed" to learn of "excessive payments" to some doctors.

=== Anti-corruption activity ===
Attorneys on Lam's staff, including Assistant United States Attorneys Jason Forge, Phillip Halpern and Valerie Chu, secured indictments against Central Intelligence Agency official Kyle "Dusty" Foggo and contractor Brent R. Wilkes. Wilkes figured in the Cunningham scandal.

The New York Times, citing unnamed sources, has reported that Lam was investigating Republican Congressman Jerry Lewis at the time of her dismissal. The Los Angeles Times, House Democratic Caucus Chairman Rahm Emanuel and Senator Chuck Schumer, and others, asserted that Lam was investigating Jerry Lewis, suggesting that her firing by the Bush administration was politically motivated. However, The Washington Post and other news organizations reported that the investigation into Lewis was being run out of the U.S. Attorney's office in Los Angeles in coordination with the Los Angeles FBI field office.

In January 2006, Lam announced the indictment of San Diego Gas & Electric on five counts of environmental crimes regarding mishandled asbestos removal during the decommissioning of the Encanto Gas Holder site in Lemon Grove, California. A conviction as to some counts was reached by a jury after trial.

In December 2006, an attorney on Lam's staff, Assistant United States Attorney Christopher Alexander, convicted the Golden State Fence Company of Riverside, CA, and two of its executives, of hiring illegal immigrants. The Golden State Fence Company (a.k.a. Fenceworks, Inc.), was one of the contractors hired by the U.S. government to build the southern U.S. border fence. Mel Kay, founder, chairman and president of Golden State Fence Co., and manager Michael McLaughlin were sentenced to serve three years of probation and perform 1040 hours of community service. Kay was fined $200,000 for his involvement in the crime and McLaughlin was fined $100,000. Golden State was ordered to forfeit $4.7 million of illegal profits generated from hiring the illegal workers.

=== Key event timeline of the firing scandal ===
- June 2003 – Barry Weinbaum, CEO Alvarado Hospital (owned by Tenet), indicted for conspiracy to violate the federal statutes.
- October 2004 – Leonard Senerote, Michael Uhl and Michael Snipes dismissed on No TX USA office.
- February 2005 – Lam's name first appears on a firings list.
- March 2005 – Leonard Leo e-mail.
- October 2005 – 18 Republican lawmakers criticize Lam's handling of immigration cases (letter signed by Cunningham while under investigation).
- March 2006 – Bush signs the USA Patriot Improvement and Reauthorization Act.
- April 2006 – Second mistrial in Lam's illegal-kickback trial of Alvarado execs.
- May 5, 2006 – CIA director Porter Goss resigns unexpectedly.
- May 10, 2006 – Lam notifies DoJ she planned to serve search warrants on Kyle Foggo, who resigned two days earlier as No. 3 official at the CIA.
- May 10, 2006 – HHS announces forthcoming termination of Medicare payments to Alvarado/Tenet.
- May 11, 2006 – Kyle Sampson e-mails deputy White House counsel William Kelley, re "the real problem we have right now with Carol Lam ....
- May 11, 2006 – Los Angeles Times reports Cunningham probe expanded to House Appropriations Chair Jerry Lewis (R-CA).
- May 12, 2006 – FBI agents seizes records from Foggo's CIA offices and his suburban Vienna, Va.
- May 17, 2006 – Tenet Healthcare Agrees to Divest Alvarado Hospital. Tenet will not lose Medicare money, civil settlement with the federal government.
- May 18, 2006 – Rep. Darrell Issa (R-CA) provides false information to AP that Lam has prosecuted only 6% of 289 suspected immigrant smugglers.
- July 31, 2006 – The Times quotes Prakash Sethi "GPOs extract extra profits of $5 billion to $6 billion" illegitimately.
- December 7, 2006 – Michael Battle, director of the Executive Office for U.S. Attorneys, calls seven U.S. Attorneys to ask for their resignations.
- December 13, 2006 – AAG McNulty curbs USA's prosecutorial powers, centralizes corporate fraud charging decision making.
- February 15, 2007 – Lam resigns as U.S. Attorney for San Diego just days after filing indictments in public corruption case.

=== Forced resignation ===
On December 7, 2006, Michael A. Battle, director of the Executive Office for US Attorneys, called Lam and notified her that she must resign no later than January 31, 2007. Battle instructed Lam to explain that she had decided to pursue other opportunities. Following that phone call, Lam called Deputy Attorney General Paul McNulty to find out why she was being asked to resign. McNulty said he wanted to take some time to respond since he didn't want to give an answer "that would lead" Lam down the wrong path. McNulty added that he knew Lam had been through a long trial (presumably the Alvarado Hospital case) and had great respect for her.

In a follow-up call with Battle, Lam requested additional time to ensure an orderly transition from office. On January 5, 2007, Battle said her request was "not being received positively" and that Lam "should stop thinking in terms of the cases in the office". Battle insisted that Lam had to depart in weeks, not months, and these orders were "coming from the very highest levels of government". Lam submitted her resignation January 16, 2007, effective February 15.

Many prominent Democrats, including Senators Charles Schumer and Dianne Feinstein, allege that Lam's firing was part of a broader, vengeful move against prosecutors that have pursued political corruption cases that damaged the careers of Republican politicians, or that were not loyal enough to either the Republican Party or the administration. Republican Congressman Darrell Issa has stated that he takes "maybe one-twentieth" of the responsibility for Lam's firing.

Statistics compiled by Lam's office corroborate the assertion that total prosecutions in border crossing cases have declined over Lam's tenure.

However, the Justice Department itself defended Lam in an August 23, 2006, letter to Senator Feinstein. They asserted:

The immigration philosophy of the Southern District focuses on deterrence by directing its resources and efforts against the worst immigration offenders and by bringing felony cases against such defendants that will result in longer sentences. For example, although the number of defendants who received prison sentences between 1–12 months fell from 896 in 2004 to 338 in 2005, the number of immigration defendants who received sentences longer than 60 months rose from 21 to 77. Prosecutions for alien smuggling in the Southern District under U.S.C. sec. 1324 are rising sharply in Fiscal Year 2006.

In her own defense, Lam echoed the Justice Department's August letter, emphasizing quality prosecutions over sheer quantity. "When you take on more difficult investigations, the number of prosecutions might not be as high, but you have a larger impact on crime in the community." During her tenure as U.S. Attorney, Lam received both the Director's Award for Superior Performance and the Attorney General's Award for Distinguished Service.

United States Senator Orrin Hatch of Utah, a Republican member of the U.S. Senate Judiciary Committee, stated on his April 1, 2007, appearance on NBC's Meet the Press broadcast:

Carol Lam, it's amazing to me she wasn't fired earlier because for three years, members of the Congress had complained that there had been all kinds of border patrol captures of these people, but hardly any prosecutions. She was a former law professor, with no prosecutorial experience, and the former campaign manager in Southern California for Clinton, and they're trying to say that this administration appoints people politically? Of course they do.

Senator Hatch's description of Lam, however, was inaccurate; Lam was never a campaign manager for any candidate, nor a law professor, and she is an experienced prosecutor. After a week of controversy, Hatch wrote a letter to Tim Russert claiming that he "mispoke" in naming Lam several times, intending instead to name Alan Bersin, Lam's predecessor; however, Bersin likewise had never been a law professor and was an experienced trial lawyer.

== Later career ==
When she left the U.S. Attorney's position in February 2007, she accepted the position of senior vice president and legal counsel for Qualcomm.

She was named Attorney of the Year by the San Diego County Bar Association in February 2007. Los Angeles Daily Journal named to the list of "Top 75 Women Litigators".

Lam has been frequently mentioned as a potential nominee for the Supreme Court of the United States by observers of Barack Obama's administration.

== Personal ==
Lam is the daughter of Mr. and Mrs. Sau-Wing Lam of Tenafly, New Jersey. She married Mark Steven Burnett, a geophysicist specializing in oceanography, on August 23, 1986.
