= William Moschella =

American lawyer and associate deputy attorney general

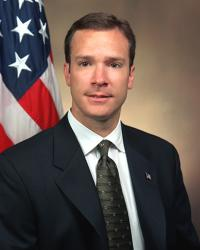

United States Assistant Attorney General for the Office of Legislative Affairs
- In office May 2003 – October 2006
- President: George W. Bush
- Attorney General: John Ashcroft; Alberto Gonzales
- Preceded by: Daniel J. Bryant
- Succeeded by: James H. Clinger (acting)

Personal details
- Born: William Emil Moschella; April 17, 1968 (age 58) Knoxville, Tennessee
- Spouse: Amy H. Rouleau
- Education: University of Virginia (B.A.); George Mason University School of Law (J.D.)

William Emil Moschella (born April 17, 1968) is an American lawyer and former associate deputy attorney general.

== Career ==
Moschella received a bachelor's degree from the University of Virginia in 1990. Following graduation, he spent seven years in a variety of positions in the office of Congressman Frank R. Wolf (R-Va.), while attending George Mason University Law School in the evenings. From 1997 to 2003, he held a number of positions on Capitol Hill, including serving as counsel to the House Committee on Government Reform, general counsel to the House Committee on Rules, chief investigative counsel to the House Committee on the Judiciary from 1999 to 2001, and chief legislative counsel and parliamentarian to the House Committee on the Judiciary. In 2003, he was nominated by President George W. Bush to serve as United States Assistant Attorney General for Legislative Affairs, and he was approved by the Senate on May 9, 2003.

On October 2, 2006, Moschella was named principal associate deputy attorney general succeeding William W. Mercer, who was nominated in early September to serve as associate attorney general.

== Controversies ==
Moschella was directly involved in making changes to the Patriot Act that allowed interim US attorneys to serve indefinitely.

On March 6, 2007, Moschella testified to the House Judiciary Committee that all the US attorneys were fired for performance-related reasons, although he acknowledged that none of the attorneys were originally told why they had been fired. He also testified that the White House had no involvement in the firings of US attorneys, testimony that was later shown to be incorrect by emails that were subsequently released.

However, the inspector general (IG) of the Department of Justice, after an exhaustive investigation, found that "Moschella did not know that his testimony . . . was inaccurate. Moschella only reiterated publicly what he had been told about these issues and what [Deputy Attorney General] McNulty had previously told the Senate Judiciary Committee." The IG stated on page 356 of its report: "Under these circumstances, we concluded that Moschella's inaccurate testimony was not his fault and that he should not be criticized for it."
