= Bud Cummins =

American lawyer

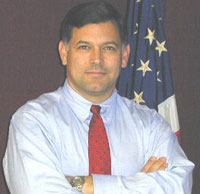

United States Attorney for the Eastern District of Arkansas
- In office December 20, 2001 – December 20, 2006
- President: George W. Bush
- Preceded by: Paula Casey
- Succeeded by: Tim Griffin

Personal details
- Born: August 6, 1959 (age 67) Enid, Oklahoma, U.S.
- Spouse: Jody A. Cummins
- Education: University of Arkansas (BSBA, JD)
- Occupation: Lawyer

Harry Earnest Cummins, III, known as Bud Cummins (born August 6, 1959), is an American attorney, businessman and politician. He served as United States Attorney with five years of service from 2001 to 2006 in the United States District Court for the Eastern District of Arkansas.

== Career ==
Cummins was born in Enid, Oklahoma. He graduated from the University of Arkansas and eventually moved to Little Rock, Arkansas where he obtained a J.D. degree from the University of Arkansas at Little Rock William H. Bowen School of Law. Subsequently, he served as a federal law clerk for United States Magistrate Judge John F. Forster, and later for chief United States District Judge Stephen M. Reasoner. After his federal clerkships, he set up a private law practice.

In 1996, he ran as a Republican candidate for Arkansas' second district in the House of Representatives. He lost 52 percent to 48 percent to Democrat Vic Snyder. He later served as Governor Mike Huckabee's chief legal counsel. In 2000, he was an elector representing Arkansas' second electoral district at the Electoral College and cast his vote for Texas Governor George W. Bush. In 2001, shortly after becoming President of the United States, Bush nominated Cummins to be the United States Attorney for the Eastern District of Arkansas, a position that he held until 2006. During his tenure as U.S. Attorney, his office successfully investigated and prosecuted several high-profile cases including the conviction of a group responsible for the largest theft of electronic personal identity data up to that time.

After leaving the U.S. Attorney's Office, Cummins re-entered private practice, specializing in white-collar criminal matters, complex multi-party litigation, and compliance.

Cummins currently practices as a lawyer, a lobbyist, and a mediator. He has represented DOJ white collar targets in the U.S. or international clients targeted by DOJ or the Treasury Department.

In 2015, Cummins agreed to serve as the Arkansas chairman for the presidential campaign of New Jersey Governor Chris Christie. Cummins and Christie served together as U.S. Attorneys during the George W. Bush administration. After Christie withdrew from the 2016 presidential primary race, Cummins subsequently agreed to serve as Arkansas chairman of Donald Trump's presidential campaign.

Cummins also served as a Trump whip at the Republican National Convention, held in Cleveland in July 2016. In September 2016, Cummins temporarily relocated to Washington, D.C. to serve on the Trump presidential transition team.

From 2017 through 2020, Cummins was affiliated with the Washington D.C. lobbying firm Avenue Strategies.

== Controversy over dismissal ==
Cummins received national attention when he was dismissed by United States Attorney General Alberto Gonzales despite having received positive job reviews.

Cummins was informed in June 2006 that his resignation would be desired. His replacement was Tim Griffin who had worked for Cummins' office as a special assistant United States attorney since September 2006 onward. Cummins resigned effective December 20, 2006. At the time he was referred to as "one of the most distinguished lawyers in Arkansas".

Early in the congressional investigations of the firings, Deputy Attorney General Paul McNulty testified that Cummins was removed for no reason except to install a former aide to Karl Rove: 37-year-old Tim Griffin, a former opposition research director for the Republican National Committee.

Ultimately, after hearings in both the House and Senate Judiciary Committees and an investigation by the Office of Inspector General it was determined that a total of nine U.S. Attorneys had been fired.

Though U.S. Attorneys serve at the pleasure of the President, it was highly unusual for a President to remove his own appointee absent some evidence of wrongdoing or underperformance. As to Cummins and six other discharged U.S. Attorneys, there was no such evidence. Michael Battle, the director of EOUSA at the time of Cummins's removal, reported to the Office of Inspector General "an extremely positive" view of Cummins's service as U.S. Attorney. Battle said that he was not aware of any problems or dissatisfaction within the Department concerning Cummins's performance, and Battle added that "he considered Cummins's to be one of the top five U.S. Attorneys of the country."

== Role in Biden–Ukraine allegations ==
On November 24, 2019, Cummins' name came to light in relation to the Biden–Ukraine conspiracy theory. In response to inquiries from reporters with Talking Points Memo and ABC News, Cummins confirmed that as early as October 2018 that he had acted "as an intermediary between certain Ukrainian interests and federal law enforcement." Cummins had been asked to confidentially convey an offer by Ukrainian prosecutor general Yuriy Lutsenko to meet with "high level" U.S. law enforcement authorities to present evidence of corruption by Joe Biden and his son, Hunter. Lutsenko later worked with President Donald Trump's personal attorney Rudy Giuliani to press for a Ukrainian investigation of Hunter Biden. Cummins said he "knew precious little about Ukrainian politics at that stage," and that Lutsenko "may or may not be a credible guy." His role emerged in a letter from Rudy Giuliani to senator Lindsey Graham. Although Giuliani did not name him, Cummins confirmed that he was the former U.S. attorney referenced in the letter. Cummins noted that, in his communication with Geoffrey Berman, the US attorney for Manhattan, he said he could not vouch for the veracity of the Ukrainian information but was passing it along as a matter he considered appropriate for federal investigation. Cummins noted that he took no further action in this matter once Giuliani's role became public, but that he was surprised that the Department of Justice had no apparent interest in evaluating the evidence Lutsenko might provide.

== Weaponization of the Department of Justice ==
Cummins became an early and outspoken critic of the Department of Justice in DOJ's approach to investigating Donald Trump. He made numerous television appearances criticizing the Department of Justice, James Comey, Andrew McCabe, and Peter Strzok. Cummins was amongst the few officials who criticized the department's conduct throughout the Mueller Russian Collusion investigation, and the impeachment of President Trump.

== ATF killing of Bryan Malinowski ==
Bryan Malinowski was the Director of the Little Rock Airport where he his base salary was close to $264,000. As a hobby, he enjoyed attending gun shows where he would display his coin and gun collections, chat with entrants and other vendors, and occasionally buy, sell or trade guns or coins. Under federal law, private citizens are permitted to buy and sell firearms without conducting background checks if they are hobbyists or collectors. They are not required to obtain a Federal Firearms license under the same regulatory framework as commercial firearms dealers.

The Bureau of Alcohol, Tobacco, Firearms and Explosives (ATF) unilaterally decided Bryan Malinowski had crossed the subjective line between a private seller or hobbyist to a person engaged in the business of selling firearms, but they gave him no notice of that decision. ATF opened a criminal investigation and subsequently served a search warrant at the Malinowski home on March 19, 2024. Agents armed with tactical gear forcibly entered the Malinowski home by breaching the door with a battering ram at 6:00 a.m. Hearing no knocking or announcements identifying the intruders as police, and believing he and his wife were victims of home invaders, Malinowski arose from bed, obtained a pistol, and moved to the dark entry hallway where he confronted two armed intruders at a distance of 20 or 30 feet. He fired shots at the feet of the intruders. One ATF agent immediately returned fire and fatally wounded Malinowski in the forehead.

Cummins immediately began an investigation into the matter on behalf of the family and on May 22, 2024, Cummins testified about Malinowski's death in front of the House Judiciary Committee Select Subcommittee on the Weaponization of the Federal Government.
