= Kyle Sampson =

American attorney

D. Kyle Sampson (born in Cedar City, Utah) was the chief of staff and counselor of United States attorney general Alberto Gonzales. He resigned on March 12, 2007, amid the controversy surrounding the firing of eight United States attorneys in 2006 and was cleared of any criminal wrongdoing in July 2010. In October 2007, Sampson joined the law firm of Hunton & Williams LLP as a partner in the firm's food and drug practice, where his practice focuses on FDA regulatory and enforcement matters.

== Early career ==
As a young man, Sampson served a mission for the Church of Jesus Christ of Latter-day Saints among Hmong refugees who had emigrated from Laos to Minnesota. After graduating from Brigham Young University in 1993, Sampson earned a JD with honors from the University of Chicago Law School in 1996, serving as articles editor on the school's law review. He clerked for Judge Karen J. Williams of the U.S. Court of Appeals for the Fourth Circuit and then joined the Salt Lake City law firm of Parr Waddoups Brown Gee & Loveless.

== Government service ==
From 1999 to 2001 Sampson served as counsel to Senator Orrin G. Hatch (R-Utah) on the Senate Judiciary Committee. After the 2000 election, Sampson "drew on a friendship he had built in law school with Elizabeth Cheney, the daughter of the vice president, to land a job making personnel decisions in the early days of the Bush administration." Later, he worked under Alberto Gonzales as associate counsel to the president. From there, he served as special assistant U.S. Attorney in the Eastern District of Virginia, and then, in 2003, became counselor to then-attorney general John Ashcroft. In 2005, he was promoted to be chief of staff and counselor to Attorney General Alberto Gonzales (who was sworn in as attorney general on February 14, 2005). Sampson was "a trusted political advisor" to both Ashcroft and Gonzales.

In 2006, Sampson was a candidate for appointment to be the U.S. Attorney for the District of Utah.

White House and Justice officials backed Mr. Sampson in his bid to replace [Paul] Warner, making that clear to the staff of Senator Hatch. But the senator wanted Mr. Bush to nominate Brett Tolman, a one-time Utah federal prosecutor who had spent the previous three years working on antiterrorism issues for the Judiciary Committee staff. . . . Mr. Hatch finally made a personal appeal to Mr. Gonzales to drop his bid to nominate Mr. Sampson. After a four-month delay, President Bush nominated Tolman for the position in June 2006.

== The U.S. attorneys dismissal controversy ==
Sampson and Harriet Miers created a list of U.S. attorneys to be fired, as shown by emails produced for a congressional investigation, and Sampson coordinated the execution of the plan. "Miers had pushed to fire them all," and administration officials "were determined to dismiss those they considered the weakest performers." Sampson, "at the behest of the White House," conducted "a review to determine which of the ninety-three U.S. attorneys around the country should be let go." "Sampson had good political instincts, having worked on Capitol Hill for Senator Orrin Hatch before moving to the White House counsel's office to work for Gonzales." Sampson wrote in an email to Miers that he was

Concerned that to execute this plan properly we must all be on the same page and be steeled to withstand any political upheaval that might result. If we start caving to complaining US Attorneys or Senators then we shouldn't do it—it'll be more trouble than it's worth. We'll stand by for a green light from you."

Sampson resigned after Alberto Gonzales—under pressure from Congress—agreed that the Justice Department would turn those emails over to Congress and would make department staff, including Sampson, available to testify about the firings. Sampson "was seen within the Justice Department as a workaholic chief of staff who managed to keep things moving for Gonzales. When Sampson resigned . . . Gonzales was left . . . rudderless."

According to one commentator, "Had Republicans still been in power, there would have been no controversy, no investigation." After all, "United States attorneys are political appointees who serve at the pleasure of the president, and during changeovers in administration, they are replaced as a matter of standard practice." But in 2007, Republicans were no longer in power.

As a result of the dismissal of the eight U.S. attorneys, many senators called on Attorney General Alberto Gonzales to resign as well. Senator Charles E. Schumer, the first senator to call for Gonzales's resignation, believes Gonzales should have resigned, not Sampson. According to Schumer, "it raises the temperature. Kyle Sampson will not become the . . . fall guy." The New York Times reported that "Mr. Gonzales, who approved the idea of the group firing, has been under fierce criticism from lawmakers of both parties over the dismissals, which have provoked charges that they were politically motivated." Gonzales resigned on September 17, 2007.

On July 21, 2010, Nora Dannehy, the special prosecutor tasked with investigating the attorney dismissals, concluded that "there was insufficient evidence to establish that persons knowingly made material false statements to [the Office of Inspector General] or Congress or corruptly endeavored to obstruct justice" and that no criminal charges would be filed against Sampson or Gonzales.
