= Sodi =

Sodi may refer to:

== People ==
- Sodi family, Mexican political family
- Demetrio Sodi Guergué (1866–1934), Mexican journalist, writer, jurist and politician
- Bosco Sodi (born 1970), Mexican artist
- Camila Sodi (born 1986), Mexican singer, actress and model

== Other uses ==
- Sodi (Bible), a minor Old Testament figure
- Tara Sodi, a Holby City character
- I Sodi, an Italian restaurant in New York City
