= Carlos Sodi Candiani =

Mexican politician and landowner

Senator of the Congress of the Union for Michoacán

Senator of the Congress of the Union for Oaxaca
- In office 1882–1884

Personal details
- Born: Carlos Esteban Ignacio María del Corazón de Jesús Sodi Candiani; 1838 Oaxaca City, Oaxaca, Mexico
- Died: 1909 (aged 70–71) Oaxaca City, Oaxaca, Mexico
- Children: 22, including: Demetrio; Federico; Alfredo
- Relatives: Sodi family
- Education: Institute of Sciences and Arts of Oaxaca

Carlos Esteban Ignacio María del Corazón de Jesús Sodi Candiani (Spanish pronunciation: [ˈsoði kanˈdjani]; 1838–1909) was a Mexican politician, lawyer and landowner who served as Senator of the Congress of the Union for the states of Oaxaca from 1882 to 1884 and Michoacán for approximately 25 years. A prominent landowner in Oaxaca, he co-owned several estates alongside his brother, Demetrio Sodi.

== Early life and education ==
Carlos Esteban Ignacio María del Corazón de Jesús Sodi Candiani was born in 1838, in Oaxaca City, Oaxaca. He was the son of Italian engineer and lieutenant coronel Carlos Sodi Bartoloni, who immigrated from Florence in the 19th century, and María del Carmen Camila Nepomucena Candiani Gutierrez Griz.

Sodi enrolled at the Institute of Sciences and Arts of Oaxaca between the decades of 1850 and 1860. In 1867, his participation as synodal in the Grammar exams was recorded, indicating that he was possibly a professor at the institute.

== Political career ==
During the Porfiriato, Sodi and his family owned vast tracts of land in the state of Oaxaca. He and his brother, Demetrio, were the owners of Hacienda Concepción and Hacienda Candiani and its annex, La Compañía, both located in the outskirts of Oaxaca City. The latter was dedicated to the production of sugar cane and had a land surface of 328-50-23 hectares.

Sodi served as a Senator of the Congress of the Union for the state of Oaxaca from the year 1882 to 1884, in the XI Legislature of the Mexican Congress. He also served as senator for the state of Michoacán for approximately 25 years.

== Personal life and death ==
Sodi married twice during his lifetime, his first marriage was to Dolores Guergué Antuñana y del Solar Campero, and his second to Refugio Romero Guendulain. He had a total of 22 children, including President of the Supreme Court of Justice of the Nation (1908–1910) and Secretary of Justice (March–May 1911) Demetrio Sodi Guergué, and public defender, novelist and playwright Federico Sodi Romero.

Sodi died in 1909 in Oaxaca City, Oaxaca.
