= B. Todd Jones =

American lawyer and former government official

Todd Jones
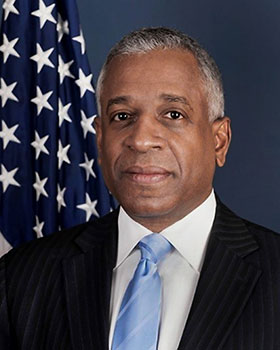

Director of the Bureau of Alcohol, Tobacco, Firearms and Explosives
- In office August 31, 2011 – March 31, 2015; Acting: August 31, 2011 – July 31, 2013
- President: Barack Obama
- Preceded by: Kenneth E. Melson (acting)
- Succeeded by: Thomas Brandon (acting)

U.S. Attorney for the District of Minnesota
- In office August 7, 2009 – August 24, 2013
- President: Barack Obama
- Preceded by: Rachel Paulose
- Succeeded by: Andrew M. Luger
- In office May 1998 – January 2001
- President: Bill Clinton
- Preceded by: David Lillehaug
- Succeeded by: Thomas Heffelfinger

Personal details
- Born: May 23, 1957 (age 69) Cincinnati, Ohio, U.S.
- Party: Democratic
- Spouse: Margaret Samanant
- Children: 5
- Education: Macalester College (BA); University of Minnesota, Twin Cities (JD)

Military service
- Allegiance: United States
- Branch/service: United States Marine Corps
- Unit: 1st Marine Division

Byron Todd Jones (born May 23, 1957) is an American lawyer who was the seventh director of the Bureau of Alcohol, Tobacco, Firearms and Explosives (ATF) and was the chief disciplinary officer of the National Football League (NFL). He twice served as United States Attorney for the District of Minnesota.

== Early life and education ==
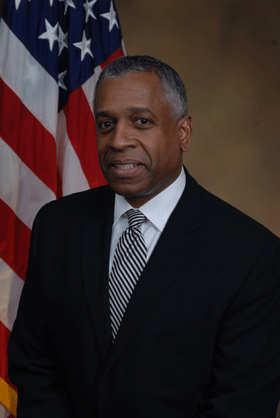
Jones' official photo as an assistant US Attorney

Jones attended Wyoming High School in Cincinnati, Ohio. He received his Bachelor of Arts degree from Macalester College in 1979 and his Juris Doctor from the University of Minnesota Law School in 1983.

== Career ==
After his schooling, Jones joined the U.S. Marine Corps and went on to serve as an infantry officer with the 1st Marine Division. Jones later became a judge advocate as both a trial defense counsel and prosecutor. He left active duty in 1989. From 1992 to 1994 and 1997 to 1998, Jones served as an assistant U.S. Attorney.

=== ATF ===
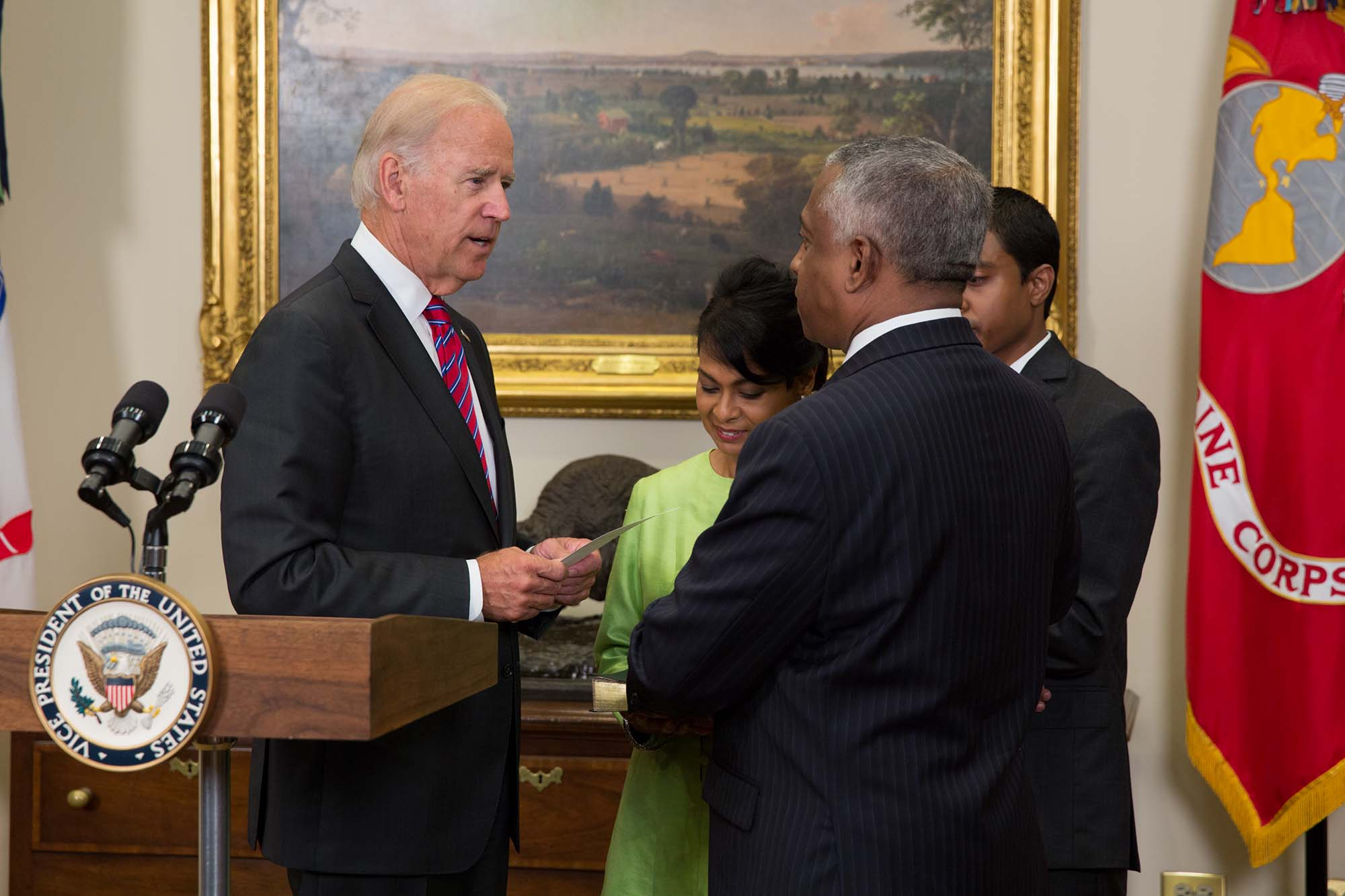
Then Vice-President Joe Biden swearing in B. Todd Jones as the Director of the Bureau of Alcohol, Tobacco, Firearms and Explosives

Jones became acting director of ATF on August 31, 2011, following the resignation of Kenneth E. Melson in the aftermath of the ATF gunwalking scandal.

On January 16, 2013, U.S. President Barack Obama nominated Jones to serve as permanent director of ATF. Due to opposition from gun rights lobbies, ATF had not had a permanent director since the position was made subject to U.S. Senate approval in 2006.

On July 31, 2013, the Senate confirmed him as head of ATF. On March 20, 2015, the Bureau of Alcohol, Tobacco, Firearms and Explosives announced Jones will depart to pursue opportunities in the private sector, with his resignation to become effective on March 31, 2015.

=== NFL ===
On March 23, 2015, NFL commissioner Roger Goodell announced to team owners that he was appointing Jones as the league's new chief disciplinary officer. Goodell announced his creation of the position in December 2014 after a series of player suspensions. The officer oversees investigation of player misconduct and any discipline that results from those investigations.
