= ATF gunwalking scandal =

US operation to capture weapons smugglers

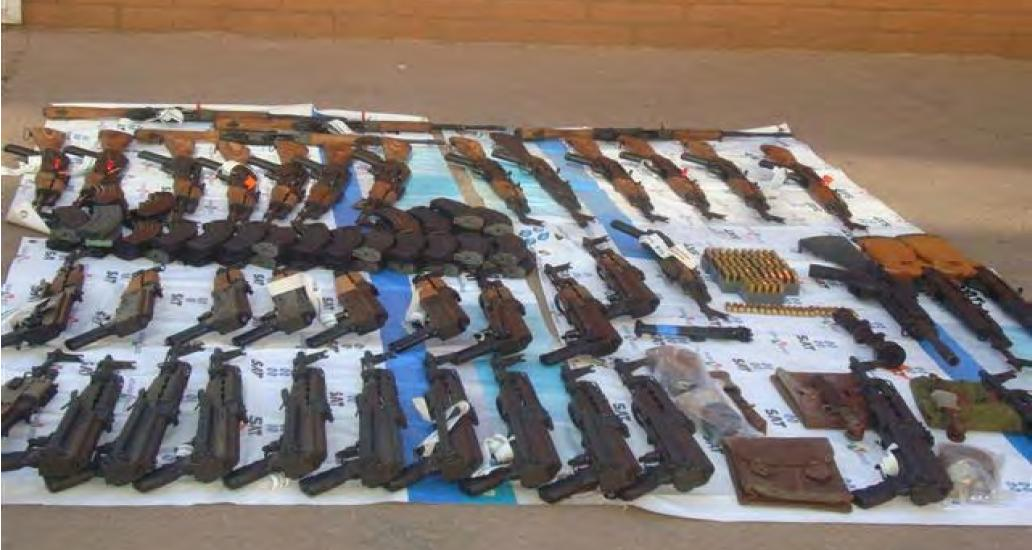
Weapons recovered by the Mexican military in Naco, Sonora, Mexico, on November 20, 2009. They include weapons bought two weeks earlier by Operation Fast and Furious suspect Uriel Patino, who bought 723 guns during the operation.

Gunwalking, or "letting guns walk", was a tactic used by the Arizona U.S. Attorney's Office and the Arizona Field Office of the United States Bureau of Alcohol, Tobacco, Firearms and Explosives (ATF), which ran a series of sting operations between 2006 and 2011 in the Tucson and Phoenix area where the ATF "purposely allowed licensed firearms dealers to sell weapons to illegal straw buyers, hoping to track the guns to Mexican drug cartel leaders and arrest them". These operations were done under the umbrella of Project Gunrunner, a project intended to stem the flow of firearms into Mexico by interdicting straw purchasers and gun traffickers within the United States. The Jacob Chambers Case began in October 2009 and eventually became known in February 2010 as Operation Fast and Furious after agents discovered Chambers and the other suspects under investigation belonged to a car club.

Each weapon was equipped with a GPS unit initially installed by the El Paso Intelligence Center, later purchased at a local electronics shop by the ATF. Critically, the GPS battery life was only a few days and the GPS weapon "tracker" signal was routinely lost, especially in car trunks. This lack of technical sophistication and failure of GPS as a tracker were the major reasons for Fast and Furious's failure as an ATF operation.

The stated goal of allowing these purchases was to continue to track the firearms as they were transferred to higher-level traffickers and key figures in Mexican cartels, with the expectation that this would lead to their arrests and the dismantling of the cartels. While federal prosecutor Emory Hurley allegedly told agents they had no choice but to let guns "walk" because agents lacked probable cause to arrest buyers, the tactic of allowing obvious straw purchasers to give guns to criminal organizations was questioned during the operations by ATF field agents and cooperating licensed gun dealers. During Operation Fast and Furious, the largest gunwalking probe, the ATF monitored the sale of about 2,000 firearms, of which only 710 were recovered as of February 2012. A number of straw purchasers have been arrested and indicted; however, as of October 2011, none of the targeted high-level cartel figures had been arrested.

Guns tracked by the ATF have been found at crime scenes on both sides of the Mexico–United States border, including the scene where United States Border Patrol agent Brian Terry was killed in December 2010. The gunwalking operations became public in the aftermath of Terry's murder. Dissenting ATF agents came forward to Congress in response. According to Humberto Benítez Treviño, former Mexican attorney general and chair of the justice committee in the Chamber of Deputies, related firearms have been found at numerous crime scenes in Mexico where at least 150 Mexican civilians were maimed or killed. Revelations of gunwalking led to controversy in both countries, and diplomatic relations were damaged.

As a result of a dispute over the release of Justice Department documents related to the scandal, on June 28, 2012, in a vote largely along party lines in a Republican-controlled House, Attorney General Eric Holder became the first sitting member of the Cabinet of the United States to be held in contempt of Congress. At Holder's request, President Barack Obama had invoked executive privilege for the first time in his presidency in order to withhold documents that "were not generated in the course of the conduct of Fast and Furious". In 2016, a federal court ruled that the records in question were not covered by privilege; a House lawsuit to try to recover the records was settled and the matter dropped in April 2019, after control of the House had shifted to Democrats.

== Background ==
One 20-year veteran of ATF's Tucson office told us that before Operation Wide Receiver, all of ATF's trafficking cases were very similar in their simplicity: ATF would get a tip from an FFL [Federal Firearms Licensee] about a buyer who wanted a large number of firearms and information about when the transaction was scheduled to take place, and would set up surveillance and arrest the buyer when he headed southbound or at the border. Sometimes the initial buyer would cooperate with ATF, and agents would arrest the actual buyer when he showed up to take possession of the guns. If the guns went to a stash house, agents would speak with subjects at the stash house or conduct a search of the stash house. This agent told us that ATF interdicted guns as a matter of course and had been "content to make the little cases," but that Wide Receiver represented a "different direction" from ATF's typical practice.

— Report by the Office of the Inspector General on the Review of ATF's Operation Fast and Furious and Related Matters, September 2012

ATF gunwalking operations were, in part, a response to longstanding criticism of the bureau for focusing on relatively minor gun violations while failing to target high-level gun smuggling figures. U.S. firearms laws currently govern the possession and transfer of firearms and provide penalties for the violation of such laws. "Gun trafficking", although not defined by statute, essentially includes the movement or diversion of firearms from legal to illegal markets. A 2009 GAO report on efforts to combat arms trafficking to Mexico notes that straw purchasing is not in itself illegal, although it is illegal to provide false information in connection with a purchase.

Four federal statutes govern U.S. commerce of firearms domestically and internationally. Many states supplement these federal statutes and have firearms laws of their own that are stricter. For example, some states require permits to obtain firearms and impose a waiting period for firearm transfers. Domestic commerce and importations into the United States are generally regulated under the National Firearms Act of 1934 (NFA) and the Gun Control Act of 1968 (GCA). The exportation of firearms from the United States is regulated by the Arms Export Control Act of 1976 and, to a lesser extent, the Export Administration Regulations (EAR).

Defendants are often prosecuted and convicted under provisions of statutes such as the GCA that make it unlawful for certain persons to be in possession of firearms, govern the transaction process of obtaining firearms (e.g., straw purchases), and contain penalties for the use of a firearm in a crime of violence or a drug trafficking crime, or penalties for knowingly or fraudulently smuggling goods that would be contrary to U.S. law and regulation.

In a 2012 case in San Juan, Texas, under existing 1968 Gun Control Act provisions on straw purchasing (Title 18 United States Code, Section 924(a)(1)(A)), straw purchaser Taisa Garcia received 33 months and buyer Marco Villalobos received 46 months, plus two years supervision after release. In another Texas gun trafficking case, Oscar Bravo Hernandez received a sentence of 84 months for buying and sending to Mexico at least 55 firearms from a ring of nine straw purchasers who received sentences from 51 months for the most involved down to three years probation for the least involved.

According to twenty-year ATF veteran Jay Wachtel, letting guns "walk" has been a practice done in a controlled manner that involved surveillance and eventual seizure of the weapons. "The idea was that you would follow it long enough until you were sure you had enough probable cause" to initiate an arrest, Wachtel said. According to ATF field agents involved in Operation Fast and Furious, a part of Project Gunrunner, "ATF agents were trained to interdict guns and prevent criminals from obtaining them" and not to allow guns to walk and then disappear. ATF agents assigned to Phoenix from other districts to work on Fast and Furious were critical of the operation.

== Operations ==
There have been allegations of gunwalking in at least 10 cities in five states. The most widely known and controversial operations took place in Arizona under the ATF's Phoenix, Arizona field division.

=== 2006–2008: Operation Wide Receiver and other probes ===
==== Operation Wide Receiver ====
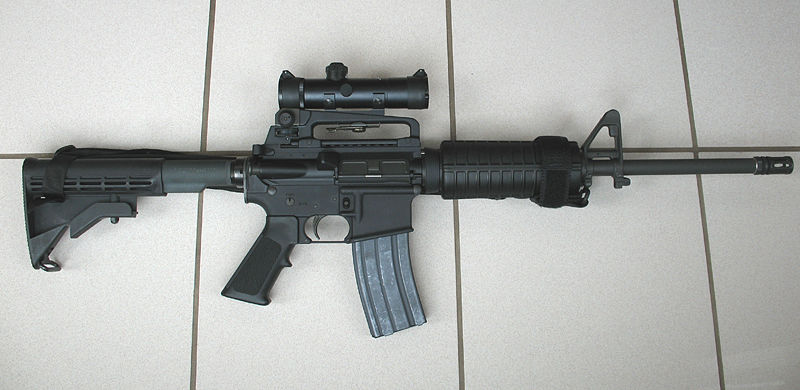
The suspicious sale of AR-15s led to Operation Wide Receiver.

The first known ATF gunwalking operation to Mexican drug cartels, named Operation Wide Receiver, began in early 2006 and ran into late 2007. Licensed dealer Mike Detty of Mad Dawg Global informed the ATF of a suspicious gun purchase that took place in February 2006, in Tucson, Arizona. In March, he was hired as a confidential informant working with the ATF's Tucson office, part of their Phoenix, Arizona field division.

With the use of surveillance equipment, ATF agents monitored additional sales by Detty to straw purchasers. With assurance from ATF "that Mexican officials would be conducting surveillance or interdictions when guns got to the other side of the border", Detty would sell a total of about 450 guns during the operation. These included semi-automatic AR-15s, semi-automatic AK-pattern rifles, and Colt .38s. The majority of the guns were eventually lost as they moved into Mexico.

As the later DOJ OIG report documented, under Wide Receiver coordination of ATF Tucson with the ATF Mexico City Office (MCO) and with Mexican law enforcement had been haphazard. Discussions of getting tracking devices from Raytheon were not followed up. ATF field agents and the cooperating gun dealer had been told by ATF supervisors that the guns were being interdicted before they could reach Mexico, but only 64 of the 474 guns had actually been seized. The kingpin sought by walking the guns, Israel Egurrola-Leon, turned out to be the target of a larger drug case Operation Iron River run by OCDETF. After Operation Wide Receiver was ended, several attorneys at the Phoenix USAO who reviewed the Wide Receiver cases for prosecution found the cases had been so poorly managed that they were reluctant to bring any of them to trial.

At the time, under the Bush administration Department of Justice (DOJ), no arrests or indictments were made. After President Barack Obama took office in 2009, the DOJ reviewed Wide Receiver and found that guns had been allowed into the hands of suspected gun traffickers. Indictments began in 2010, over three years after Wide Receiver concluded. As of October 4, 2011, nine people had been charged with making false statements in acquisition of firearms and illicit transfer, shipment or delivery of firearms. As of November, charges against one defendant had been dropped; five of them had pleaded guilty, and one had been sentenced to one year and one day in prison. Two of them remained fugitives.

==== The Hernandez case ====
Another, smaller probe occurred in 2007, under the same ATF Phoenix field division. The Fidel Hernandez case began when the ATF identified Mexican suspects who bought weapons from a Phoenix gun shop over a span of several months. The probe ultimately involved over 200 guns, a dozen of which were lost in Mexico. On September 27, 2007, ATF agents saw the original suspects buying weapons at the same store and followed them toward the Mexican border. The ATF informed the Mexican government when the suspects successfully crossed the border, but Mexican law enforcement were unable to track them.

Less than two weeks later, on October 6, William Newell, then ATF's Special Agent in Charge (SAC) of the Phoenix field division, shut down the operation at the behest of William Hoover, ATF's assistant director for the office of field operations. No charges were filed. Newell, who was Phoenix ATF SAC from June 2006 to May 2011, would later play a major role in Operation Fast and Furious.

The Hernandez case was referenced in a briefing paper prepared for Attorney General Michael Mukasey prior to his meeting with the Mexican Attorney General Medina Mora on November 16, 2007. The paper stated, "ATF has recently worked jointly with Mexico on the first-ever attempt to have a controlled delivery of weapons being smuggled into Mexico by a major arms trafficker" and that "the first attempts at this controlled delivery have not been successful". The paper also stated, "ATF would like to expand the possibility of such joint investigations and controlled deliveries—since only then will it be possible to investigate an entire smuggling network, rather than arresting simply a single smuggler."

Investigators regarded the Hernandez Case as an example of "controlled delivery" with surveillance and involvement of Mexican authorities rather than gunwalking or failure to attempt interdiction.

==== The Medrano case ====
The 2008 Alejandro Medrano case involved both ATF SAC William Newell and cooperating Tucson gun dealer Mike Detty of Operation Wide Receiver. ATF Phoenix allowed about 100 guns to be taken into Mexico over the objections of U.S. Immigration and Customs Enforcement (ICE) personnel who became aware of the case. Phoenix ATF SAC Newell acknowledged to ICE "that letting guns cross the border was part of ATF's plan". In August 2010, Medrano was sentenced to 46 months, his associate Hernan Ramos received 50 months and their fellow conspirators received prison terms from 14 to 30 months, but the target, a Sinaloa Cartel kingpin, Javier Elenes Ruiz, nicknamed "Rambo," remained untouched inside Mexico.

=== 2009–2011: Operation Fast and Furious ===
On October 26, 2009, a teleconference was held at the Department of Justice in Washington, D.C. to discuss U.S. strategy for combating Mexican drug cartels. Participating in the meeting were Deputy Attorney General David W. Ogden, Assistant Attorney General Lanny A. Breuer, acting ATF Director Kenneth E. Melson, Drug Enforcement Administration (DEA) Administrator Michele Leonhart, Director of the Federal Bureau of Investigation Robert Mueller and the top federal prosecutors in the Southwestern border states. They decided on a strategy to identify and eliminate entire arms trafficking networks rather than low-level buyers. Those at the meeting apparently did not suggest using the gunwalking tactic, but Phoenix ATF supervisors would soon use it in an attempt to achieve the desired goals.

The strategy of targeting high-level individuals, which was already ATF policy, would be implemented by Bill Newell, special agent in charge of ATF's Phoenix field division. In order to accomplish it, the office decided to monitor suspicious firearms purchases which federal prosecutor Emory Hurley claimed lacked sufficient evidence for prosecution, as laid out in a January 2010 briefing paper. This was said to be allowed under ATF regulations and given legal backing by U.S. Attorney for the District of Arizona Dennis K. Burke. It was additionally approved and funded by a Justice Department task force. However, long-standing DOJ and ATF policy has required suspected illegal arms shipments to be intercepted.

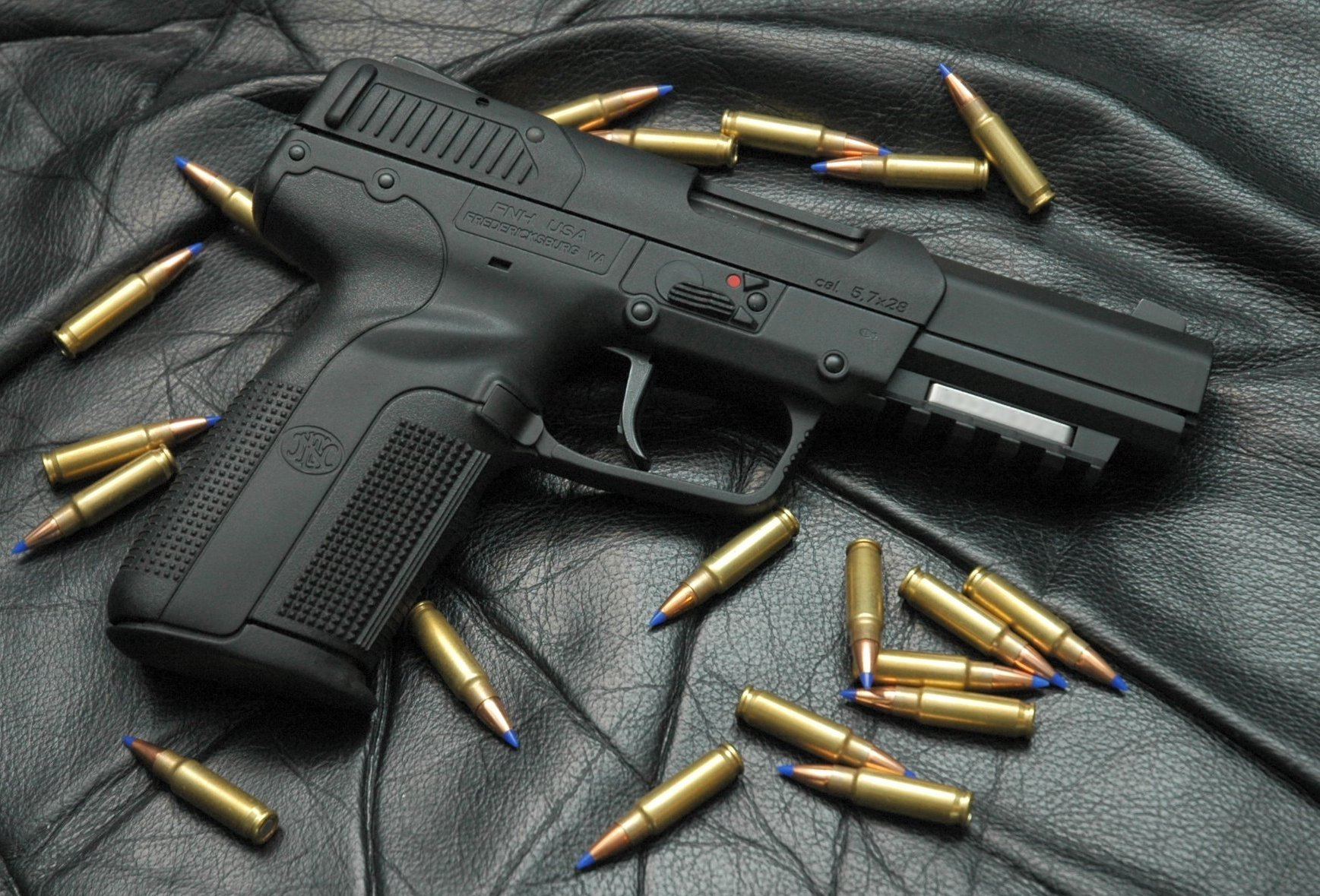
FN Five-sevens were among the weapons allowed to walk.

The operation began on October 31, 2009, when a local gun store reported to the Phoenix ATF that four individuals had purchased multiple AK-47 style rifles. In November 2009, the Phoenix office's Group VII, which would be the lead investigative group in Fast and Furious, began to follow a prolific gun trafficker. He had bought 34 firearms in 24 days, and he and his associates bought 212 more in the next month. The case soon grew to over two dozen straw purchasers, the most prolific of which would ultimately buy more than 600 weapons. The effort would come to be called Operation Fast and Furious for the successful film franchise, because some of the suspects under investigation operated out of an auto repair store and street raced.

Under the previous Operation Wide Receiver, there had been a formal ATF contract with the cooperating gun dealer and efforts were made to involve the ATF Mexico City Office (MCO) and Mexican law enforcement. Under Operation Fast and Furious, at Newell's insistence, the cooperating gun dealers did not have contracts with ATF, and MCO and Mexican police were left in the dark.

According to internal ATF documents, the operation was initially run in conjunction with the Phoenix DEA Organized Crime Drug Enforcement Task Force (OCDETF). On January 26, 2010, ATF formally applied to the Justice Department in Washington for funding through the OCDETF program. When it won approval and received additional funding, Operation Fast and Furious was reorganized as a Strike Force that included agents from the ATF, FBI, DEA, and the ICE component of the Department of Homeland Security, which would be run through the U.S. Attorney's office rather than the ATF. This new Strike Force designation allowed the operation to take advantage of sophisticated surveillance techniques such as federal wiretaps, which would require court orders and interaction from Justice Department officials in Washington, D.C. since federal law requires certain individuals to review evidence and certify the necessity of such techniques.

The dealers involved became concerned as months went by and the same individuals they reported to ATF as suspected straw purchasers returned and repeatedly bought identical weapons. As they later told the DOJ OIG, their previous experience was that after they reported a suspected straw to ATF, they did not see the straw again unless subpoenaed to testify against the straw at trial. One cooperating dealer expressed his concerns in a series of emails in April and June 2010 to GS David Voth, who assured the dealer that ATF was monitoring the suspects using a variety of techniques that he could not discuss in detail.

The tactic of letting guns walk, rather than interdicting them and arresting the buyers, led to controversy within the ATF. As the case continued, several members of Group VII, including John Dodson and Olindo Casa, became increasingly upset at the tactic of allowing guns to walk. Their standard Project Gunrunner training was to follow the straw purchasers to the hand-off to the cartel buyers, then arrest both parties and seize the guns. But according to Dodson, they watched guns being bought illegally and stashed on a daily basis, while their supervisors, including David Voth and Hope MacAllister, prevented the agents from intervening.

However, other accounts of the operation insist that ATF agents were prevented from intervening not by ATF officials, but rather by federal prosecutor Emory Hurley, who stated agents did not have sufficient evidence to arrest suspected straw-buyers. According to some reports, many agents insisted they were prevented from making arrests because prosecutors were unwilling to engage in what could become a potentially contentious political battle over Second Amendment rights during an election year, particularly given the difficult nature of prosecuting straw buyers, and the weak penalties associated with it, even if successful. Instead, prosecutor Hurley instructed ATF agents not to make arrests, but rather continue collecting evidence in order to build a stronger case. One tactic proposed for doing so was a wiretap of suspected straw-buyers, in an attempt to link the suspects to criminal activities taking place on the Mexican side of the border. Between March 20 and July 30, 2010, nine wiretaps were sought and approved by Justice Department officials, resulting in a significant delay in concluding the case.

One of the central targeted individuals was Manuel Fabian Celis-Acosta. By December 2009, Celis-Acosta was being investigated by the ATF, which had placed a secret pole camera outside his Phoenix home to track his movements. Around this time, apparently by chance, ATF agents discovered Celis-Acosta was also a potential criminal target of the DEA, which was operating a wire room to monitor live wiretaps in order to track him. On April 2, 2010, Celis-Acosta was arrested on possession of cocaine and found in possession of a weapon purchased by Uriel Patino, who had already purchased at least 434 guns from cooperating gun dealers in the Phoenix area. By this time, about a dozen ATF agents regularly surveilled Celis-Acosta as he recruited 20 friends and family to buy guns for him and regularly traveled to Texas to obtain funds from cartel associates to purchase firearms. On May 29, 2010, Celis-Acosta was detained in Lukeville, Arizona with 74 rounds of ammunition and 9 cell phones. He was then released by the chief ATF investigator on Fast and Furious, Hope MacAllister, after he promised to cooperate with her to find two specific Sinaloa cartel associates. After the redetention and arrest of Celis-Acosta in February 2011, the ATF learned that the associates they were after were FBI/DEA paid informants, and one of them was Celis-Acosta's financier. Since they were informants, they were unindictable under Operation Fast and Furious.

Later, the DOJ inspector General concluded: "We did not find persuasive evidence that agents sought to seize firearms or make arrests during the investigative stage of the case and were rebuffed by the prosecutor. ...We found that the lack of seizures and arrests was primarily attributable to the pursuit of a strategic goal shared by both the [Phoenix] ATF and the U.S. Attorney's Office—to eliminate a trafficking organization—and the belief that confronting subjects and seizing firearms could compromise that goal."

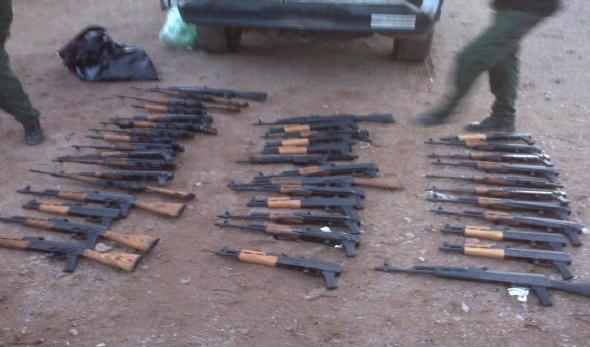
Weapons bought by Fast and Furious suspect Uriel Patino, seized by Border Patrol and Tucson ATF agents on the Tohono O'odham Reservation from a vehicle headed toward the Mexican border, February 20, 2010

By June 2010, suspects had purchased 1,608 firearms at a cost of over US$1 million at Phoenix-area gun shops. At that time, the ATF was also aware of 179 of those weapons being found at crime scenes in Mexico, and 130 in the United States. As guns traced to Fast and Furious began turning up at violent crime scenes in Mexico, ATF agents stationed there also voiced opposition.

On the evening of December 14, 2010, U.S. Border Patrol agent Brian Terry and others were patrolling Peck Canyon, Santa Cruz County, Arizona, 11 miles (18 km) from the Mexican border. The group came across five suspected illegal immigrants. When they fired non-lethal beanbag guns, the suspects responded with their own weapons, leading to a firefight. Terry was shot and killed; four of the suspects were arrested and two AK-pattern rifles were found nearby. The Attorney General's office was immediately notified of the shooting incident by email. The rifles were traced within hours of the shooting to a Phoenix store involved in the Fast and Furious operation, but the bullet that killed Terry was too badly damaged to be conclusively linked to either gun. Acting Deputy Attorney General Gary Grindler and Deputy Chief of Staff Monty Wilkinson were informed about the guns, but they didn't believe the information was sufficiently important to alert the Attorney General about it or to make any further inquiry regarding the development.

After hearing of the incident, Dodson contacted ATF headquarters, ATF's chief counsel, the ATF ethics section and the Justice Department's Office of the Inspector General, none of whom immediately responded. He and other agents then contacted Senator Chuck Grassley of Iowa (R–IA), ranking member of the Senate Judiciary Committee, who would become a major figure in the investigation of gunwalking. At the same time, information began leaking to various bloggers and Web sites.

On January 25, 2011, Burke announced the first details of the case to become officially public, marking the end of Operation Fast and Furious. At a news conference in Phoenix, he reported a 53-count indictment of 20 suspects for buying hundreds of guns intended for illegal export between September 2009 and December 2010. Newell, who was at the conference, called Fast and Furious a "phenomenal case," while denying that guns had been deliberately allowed to walk into Mexico.

Altogether, about 2,000 firearms were bought by straw purchasers during Fast and Furious. These included AK-47 variants, Barrett .50 BMG caliber sniper rifles, .38 caliber revolvers, and FN Five-sevens. As of October 20, 2011, 389 had been recovered in the US and 276 had been recovered in Mexico. The rest remained on the streets, unaccounted for. As of February 2012, the total number of recovered firearms was 710. Most of the guns went to the Sinaloa Cartel, while others made their way to El Teo and La Familia.

Although most weapons were purchased by suspects under investigation by the program, there have been reports of at least one instance of ATF agents being directly involved in the transfer of weapons. On April 13, 2010, ATF Agent John Dodson, with assistance from Agents Casa and Alt, directed a cooperating straw purchaser to give three guns to Isaiah Fernandez, a suspected gun trafficker, and had taped the conversations without prosecutor approval.

After being instructed by his superiors to obtain approval from prosecutors (albeit retroactively), Dodson's proposal was later rejected by his immediate superior David Voth, although he later received permission from Voth's supervisor after submitting a written proposal for the program. On June 1, 2010, Dodson used $2,500 of ATF funds to purchase six AK Draco pistols from local gun dealers, which he then gave to Mr. Fernandez, who reimbursed him for the expense of the guns, plus $700 for his assistance. Two days later, Agent Dodson went on a scheduled vacation without interdicting the weapons. As a result, the weapons were never recovered, no arrests were ever made, and the case was closed without charges being filed.

According to the DOJ OIG report, Agent Dodson, as the undercover posing as a straw buyer, was not expected to surveil the weapons after hand-off to Fernandez. Other ATF agents followed the weapons to a storage facility; then surveillance was terminated without interdiction. The Fernandez case was dropped from Fast and Furious after it was determined that Fernandez was not connected to Mexican cartels and had ceased buying guns for resale.

== Aftermath and reaction ==
=== Fate of walked guns ===
Since the end of Operation Fast and Furious, related firearms have continued to be discovered in criminal hands. As reported in September 2011, the Mexican government stated that an undisclosed number of guns found at about 170 crime scenes were linked to Fast and Furious. Reflecting on the operation, Attorney General Eric Holder said that the United States government is "...losing the battle to stop the flow of illegal guns to Mexico," and that the effects of Operation Fast and Furious will most likely continue to be felt for years, as more walked guns appear at Mexican crime scenes.

In April 2011, a large cache of weapons, 40 traced to Fast and Furious but also including military-grade weapons difficult to obtain legally in the US such as an anti-aircraft machine gun and grenade launcher, was found in the home of Jose Antonio Torres Marrufo, a prominent Sinaloa Cartel member, in Ciudad Juárez, Mexico. Torres Marrufo was indicted, but evaded law enforcement for a brief time. Finally, on February 4, 2012, Marrufo was arrested by the Mexican Police.

On May 29, 2011, four Mexican Federal Police helicopters attacked a cartel compound, where they were met with heavy fire, including from a .50 BMG caliber rifle. According to a report from the House Committee on Oversight and Government Reform, this rifle is likely linked to Fast and Furious.

There have been questions raised over a possible connection between Fast and Furious and the death of U.S. Immigration and Customs Enforcement agent Jaime Zapata on February 15, 2011. The gun used to kill Zapata was purchased by Otilio Osorio in the Dallas/Fort Worth Metroplex, Texas (outside the area of responsibility for the ATF Phoenix field division which conducted Fast and Furious), and then smuggled into Mexico. Congressional investigators have stated that Osorio was known by the ATF to be a straw purchaser months before he purchased the gun used to kill Zapata, leading them to question ATF surveillance tactics and to suspect a Texas-based operation similar to Fast and Furious.

In addition to Otilio Osorio, a Texas-based drug and gun trafficker, Manuel Barba, was involved in trafficking another of the guns recovered in the Zapata shooting. The timeline of this case, called "Baytown Crew", shows guns were allowed to walk during surveillance that began June 7, 2010. On August 20, 2010, Barba received a rifle later recovered in the Zapata ambush and sent it with nine others to Mexico. The warrant for Barba's arrest was issued February 14, 2011, the day before Zapata was shot. On January 30, 2012, Barba, who claimed to be working with Los Zetas in illegally exporting at least 44 weapons purchased through straw buyers, was sentenced to 100 months in prison.

On November 23, 2012, two firearms linked to the ATF were found at the scene of a shootout between Sinaloa cartel members and the Mexican military. One of the weapons was a Kalashnikov style WASR-10 rifle trafficked by Fast and Furious suspect Uriel Patino, and the other was an FN Herstal pistol originally purchased by an ATF agent. Mexican beauty queen Maria Susana Flores Gamez and four others were killed.

One of the nineteen guns Mexican authorities said they found at the hideout of Joaquín "El Chapo" Guzmán, after his January 2016 capture, was associated with the Fast and Furious operation. The Justice Department confirmed that the .50 BMG caliber rifle was bought in July 2010 in a straw purchase by someone not known to the ATF at the time, and stated the weapon was not associated with any other crime. In a letter to Congressional leaders, Assistant Attorney General Peter Kadzik, head of the Justice Department's legislative affairs office, wrote, "ATF and the department deeply regret that firearms associated with Operation Fast and Furious have been used by criminals in the commission of violent crimes, particularly crimes resulting in the deaths of civilians and law enforcement officials."

=== Investigations and fallout ===
In the U.S. Congress, Representative Darrell Issa (R–CA–49), chairman of the House Committee on Oversight and Government Reform, and Senator Chuck Grassley (R–IA), ranking member of the Senate Judiciary Committee, led investigations of gunwalking operations. There were investigations by the United States Department of Justice Office of the Inspector General and others.

==== 2011 ====
On January 27, 2011, Grassley wrote a letter to ATF Acting Director Kenneth E. Melson requesting information about the ATF-sanctioned sale of hundreds of firearms to straw purchasers. The letter mentioned a number of allegations that walked guns were used in the fight that killed Border Patrol Agent Brian Terry. A second letter from Grassley on January 31 accused the ATF of targeting whistleblowers.

On February 4, 2011, after review and comment from dozens of officials in the Justice Department Criminal Division, the Office of the Deputy Attorney General, the U.S. Attorney's Office in Phoenix, and ATF Headquarters, Assistant Attorney General Ronald Weich sent a response to Grassley regarding his two letters. Weich said claims "...that (the) ATF 'sanctioned' or otherwise knowingly allowed the sale of assault weapons to a straw purchaser who then transported them to Mexico [are] false. ATF makes every effort to interdict weapons that have been purchased illegally and prevent their transportation to Mexico." On February 28, Attorney General Eric Holder requested that the Department of Justice's Inspector General begin an investigation of Fast and Furious.

On March 22, 2011, President Barack Obama appeared on Univision and spoke about the gunwalking controversy. He said that neither he nor Attorney General Holder authorized Fast and Furious. He also stated, "There may be a situation here in which a serious mistake was made, and if that's the case then we'll find out and we'll hold somebody accountable."

On May 3, 2011, Attorney General Holder testified to the House Judiciary Committee that he did not know who approved Fast and Furious, but that it was being investigated. He also stated that he "probably heard about Fast and Furious for the first time over the last few weeks," a claim which would later be questioned as explained below.

In June, ATF Agent Vince Cefalu, who helped to publicize Fast and Furious, was served with termination papers, in a move by the agency he described as politically motivated retaliation. He had been at odds with ATF management since he filed a complaint over tactics in an unrelated case in 2005. The ATF denied that the firing was retaliation, and Cefalu's termination letter noted that he leaked documents to the Internet and showed a "lack of candor" in other operations.

On June 14, 2011, a preliminary joint staff report was released by Representative Issa and Senator Grassley. Among the findings: agents were told to stand down rather than interdict weapons, they complained about the strategy and were ignored, and Fast and Furious led to increased violence and death in Mexico. Agents were panicked, certain that "someone was going to die".

Representative Issa continued to hold hearings in June and July where ATF officials based in Phoenix and Mexico, and at headquarters in Washington, testified before the committee. ATF agent John Dodson stated that he and other agents were ordered to observe the activities of gun smugglers but not to intervene. He testified:

Over the course of the next 10 months that I was involved in this operation, we monitored as they purchased hand guns, AK-47 variants, and .50 caliber rifles almost daily. Rather than conduct any enforcement actions, we took notes, we recorded observations, we tracked movements of these individuals for a short time after their purchases, but nothing more. Knowing all the while, just days after these purchases, the guns that we saw these individuals buy would begin turning up at crime scenes in the United States and Mexico, we still did nothing. ...

I cannot begin to think of how the risk of letting guns fall into the hands of known criminals could possibly advance any legitimate law enforcement interest.

A second joint staff report was released by the Republicans on July 26.

In August, three important Fast and Furious supervisors were transferred to new management positions at ATF headquarters in Washington: William Newell and David Voth, field supervisors who oversaw the program from Phoenix, and William McMahon, an ATF deputy director of operations. The transfers were initially reported as promotions by the Los Angeles Times, but the ATF stated that they did not receive raises or take on greater responsibilities. In late August, it was announced that Acting ATF Director Melson had been reassigned to the Justice Department, and U.S. Attorney Burke announced his resignation after being questioned by Congressional investigators earlier that month.

In October, documents showing that Attorney General Holder's office had been sent briefings on Fast and Furious as early as July 2010, prompted questions about his May statement that he wasn't sure of the exact date, but had known about it for only a few weeks. The briefings were from the National Drug Intelligence Center and Assistant Attorney General Lanny Breuer. The Justice Department said that those briefings were about a different case started before Holder became Attorney General, and that while he had known about Fast and Furious, he didn't know the details of the tactics being used.

On October 31, 2011, after the release of subpoenaed documents, Assistant Attorney General Lanny Breuer stated he found out about gunwalking in Operation Wide Receiver in April 2010, and that he wished he had alerted the deputy or the attorney general at the time. The following day, in testimony before the Senate Judicial Committee in a hearing on International Organized Crime, when asked if he had reviewed the letter before it was sent to Senator Charles Grassley on February 4, 2011, denying gunwalking, Breuer replied, "I cannot say for sure whether I saw a draft of the letter that was sent to you. What I can tell you, Senator, is that at that time I was in Mexico dealing with the very real issues that we're all so committed to."

On November 8, 2011, Holder stated for the first time in Congressional testimony that gunwalking was used in Fast and Furious. He remarked that the tactic is unacceptable, and that the operation was "flawed in its concept and flawed in its execution". He further stated that his office had inaccurately described the program in previous letters sent to Congress, but that this was unintentional. Reiterating previous testimony, he said that he and other top officials had been unaware that the gunwalking tactic was being used. Holder stated that his staff had not shown him memos about the program, noting, "There is nothing in any of those memos that indicates any of those inappropriate tactics that are of concern. Those things were not brought to my attention, and my staff, I think, made the correct decision in that regard."

That same month, ex-U.S. Attorney Burke admitted to leaking sensitive documents about ATF agent and whistleblower Dodson. Senator Grassley expressed concern that the Justice Department was using Burke as a scapegoat to protect higher officials and vowed to continue his probe.

On December 2, 2011, the Justice Department formally withdrew its statement of February 4, 2011, denying gunwalking, due to inaccuracies.

Later that month, documents showed that some ATF agents discussed using Fast and Furious to provide anecdotal cases to support controversial new rules about gun sales. The regulation, called Demand Letter 3, would require 8,500 firearms dealers in Arizona, California, New Mexico and Texas that "have a significant number of crime guns traced back to them from Mexico" to report multiple rifle sales.

==== 2012 ====
Investigations by Congress and the DOJ Inspector General continued into 2012. In January, Patrick Cunningham, who was the criminal division chief at the Phoenix office of the U.S. Attorney's Office for the District of Arizona and has since resigned, asserted his innocence and his constitutional right against self-incrimination to avoid testifying. Cunningham worked directly under Burke during Fast and Furious. He was subpoenaed because of the role he might have played in the operation, and in the letter sent from the DOJ to Senator Grassley in February 2011 that claimed the ATF did not allow weapons to be trafficked to Mexico.

On January 31, 2012, Democrats on the House Oversight and Government Reform Committee released a report titled, "Fatally Flawed: Five Years of Gunwalking in Arizona". The report concluded that there was no evidence of involvement by high-ranking appointees at the Justice Department in gunwalking. Rather, Operation Fast and Furious was just one of four such operations conducted over five years during the Bush and Obama administrations, and was only "the latest in a series of fatally flawed operations run by ATF agents in Phoenix and the Arizona U.S. Attorney's Office".

In May, it was reported that the Department of Homeland Security (DHS) Office of Inspector General had begun to investigate Fast and Furious, with a report expected in October. The DHS had Immigration and Customs Enforcement agents assigned to the operation after becoming involved in late 2009.

On May 3, 2012, Congressman Issa released a memorandum to the Committee on Oversight and Government Reform that included a draft of a resolution to hold Attorney General Holder in contempt. In the memo, Issa described the connection between Operation Fast and Furious and the OCDETF program since at least January 2009, which would involve multiple executive agencies including the ATF, DOJ, DEA, FBI, ICE, and DHS. He questioned how, why, or if oversight by high level Justice Department did not occur in such an important case. He further described the tragic death of Brian Terry, the whistleblowers and their mistreatment, and the damage the operation had to US-Mexico relations.

On June 7, 2012, under the threat of being held in contempt of Congress for not turning over additional requested documents, Attorney General Holder appeared at his seventh Congressional hearing, where he continued to deny knowledge of gunwalking by high-level officials. By then, the Justice Department had turned over more than 7,000 pages of documents.

During the June 12, 2012, Senate hearing, Eric Holder stated, "If you want to talk about Fast and Furious, I'm the Attorney General that put an end to the misguided tactics that were used in Fast and Furious. An Attorney General who I suppose you would hold in higher regard was briefed on these kinds of tactics in an operation called Wide Receiver and did nothing to stop them—nothing. Three hundred guns, at least, walked in that instance." Holder cited a briefing paper on "Wide Receiver"; the DOJ Office of Legislative Affairs later clarified that the briefing paper was about the Fidel Hernandez case, prepared for Holder's predecessor, U.S. Attorney General Michael Mukasey before his meeting with Mexican Attorney General Mora on November 16, 2007. The Hernandez Case had ended October 6, 2007, before Mukasey entered office November 9, 2007. The office further explained, "As Attorney General Holder also noted in his testimony, and as we have set forth in prior correspondence and testimony, he took measures and instituted a series of important reforms designed to ensure that the inappropriate tactics used in Fast and Furious, Wide Receiver, Hernandez, and other matters about which the Department has informed Congress are not repeated." The later DOJ OIG investigation concluded "Attorney General Mukasey was not briefed about Operation Wide Receiver or gun 'walking,' but on a different and traditional law enforcement tactic that was employed in a different case."

On June 20, 2012, the House Oversight and Government Reform Committee voted along party lines to recommend that Holder be held in contempt. At issue were 1,300 pages of documents that had not been turned over to Congress by the DOJ. Earlier that day, President Obama had invoked executive privilege over those documents, marking the first time the privilege had been asserted during his presidency. Issa contends that the Obama executive privilege claim is a cover-up or an obstruction to the congressional probe.

On June 28, 2012, Holder became the first sitting member of the Cabinet of the United States to be held in criminal contempt of Congress by the House of Representatives for refusing to disclose internal Justice Department documents in response to a subpoena. The vote was 255–67 in favor, with 17 Democrats voting yes and a large number of Democrats walking off the floor in protest and refusing to vote. A civil contempt measure was also voted on and passed, 258–95. The civil contempt vote allows the House Committee on Oversight and Government Reform to go to court with a civil lawsuit to look into the US Justice Department's refusal to turn over some of the subpoenaed documents and to test Obama's assertion of executive privilege. Holder dismissed the votes as "the regrettable culmination of what became a misguided—and politically motivated—investigation during an election year," and the White House called it "political theater rather than legitimate congressional oversight". The National Rifle Association controversially lobbied for Holder to be held in contempt.

In June 2012, a six-month-long investigation by Fortune magazine stated that the ATF never intentionally allowed guns to fall into the hands of Mexican drug cartels, in contrast to most other reports. Agents interviewed during the investigation repeatedly asserted that only one isolated incident of gunwalking ever occurred, and was performed independently by ATF Agent John Dodson (who later appeared on CBS News as a whistleblower to denounce the gunwalking scandal) as part of an unauthorized solo action outside the larger Fast and Furious operation.

On July 31, 2012, the first part of a new three-part report, Fast and Furious: The Anatomy of a Failed Operation, was released by Republican lawmakers. The report singled out five ATF supervisors for responsibility in Fast and Furious, all of whom had been previously reassigned. The report also said that Fast and Furious resulted from a change in strategy by the Obama Administration. The Justice Department was dismissive of the report, saying that it contained "distortions" and "debunked conspiracy theories," and that gunwalking tactics dated back to 2006. DOJ spokeswoman Tracy Schmaler, while critical of the report, did credit it for acknowledging that the idea for "gun walking"—allowing illegal sales of weapons on the border—originated under the Republican administration before Eric Holder took office in 2009. Schmaler noted that Holder moved swiftly to replace the ATF's management and instill reforms. On the same day, ATF Deputy Director William Hoover, who was one of the five blamed in the Congressional report, officially retired. The report included an appendix disputing claims in the Fortune article. Following its publication, Dodson's lawyer wrote the managing editor of Fortune stating the article was "demonstrably false" and that a retraction was in order. After Fortune did not retract the article, Dodson sued for libel on October 12, 2012.

On September 19, 2012, the Department of Justice Inspector General Michael Horowitz publicly released a 471-page report detailing the results of the Justice Department's own internal investigations. The Inspector General's report, which had access to evidence and interviews with witnesses not permitted in previous Congressional reports, recommended 14 federal officials for disciplinary action, ranging from ATF agents to federal prosecutors involved in the Fast and Furious operation. It found "no evidence" that Attorney General Holder knew about Fast and Furious before early 2011. It found no evidence that previous Attorneys General had been advised about gunwalking in Operation Wide Receiver.

While the OIG report found no evidence that higher officials at the Justice Department in Washington had authorized or approved of the tactics used in the Fast and Furious investigations, it did fault 14 lower officials for related failures, including failures to take note of "red flags" uncovered by the investigation, as well as failures to follow up on information produced through Operation Fast and Furious and its predecessor, Operation Wide Receiver. The report also noted ATF agents' apparent frustrations over legal obstacles from the Phoenix Attorney's Office to prosecuting suspected "straw-buyers," while also criticizing the agents' failure to quickly intervene and interdict weapons obtained by low-level suspects in the case. The 14 Justice Department employees were referred for possible internal discipline. The Justice Department's Criminal Division head Lanny Breuer, an Obama administration presidential appointee, was cited for not alerting his bosses in 2010 to the flaws of Operation Wide Receiver. Deputy Assistant Attorney General Jason Weinstein, who was responsible for authorizing a portion of the wiretap applications in Operation Fast and Furious and faulted in the report for not identifying the gunwalking tactics, resigned on the day of the report.

On December 4, 2012, the ATF Professional Review Board delivered its recommendations to high-level ATF managers, who would decide whether to accept them. The recommendations included firing William McMahon, ATF Deputy Assistant Director; Mark Chait, ATF Assistant Director for Field Operations; William Newell, Phoenix ATF Special Agent in Charge; and George Gillett, Newell's second in command. Two additional ATF employees, Phoenix supervisor David Voth and lead agent Hope McAllister, received recommendations for demotion and disciplinary transfer to another ATF post, respectively. It was reported the next day that McMahon had been fired. It was also announced that Gary Grindler, Eric Holder's chief of staff who was faulted in the OIG report, would be leaving the Justice Department. Later that month, the family of Brian Terry sued seven government officials and a gun shop involved in Operation Fast and Furious for negligence and wrongful death.

==== 2013 ====
Agent John Dodson's book on his experiences in Operation Fast and Furious was released by Simon and Schuster on December 3, 2013.

==== 2019 ====
A settlement was announced in 2019 where both sides disagree with the prior court's orders and agree to continue to fight over privilege issues.

==== 2020 ====
Conclusion of a recent investigation 18 month multi-agency operation "Fury Road" results in 82 federal prosecutions; seizure of 128 firearms, 1 kilogram of heroin and cocaine base.

=== Related criminal prosecutions ===
On July 9, 2012, an indictment charging five men in the death of U.S. Border Patrol Agent Brian Terry was unsealed. The FBI offered a reward of $250,000 per fugitive for information leading to their arrests. The indictment, originally handed up on November 7, 2011, charges Manuel Osorio-Arellanes, Jesus Rosario Favela-Astorga, Ivan Soto-Barraza, Heraclio Osorio-Arellanes and Lionel Portillo-Meza with first-degree murder, second-degree murder, and other crimes. Manuel Osorio-Arellanes pleaded guilty to avoid the death penalty and was expected to be sentenced in March 2013. As of December 12, 2012, another of the suspects is in custody, and three remained fugitives.

On October 15, 2012, Danny Cruz Morones, one of the twenty individuals indicted as a result of Fast and Furious, was sentenced to 57 months in prison. He was the first of the twenty to be sentenced. He pleaded guilty to straw purchasing and recruiting others to buy guns. According to prosecutors, he bought 27 AK-47s, and his recruits bought dozens more.

In November, 2012, an undisclosed series of contractors working for CACI, Inc. on behalf of Department of Homeland Security were detained in a series of internal investigations. One outcome resulting in the wrongful imprisonment, enhanced interrogation and subsequent deportation of a federal contractor who whistleblew on colleagues were involved in the supply of arms and corruption. This was later revealed in evidentiary hearings that indicted agents had attempted to frame the leaking whistleblower contractor. The cases were later moved to federal court and dismissed under protected privilege of Attorney General Eric Holder's retained privilege. As of currently 2024 the matter remains partially sealed under classification despite some local news reports of the initial whistleblowers arrest.

On December 12, 2012, Jaime Avila Jr. received the maximum penalty of 57 months in prison for gun dealing and conspiracy. He pleaded guilty after two AK-47 type rifles purchased by him were found at the scene of Border Patrol Agent Brian Terry's death. Federal prosecutors stated that, in addition to gun trafficking, he had recruited others to do the same. He was under ATF surveillance at the time.

In April 2017 a suspect in the 2010 murder of Patrol agent Brian Terry, Heraclio Osorio-Arellanes, was arrested on a ranch on the border of Sinaloa and Chihuahua, Mexico, by a task force that included the DEA, United States federal Marshals, the Border Patrol Tactical Unit, and Mexican law enforcement. With four cartel members allegedly in the same crew as Osorio-Arellanes in U.S. prisons for the crime–Manual Osorio-Arellanes, Ivan Soto-Barraza, Jesus Sanchez-Meza, and Rosario Rafael Burboa-Alvarez– the last alleged crew member believed to be still at large was Jesus Rosario Favela-Astorga.

== Mexican reactions ==
As more information on Operations Fast and Furious and Wide Receiver was revealed in 2011, Mexican officials, political commentators and media reacted with anger. Mexican officials stated in September that the U.S. government still had not briefed them on what went wrong nor had they apologized.

Due to several failed attempts at coordinating with Mexican law enforcement in the apprehension of suspected arms traffickers in the Wide Receiver and Hernandez cases, and concerns about widespread corruption, details of Operation Fast and Furious were not shared with Mexican government officials, and they were deliberately kept out of the loop after related firearms began turning up at crime scenes and in criminal arsenals in 2010. The U.S. Embassy in Mexico and the ATF Mexico City Office (MCO) were also kept in the dark. According to Attorney General of Mexico Marisela Morales, the Mexican government was told about the undercover program in January 2011, but they were not provided details at the time.

Morales stated, "At no time did we know or were we made aware that there might have been arms trafficking permitted. In no way would we have allowed it, because it is an attack on the safety of Mexicans." In addition, she expressed that allowing weapons to "walk" would represent a "betrayal" of Mexico. Morales said that her office would search "to the end" in order to clarify what happened in Fast and Furious. In November 2011, it was reported that the Mexican Attorney General's office was seeking the extradition of six citizens of the United States implicated with smuggling weapons.

Mexican Senator Arturo Escobar stated after hearing about Operation Wide Receiver, "We can no longer tolerate what is occurring. There must be condemnation from the state," and that the Mexican Senate condemned the actions of the ATF.

Jorge Carlos Ramírez Marín, president of the Chamber of Deputies of Mexico from the Institutional Revolutionary Party, said "This is a serious violation of international law. What happens if next time they need to introduce trained assassins or nuclear weapons?"

Chihuahua state prosecutor Patricia Gonzalez, who had worked closely with the US for years, said, "The basic ineptitude of these officials [who ordered the Fast and Furious operation] caused the death of my brother and surely thousands more victims." Her brother, Mario, had been kidnapped, tortured and killed by cartel hit men in October 2010. Later, two AK-47 rifles found among the several weapons recovered after a gunfight between police and cartel members were traced to the Fast and Furious program.

Mexican Congressman Humberto Benítez Treviño, a former attorney general, called Fast and Furious "a bad business that got out of hand". He had also characterized it as "an undercover program that wasn't properly controlled".

Like many politicians, Mexican pundits across the political spectrum expressed anger at news of both operations. La Jornada, a left-leaning newspaper, asked "US: ally or enemy?" The paper also argued that after news about Wide Receiver, the Mérida Initiative should be immediately suspended. A right-leaning paper accused the US of violating Mexican sovereignty. Manuel J. Jauregui of the Reforma newspaper wrote, "In sum, the gringo government has been sending weapons to Mexico in a premeditated and systematic manner, knowing that their destinations were Mexican criminal organizations."

=== Allegations of deal with Sinaloa drug cartel ===
High-ranking Sinaloa drug cartel member Jesus Vicente Zambada-Niebla has claimed in court that the gang was financed and armed by the U.S. government as part of a secret deal to undermine other Mexican drug cartels. The deal allegedly began sometime before 2004 and lasted until at least March 2009.

Mexican news outlet El Universal has reported that Fast and Furious was part of a scheme to intentionally arm the Sinaloa cartel so that it could defeat rival drug gangs, as part of a secret 'divide and conquer' strategy of the U.S. government aimed at the long-term goal of wiping out all of the drug cartels, a strategy which had previously been employed in Colombia. It is also alleged that as part of the deal, the U.S. government agreed not to pursue charges against the Sinaloa cartel for drug trafficking in the U.S.

== See also ==
- List of ATF controversies
- Mexican drug war
- Mérida Initiative
- Strategy of tension
