= Heffelfinger =

Heffelfinger (meaning: pedigree or person came from Häfelfingen, Switzerland) is a surname, and may refer to:

- Heffelfinger Creek, see List of Minnesota streams

== People ==
- Chris Heffelfinger, researcher and writer based in Washington, D.C.
- Frank Heffelfinger - see Early history of Minnesota Golden Gophers football
- Jane Heffelfinger, see Manitoba general election, 1969
- Thomas B. Heffelfinger, U.S. Attorney for Minnesota
- Totton Heffelfinger, president of the United States Golf Association, see Hazeltine National Golf Club
- Pudge Heffelfinger (1867 - 1954), American football player
