= Rachel Paulose =

American attorney

United States Attorney for the District of Minnesota
- In office March 9, 2007 – November 19, 2007
- President: George W. Bush
- Preceded by: Thomas Heffelfinger
- Succeeded by: B. Todd Jones

Personal details
- Born: March 12, 1973 (age 53) Kerala, India
- Party: Republican
- Education: University of Minnesota (BA); Yale University (JD)
- Profession: Attorney

Rachel Kunjummen Paulose (born March 12, 1973) is an American attorney. She was nominated by President George W. Bush and unanimously confirmed by the United States Senate to serve as a United States Attorney. She was the youngest person and the first woman to lead the District of Minnesota and the first Indian American woman to be nominated by a president and confirmed by the Senate for any federal position.

== Early life and education ==
Paulose's parents are Joseph, buildings and grounds superintendent for the Hopkins, Minnesota school district, and Lucy, a software engineer. She had one younger sister, Elizabeth Goulette, who died in 2019. She is of Malayali descent.

In 1994, she earned a B.A., summa cum laude, from the University of Minnesota where she was Phi Beta Kappa and a Harry S. Truman Scholar. She earned national recognition and honors as the Chair of the Student Representatives to the Board of Regents. She also served as the Commencement Speaker at the University of Minnesota.

She earned her J.D. from the Yale Law School, where she was a Coker Fellow.

== Career ==
Paulose's legal career began in 1997 when she worked as a law clerk under Judge James B. Loken of the U.S. Court of Appeals for the Eighth Circuit. She then worked as a trial attorney in the Attorney General's Honors Program from 1998 to 1999. There, she prosecuted violations of the federal civil rights laws in the Voting Section of the Civil Rights Division.

From 1999 until 2002, she worked as an Assistant United States Attorney. She first-chaired many trials in federal district court. She also briefed and argued many appeals before the U.S. Court of Appeals for the Eighth Circuit. Cases involved narcotics, violent crime, economic crime. Jury trial and Eighth circuit appellate highlights: precedent-setting detention of suspect based on economic threat alone; precedent-setting appellate work rejecting expansion of alien criminal defendants' claims of rights under Vienna Convention.

She worked in private practice after 2002 with the Williams & Connolly law firm in Washington D.C. until 2003, where her work focused on health care litigation and business.

She was with the Dorsey & Whitney law firm in Minneapolis from 2003 until December 2005. Work included defense of health care providers, commercial litigation, and constitutional advocacy. Paulose was appointed as the United States Attorney for the District of Minnesota in August 2006 and remained in that position until November 2007.

Paulose subsequently worked as a senior counsel at the Securities and Exchange Commission.

In 2015 she became a partner with the DLA Piper law firm. She was also a visiting professor at the University of St. Thomas (Minnesota). The Chief Judge of the District and the Federal Bar Association honored Paulose as one of the 30 leading Minnesota women history makers. Her biography was added to the Smithsonian Institution’s collection in April 2016 and featured in the Smithsonian’s collection "Beyond Bollywood: Indian Americans Shape the Nation", celebrating groundbreaking Indian Americans.

=== Appointment as U.S. Attorney ===
In January 2006, Paulose returned to the Justice Department, where she briefly served as senior counsel to acting deputy attorney general Paul McNulty and was the department's special counsel for health care fraud. She assisted with the formulation of guidelines for health care fraud and corporate fraud prosecution. She was a special assistant to Attorney General Alberto Gonzales.

On February 17, 2006, Paulose was appointed to serve as interim U.S. attorney for the District of Minnesota; the incumbent U.S. attorney, Thomas Heffelfinger, had announced his resignation effective February 28. Under her leadership, the U.S. Attorney's Office for the District of Minnesota achieved the highest number of prosecutions in its history. Paulose has provided legal analysis for various media outlets, including the BBC, The Wall Street Journal, The Washington Post, USA Today, and MSNBC.

On August 3, 2006, while Paulose was serving as interim U.S. Attorney in Minnesota, President George W. Bush sent her nomination to the U.S. Senate, which unanimously confirmed her on December 9, 2006, the last day of the 109th Congress.

The confirmation occurred after a Senate Judiciary Committee hearing and the approval of both Minnesota senators.

Paulose pledged to fight child pornographers, saying that they were becoming "more graphic, more heinous, and frankly appalling". She also spoke out against urban crime and in favor of holding public officials accountable for their actions.

Paulose resigned in November 2007 after several members of her staff themselves resigned in protest over her leadership.

=== Swearing-in ceremony ===
Paulose's investiture was held before 300 people in the atrium of the University of St. Thomas School of Law in Minneapolis on March 9, 2007. Subsequently, Leah McLean of the Minneapolis television station KSTP ran a piece likening it to a "coronation", showing a program that referred to a "processional" and included a U.S. Marine color guard, professional photographer and choir.

Paulose has dismissed the criticism, saying the program KSTP based its report on was inaccurate and had been discarded long before the ceremony, although the color guard and choir were indeed present. She also added that the cost to taxpayers was minimal since the school donated the use of its atrium (which it normally rents for $1,500) for the investiture ceremony at her request, she paid for everything and the total government cost of the ceremony was only $225, less than half the $500 she was budgeted. Representatives of government watchdog groups said the donation was inappropriate and that the money spent didn't include the cost to taxpayers of event planning by Paulose's employees.

The Star Tribune reported that it was unusual that "the former U.S. attorney for Minnesota, Thomas Heffelfinger, was not invited" to the ceremony. Paulose's spokesperson, Jeanne Cooney, said, "It was a public event. Anybody who wanted to go could have gone." The article speculated that Heffelfinger, a moderate Republican, could have been a candidate for a purge list had he not stepped aside to make way for a more conservative candidate.

=== Staff resignations ===
On April 5, 2007, three of Paulose's top administrators—First Assistant U.S. Attorney John Marti, second in command; civil division head Erika Monzangue and criminal division head James Lackner—voluntarily resigned those positions, reverting to simple assistant U.S. attorney status, reportedly in protest over Paulose's management style. According to the Star Tribune, she was noted for dressing down underlings and quoting Bible verses on the job.

The resignations occurred after a visit from a representative of the Executive Office of the U.S. Attorney in Washington. A later report said that the visit had been a last-ditch attempt by the Bush administration to persuade the three not to resign, and that a fourth official declined to comment on whether he had resigned or not. Paulose's defenders say that three simply had trouble changing their ways to accommodate an aggressive young prosecutor determined to bring the office more into line with the Attorney General's policies, and it had nothing to do with politics.

=== U.S. Attorney dismissal controversy ===
On April 17, 2007, the Associated Press reported that the House Judiciary Committee had contacted Paulose for voluntary questioning about the "firings of 8 U.S. federal prosecutors" On May 31, the Los Angeles Times wrote that Paulose's predecessor was removed from his post for failing to pursue voter fraud cases that would prevent a significant number of Native Americans in Minnesota from casting ballots in the 2004 election, and that Paulose's appointment stemmed not only from her credentials, but from her work in private law filing "election lawsuits on behalf of the Minnesota GOP".

An internal Justice Department audit found that some of Paulose's employees claimed that she treated subordinates harshly. Kenneth E. Melson, head of the department's Executive Office for U.S. Attorneys, met with her in Minnesota. The U.S. Office of Special Counsel released its findings on December 3, 2008. It noted that the settlement agreement "was entered into by the Department of Justice as a no-fault agreement and was not to be construed as an admission of liability by DOJ." The office and home of the OSC official who led the investigation of Paulose were raided "as part of an investigation into whether he himself mixed politics with official business." Paulose resigned on November 19, 2007, to take a position at the Justice Department. Minnesota Star Tribune columnist Katherine Kersten wrote of the event:

In a classic campaign of character assassination, the media dinned into our ears the claims of anonymous leakers in Paulose's office. Over the months, the drip, drip, drip of rumor and innuendo resulted in the professional crucifixion of a fine public servant and a fine human being. Paulose's critics were primarily pundits and self-interested leakers, aided and abetted by former employees of the U.S. attorney's office.

== Memberships ==
Paulose is a contributing author for the American Bar Association focusing on Supreme Court cases and a guest writer for the Asian-American Press. She is Vice President for the Minnesota chapter of the National Asian Pacific American Bar Association and for the Eighth Circuit chapter of the Federal Bar Association. She also serves on the boards of directors of the League of Women Voters, the Yale Law School Fund, and the Trust for Public Land, in addition to being a scholarship selection judge for the Harry S. Truman Scholarship Foundation. Paulose is a member of the Federalist Society.

Legal offices
Preceded by Thomas B. Heffelfinger	U.S. Attorney for the District of Minnesota; 2006-2007	Succeeded by B. Todd Jones
