= Assembly (museum) =

Coordinates: 41°39′13″N 74°41′1″W

Assembly is a non-profit museum in Monticello, New York featuring the work of 21st century international artists created by Bosco Sodi. It is housed in a former Buick dealership. The 23,000 square foot space has been updated by architect Alberto Kalach.
