= Sodi family =

Mexican political family

Sodi
- Political family
- Current region: Mexico City
- Origin: Italian Mexican Community, Spanish Mexican Community — Italy (Tuscany), Spain, Mexico (Oaxaca)
- Founded: 19th century
- Founder: Carlos Sodi Bartoloni
- Members: Demetrio Sodi Guergué; Thalía
- Connected families: Pallares

The Sodi family is a Mexican political family that is prominent in Mexican politics, law, art, and entertainment. The progenitor of the family, Carlos Sodi, emigrated from Florence to the southern Mexican state of Oaxaca in the 19th century. The family was a part of the Oaxacan liberal elite during the Porfiriato, owning numerous estates and large tracts of land. Strong allies to the regime, several members of the family occupied important political positions in the government of General Porfirio Díaz.

== History ==
The Sodi family originates from the city of Florence, in the region of Tuscany, and its immigrant ancestor, the Italian engineer and lieutenant colonel Carlos Sodi (born 1805), was part of the Italian contingent that settled in Oaxaca during the 19th century. His second-born son, Carlos Sodi Candiani, married Dolores Guergué Antuñana y del Solar Campero, granddaughter of former Oaxacan governor José Joaquín Guergué, and whose family of Criollo origin had belonged to the local aristocracy since around 1700. In 1882, he occupied a seat for the first time as Senator of the Mexican Republic in the XI Legislature of the Mexican Congress, a post he would hold at least ten times during the dictatorship, representing the states of Oaxaca and Michoacán. Demetrio Sodi Guergué, son of the latter, in continuation of his family's close ties to the Porfirian regime, was promoted to Minister of the Supreme Court of Justice of the Nation in 1906, a position he would occupy until 1914. During this period, he came to occupy the Presidency of the Court on two separate occasions. In 1911, he was integrated into the Presidential Cabinet as Secretary of Justice.

By the late 19th and early 20th centuries, the family owned large tracts of land in the state. The Sodi Candiani brothers, Carlos and Demetrio, were the owners of Hacienda Concepción and Hacienda Candiani and its annex, La Compañía. The latter was dedicated to the production of sugar cane and had a land surface of 328-50-23 hectares. Alfredo Sodi was the owner of Hacienda San Luis Beltrán, which had a land surface of 1,765-71-58 hectares. The family was also a shareholder in La Natividad mine, the most productive and technologically advanced in the state by 1906, which employed 450 workers, with Demetrio Sodi having sat on the board of directors.

== Notable members ==
- Demetrio Sodi Candiani (1837–1904), lawyer and landowner, co-owner of Hacienda Candiani and Hacienda Concepción alongside his brother, Carlos.
- Carlos Sodi Candiani (1838–1909), lawyer, politician, and landowner, who served as Senator of the Mexican Republic for the states of Oaxaca from 1882–1884 and Michoacán for approximately 25 years.
  - Demetrio Sodi Guergué (1866–1934), journalist, jurist, and politician, who served as president of the Supreme Court of Justice of the Nation from 1908–1910 and as Secretary of Justice from March–May 1911.
    - María Elena Sodi Pallares (1903–1962), writer and suffragist.
    - Amelia Sodi Pallares (1909–1993), politician and suffragist, who served as the first President of the Women's Section of the National Action Party.
    - Demetrio Sodi Pallares (1913–2003), cardiologist, professor, and researcher, recipient of the Order of Merit of the Italian Republic and the Brazilian Order of Medical Merit.
      - Juan Sodi de la Tijera (born 1943), chemical engineer and property developer; former husband of Laura Zapata.
        - Bosco Sodi (born 1970), contemporary artist.
      - Demetrio Sodi de la Tijera (born 1944), journalist, businessman, and politician, who served as a federal deputy during the LIV and LVII Legislatures of the Congress of the Union, Senator of the Mexican Republic for Mexico City from 2000–2006, and as head of Miguel Hidalgo borough from 2009–2012.
    - Fernando Sodi Pallares (1917–1980), philosopher and professor.
    - Ernesto Sodi Pallares (1919–1977), criminologist; maternal grandson of Jacinto Pallares.
      - Gabriela Sodi Miranda (born 1959), historian of art and politician, who serves as a federal deputy during the LXV Legislature of the Congress of the Union.
      - Ernestina Sodi Miranda (born 1960), journalist, model, and writer.
        - Camila González Sodi (born 1986), actress and singer; former wife of Diego Luna.
      - Ariadna Thalía Sodi Miranda (born 1971), singer, actress, and composer; wife of Tommy Mottola.
      - Federica Sodi Miranda, iconographic archaeologist, who served as director of the Chichen Itza archaeological zone from 2005–2006 and director of the National Institute of Anthropology and History in Yucatán from 2006–2009.
  - Federico Sodi Romero (1890–1969), criminal lawyer, novelist, and playwright; half-brother of Demetrio.
    - Margarita Sodi Serret, lawyer, fifth woman to ever graduate from Escuela Libre de Derecho.
    - Federico Sodi Serret (1936–2010), lawyer.
    - Carlos Sodi Serret (1938–2019), civil, commercial, and family litigation lawyer, journalist, and professor emeritus at Escuela Libre de Derecho.
      - Jorge Sodi Patiño (born 1966), civil and commercial litigation lawyer and professor at Escuela Libre de Derecho.
  - María Sodi Romero (1895–1985), screen printer; wife of Alfredo Ramos Martinez.
  - Consuelo Sodi Romero, mother of Carlos.
    - Carlos Franco Sodi (1904–1961), lawyer, professor, and jurist, who served as Minister of the Supreme Court of Justice of the Nation and as Attorney General of Mexico from 1952–1956.
      - Manuel Sodi del Valle, politician, who served as a federal deputy during the XL Legislature of the Congress of the Union; nephew of Carlos.
        - Ricardo Sodi Cuellar, lawyer and professor, dean of the Faculty of Law at Anáhuac University.
      - Alberto Sodi del Valle, politician, who served as a deputy to the Congress of Oaxaca; nephew of Carlos.
- Alfredo Sodi, landowner, owner of Hacienda San Luis Beltrán; cousin of Carlos and godfather of Gustavo Díaz Ordaz.

== See also ==
- List of political families
- Mexican Revolution
- Oaxaca City
