= U.A.B.J. Oaxaca =

Mexican professional football club

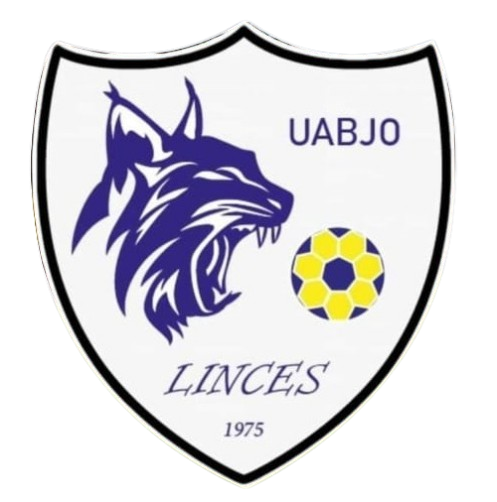
- Full name: Linces de la Universidad Autónoma Benito Juárez de Oaxaca.
- Nickname(s): Linces
- Founded: November 2, 1975
- Ground: Unidad Deportiva de CU. Oaxaca
- Capacity: 1,000
- League: liga mayor Oaxaca
Home colours	Away colours

U.A.B.J. is a Mexican professional football club based in the city of Oaxaca, it competes in liga mayor Oaxaca, a regional league in the state of Oaxaca. It was founded in 1975. The club represents the Universidad Autónoma Benito Juárez de Oaxaca. Its activities began in the Tercera Division de Mexico but has yet to reach the Liga MX.

== History ==
For the 1985-86 season as Oaxaca B the club took part in group B alongside Cachorros Neza, Orizaba, Galicia and Mtz. de la Torre where after 36 the club finished last winning just four games which caused their relegation to the third Division. After this season, the club went into hiatus throughout the 1980s.

== See also ==
- Benito Juárez Autonomous University of Oaxaca
- Segunda Division
