= The Cultivist =

The Cultivist is a private member's club used by people in the art world. It was founded in 2015, and has head offices in London and in New York City.

== History ==
The Cultivist was founded in 2015 by Marlies Verhoeven and Daisy Peat, who worked together during the launch of the Sotheby's VIP program, Sotheby's Preferred. Verhoeven has a background in finance while Peat came from advertising.

The Cultivist offers concierge services to its members and provides access to key events on the art world calendar from major art fairs to studio visits. Its only revenue source is membership fees and it makes over half a million dollars of donation to museums and art institutions around the world annually.

In the first of its launch, the number of members was capped at 1,000. The community of art lovers has since grown exponentially in regions like: the US West Coast, France, and Mexico. More than half of its members are collectors and its founding members include artists Marina Abramović, Glenn Kaino, and Richard Phillips.

The membership model allows members to skip the line at over 100 partnering museums around the world and gain special access to nearly 40 international art fairs. The Cultivist also hosts monthly events for its members in different cities and at art fairs. Events range from studio visits, museum tours, to artist luncheons. In April 2016, The Cultivist and Bosco Sodi hosted a dinner at the artist's studio in Red Hook. Its events at art fairs such as Venice Biennale and Art Basel Miami brought together its members, collectors, and artists. With its extensive art world contacts, The Cultivist team provides guides to these fairs for various magazines and online publications.
