= Arturo Chávez =

Arturo Chávez may refer to:

- Arturo Chávez Chávez (born 1960), Mexican prosecutor and Attorney General of Mexico
- Arturo Chávez (athlete) (born 1990), Peruvian high jumper
