= Federico Sodi Romero =

Mexican lawyer, novelist, and playwright

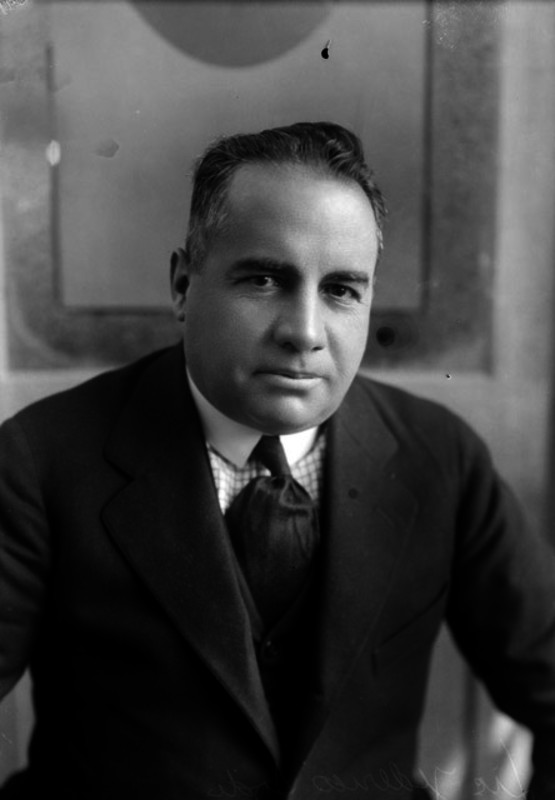
- Portrait by Agustín Casasola c. 1926
- Born: Federico Luis Carlos Sodi Romero; March 2, 1890; Oaxaca City, Oaxaca, Mexico
- Died: December 15, 1969 (aged 79); Mexico City, Mexico
- Education: Institute of Sciences and Arts of Oaxaca (LLB)
- Occupations: Lawyer; novelist; playwright
- Children: 5
- Relatives: Sodi family

Federico Luis Carlos Sodi Romero (Spanish pronunciation: [feðeˈɾiko ˈlwis ˈkaɾlos ˈsoði roˈmeɾo]; March 2, 1890 – December 15, 1969) was a Mexican lawyer, novelist, professor, and playwright who gained notoriety as a public defender in his native Oaxaca City and later in Mexico City. He was the defense attorney of David Alfaro Siqueiros in the lead-up to his trial for the attempted assassination of Leon Trotsky.

== Early life and education ==
Federico Luis Carlos Sodi Romero was born on March 2, 1890, in Oaxaca City, Oaxaca. He was the son of Carlos Sodi Candiani and Refugio Romero Guendulain. On his father's side he belonged to the Sodi family, whose members have stood out throughout Mexican history in different fields.

In 1913, Sodi graduated with a law degree from the Institute of Sciences and Arts of Oaxaca.

Sodi was a professor at the National School of Jurisprudence for 4 years, during which he counted Miguel Alemán among his students, who during his mandate as Mexican president, offered him a seat as a federal deputy, which he refused.

== Bibliography ==
- La Ciudad Tranquila (1919)
- Un "pobre diablo" (1923)
- Afrodita, mujer práctica: novela inédita (1923)
- Feliciano cumple medio siglo (1942)
- Clase Media (1948)
- El jurado resuelve: memorias (1961)
