= Carlos Franco Sodi =

Mexican jurist

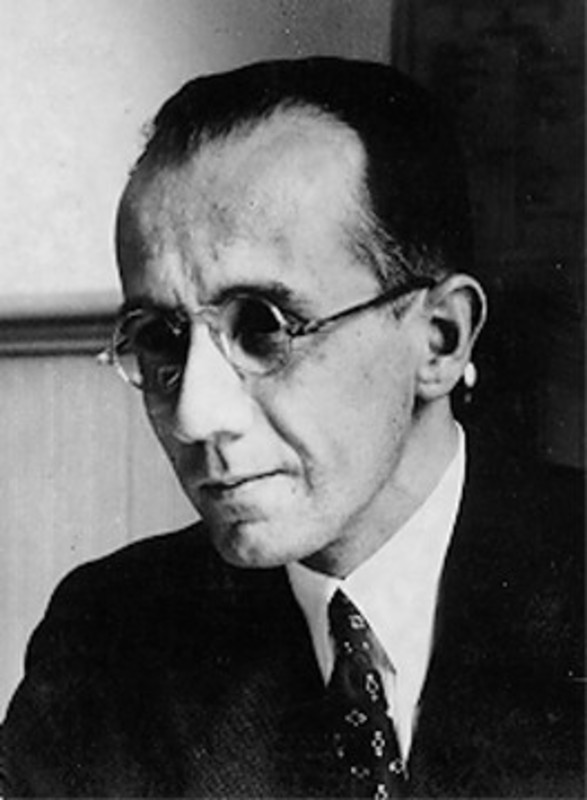
- Portrait by Agustín Casasola c. 1938

Attorney General of Mexico
- In office 1952–1956
- Nominated by: Adolfo Ruiz Cortines
- Preceded by: Francisco González de la Vega
- Succeeded by: José Aguilar y Maya

Personal details
- Born: March 31, 1904 Oaxaca City, Oaxaca, Mexico
- Died: April 24, 1961 (aged 57) Mexico City, Mexico
- Relatives: Sodi family
- Education: National School of Jurisprudence

Carlos Franco Sodi (Spanish pronunciation: [ˈkaɾlos ˈfɾaŋko ˈsoði]; March 31, 1904 – April 24, 1961) was a Mexican lawyer, professor, and jurist who served as the Attorney General of Mexico during the presidency of Adolfo Ruiz Cortines from 1952 to 1956. He founded, alongside others, the Mexican Academy of Criminal Sciences.
