= Demetrio Sodi Guergué =

Mexican journalist, writer, jurist and politician (1866–1934)

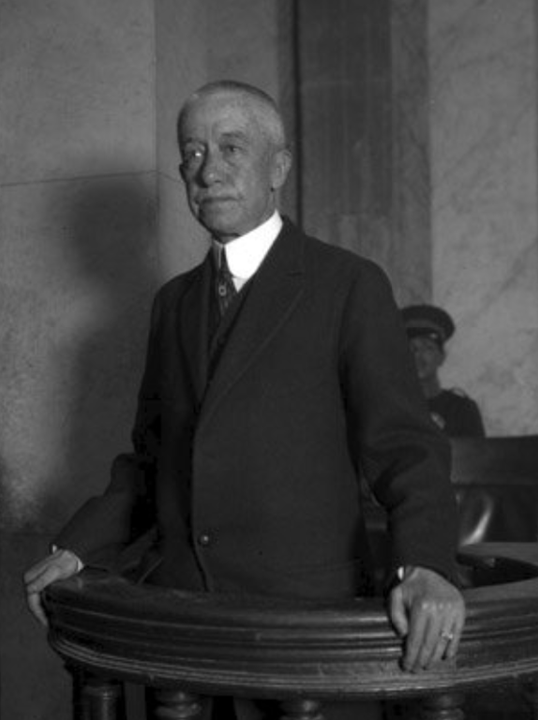
- Portrait by Agustín Casasola c. 1922, nitrate photographic negative, National Museum of Photography.

Secretary of Justice
- In office March 25, 1911 – May 25, 1911
- President: Porfirio Díaz
- Preceded by: Justino Fernández Mondoño
- Succeeded by: Rafael L. Hernández

President of the Supreme Court of Justice of the Nation
- In office 1908–1910
- Preceded by: Manuel García Méndez
- Succeeded by: Félix Romero

Personal details
- Born: Demetrio Sodi Guergué Antuñana; October 18, 1866 Oaxaca City, Oaxaca, Mexico
- Died: October 29, 1934 (aged 68) Mexico City, Mexico
- Spouse: Carmen Pallares Portillo
- Children: 12, including: Demetrio; María Elena; Ernesto; Fernando
- Relatives: Sodi family
- Education: Institute of Sciences and Arts of Oaxaca (LLB)

Demetrio Sodi Guergué Antuñana (Spanish pronunciation: [deˈmetɾjo ˈsoði ɣeɾˈɣe antuˈɲana]; October 18, 1866 – October 29, 1934) was a Mexican journalist, writer, jurist and politician who served as the President of the Supreme Court of Justice of the Nation from 1908 to 1910, and as Secretary of Justice during the presidency of Porfirio Díaz from March to May 1911. He was also the defense attorney in the trial of José de León Toral, the assassin of then president-elect Alvaro Obregón.

== Early life and education ==
Demetrio Sodi Guergué Antuñana was born on October 18, 1866, in Oaxaca City, Oaxaca. He was the first son of Carlos Sodi Candiani and Dolores Guergué Antuñana y del Solar Campero. On his father's side he belonged to the Sodi family, whose members have stood out throughout Mexican history in different fields. His mother died when he was six years old.

He studied at the Institute of Sciences and Arts of Oaxaca where he was a student of Félix Romero, who years later would go on to become president of the Supreme Court of Justice of the Nation. In 1890, he graduated with a law degree with his thesis entitled "Diplomatic Law". After graduating, he opened his own law firm.

== Political career ==
Due to the influences exerted by being known to Díaz and Romero, Sodi soon agreed to the position of prosecutor in a district court in Colima. There, he founded the magazine El Foro Colimense, which was responsible for the dissemination and opinion pieces on legal issues. In 1894, Sodi was assigned to the same position but now as district attorney promoter based in Santo Domingo Tehuantepec. The following year he moved to Mexico City to serve as an agent of the Public Ministry, in charge of the popular courts, a subject on which he focused his book published in the same year, The jury in Mexico.

By late 1906, Sodi was appointed as minister of the Supreme Court of Justice of the Nation, and two years later he was appointed President of the Court, where he voted on some occasions against the wishes of Porfirio Díaz. He held the position until 1910.

On March 25, 1911, Díaz named him Secretary of Justice after the resignation of Fernando Mondoño. During his short administration, he focused on investigating, through the Public Ministry of the Federation, the failures and negligence of public servants. Sodi lasted in office until May 25 of the same year, the date when Díaz was exiled from the country. He was the writer of the letter with which Díaz resigned as president. When Francisco I. Madero assumed the presidency, he was offered the position of Secretary of Justice, which he refused, arguing that the most consistent thing would be for him to reject it due to his past as a Porfirista official.

== Final years and death ==
After his retirement from politics, Sodi devoted himself to practicing his profession as a lawyer, as well as a writer on legal topics of great importance. His most famous defense was in the trial against José de León Toral, accused of perpetrating the murder of Álvaro Obregón and who was finally sentenced to death when Sodi denounced in his allegations violations of due process and following hearings mired in interventions and decrying.

Likewise, he occasionally worked as a professor at the National School of Jurisprudence and at Escuela Libre de Derecho, where he taught criminal law, civil law, and ethics.

Sodi died in Mexico City on October 29, 1934. His remains are in the Panteón de Dolores.

== Personal life ==
In 1889, Sodi married Carmen Pallares Portillo, daughter of Jacinto Pallares López, who was a friend of his. With his wife he had a total of twelve children, of whom nine survived beyond infancy. Some of his children who stood out were: Demetrio (cardiologist), María Elena (suffragist) and Ernesto (criminologist).
