= Francisco González de la Vega =

Mexican politician

Francisco González de la Vega e Iriarte (Durango, December 3, 1901 – Mexico City, March 3, 1976), Mexican jurist, he was Attorney General of the Republic (1946 to 1952), Governor of Durango (1956–1962) by Institutional Revolutionary Party (PRI). Ambassador of Mexico in Argentina (1967–1970) and in Portugal (1970–1971), Senator of the Republic, university professor at National Autonomous University of Mexico, and the Escuela Libre de Derecho, as well as author of several books like "Mexican criminal law".

In the position of Attorney-General of the Republic, he has been distinguished by his record, as Governor of the State of Durango he was considered of great benefit for the state. He is author of "The Criminal Code Commented", updated according to the Code's reforms and synchronized with the jurisprudence defined by the Supreme Court of Justice of the Nation and its Theses.

== See also ==
- Attorney General (Mexico)
- Governor of Durango

Preceded by José Aguilar y Maya	Attorney-General; 1946-1952	Succeeded by Carlos Franco Sodi
Preceded by Enrique Torres Sánchez	Governor of Durango; 1956-1962	Succeeded by Rafael Hernández Piedras
