= Jaime Zapata =

US agent

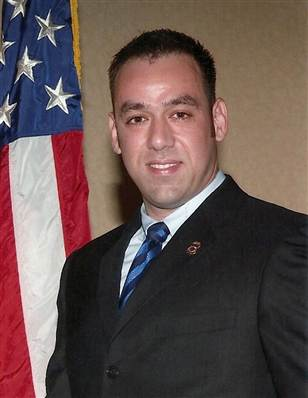
- U.S. Immigration and Customs Enforcement, Homeland Security Investigations Special Agent Jaime Zapata
- Born: May 7, 1978; Brownsville, Texas, U.S.
- Died: February 15, 2011 (aged 32); San Luis Potosí, Mexico
- Organization: Homeland Security Investigations

Jaime Jorge Zapata (May 7, 1978 – February 15, 2011) was an Immigration and Customs Enforcement, Homeland Security Investigations (ICE/HSI) Special Agent who was ambushed and murdered by the Mexican criminal group Los Zetas in San Luis Potosí, Mexico. He was one of two agents who were ambushed in a part of the country that was increasingly under the influence of drug violence. Zapata's death was the second high-profile killing of a U.S. agent in Mexico—the first one was Enrique Camarena, an undercover DEA agent who was tortured and murdered by the former Guadalajara Cartel.

== Early life and education ==
Zapata was born in Brownsville, Texas, United States, a border city directly north of Matamoros, Tamaulipas, Mexico. He was one of five brothers, all in the field of criminal justice. Zapata attended Homer Hanna High School, and later graduated from the University of Texas at Brownsville in 2005, where he attained a degree in Criminal Justice and an associate degree in Applied Science.

== Career ==
Zapata entered on duty with the United States Border Patrol (USBP) on February 6, 2006, as a Border Patrol Agent. Zapata was a member of the U.S. Border Patrol Academy's 611th Session. After his graduation Zapata was assigned to the Border Patrol Yuma Station in Yuma, Arizona. Zapata then joined the United States Immigration and Customs Enforcement (ICE) in 2006, after being assigned to the Office of the Deputy (DSS) special agent in Laredo, Texas, where he served on the Human Smuggling and Trafficking Unit and in the Border Enforcement Security Task Force.

== Death ==
Two U.S. Homeland Security Investigations special agents, Jaime Zapata and Víctor Ávila, were traveling from Laredo, Texas to Mexico City on an assignment for U.S. Immigration and Customs Enforcement. As they drove through the northern state of San Luis Potosí, the agents noticed two SUVs following them down Highway 57, a four-lane, federal highway from Mexico City to Monterrey. The two vehicles that came up behind them were at a high speed, and were described as driving "aggressively," according to agent Ávila. One vehicle passed the agents’ Suburban, while other gunmen started to fire at their vehicle, and eventually rammed them off the road. As one of the agents rolled down the window to inform them that they were U.S. diplomats, the agent recalled how one of the gunmen got off his vehicle, with a rifle in his hand, forced the door of the agents’ car open and shot point blank at them. When Zapata shifted the vehicle into park, its doors automatically unlocked. The Zeta gunmen pulled open the driver's side door and tried to drag Zapata out, but he fought them off, managing to re-lock the doors. The agents, however, managed to crack the windows to talk with the assailants and identify themselves. The agents hoped to reason with the gunmen—as many as 15 of them—who surrounded the vehicle. The agents then identified themselves as U.S. diplomats, but the gunmen responded with gunfire.

The gunmen then fled, and Ávila was able to use his cellphone to call for help. Dying, Zapata managed to put the car in gear and drive away before collapsing at the wheel. Soon afterwards, a Mexican federal police helicopter arrived where the two agents were. Ávila was shot twice in the leg, and was later sent to a hospital in Houston, Texas. Jaime Zapata, however, gravely injured from three bullet wounds, died before the authorities could aid him with medical treatment. According to federal sources, the ambush took place at a fake military checkpoint established by the gunmen, who were dressed in camouflage uniforms and armed with machine guns.

== Controversy ==
There has been controversy of whether this attack was from a group of Los Zetas carrying on their own operation, or whether this incident was a well-planned and intentional ambush attack against the American agents.

The captured individuals allegedly involved in the attack revealed through their interviews that they had mistaken the agents for a rival drug cartel. The agent's account, however, mentions that the gunmen apparently knew that they were attacking U.S. law enforcement officers, since after Zapata mentioned that they were American diplomats, the Zetas said "We don't give a [expletive]" and shot both of them. Moreover, the diplomatic plates also indicated U.S. officials were on board. Texas Congressman Michael McCaul mentioned that the gunmen opened fire at the agents after they had identified themselves as U.S. diplomats.

Five months after the slaying of Jaime Zapata, a report from the White House noted that Zapata's family demanded to know the source of the weapons used in the attack. The gun that killed Zapata and wounded Víctor Ávila—a semi-automatic WASR-10—was purchased by Otilio Osorio in Dallas, Texas, the serial number obliterated, and smuggled into Mexico along with nine additional rifles. Congressional investigators have stated that Osorio was known by the ATF to be a straw purchaser months before he purchased the gun used to kill Zapata, leading them to question the Bureau's Operation Fast and Furious leading to the illegal purchase and export of the murder weapon.

Mexican functionaries mentioned that although their efforts have been significant, without full cooperation from the United States in preventing the drug consumption in the U.S., the flow of American weapons and of cash south of the border into the hands of the Mexican criminals, there will not be any significant improvement in dismantling the drug cartels. On another note, the slaying of Zapata has sparked a debate on whether U.S. agents in Mexico should be allowed to carry guns to defend themselves. President Felipe Calderón mentioned during his visit to Washington, D.C., on March 3, 2011, that "alternatives" would be examined with Congress to improve the security of U.S. agents working in Mexico.

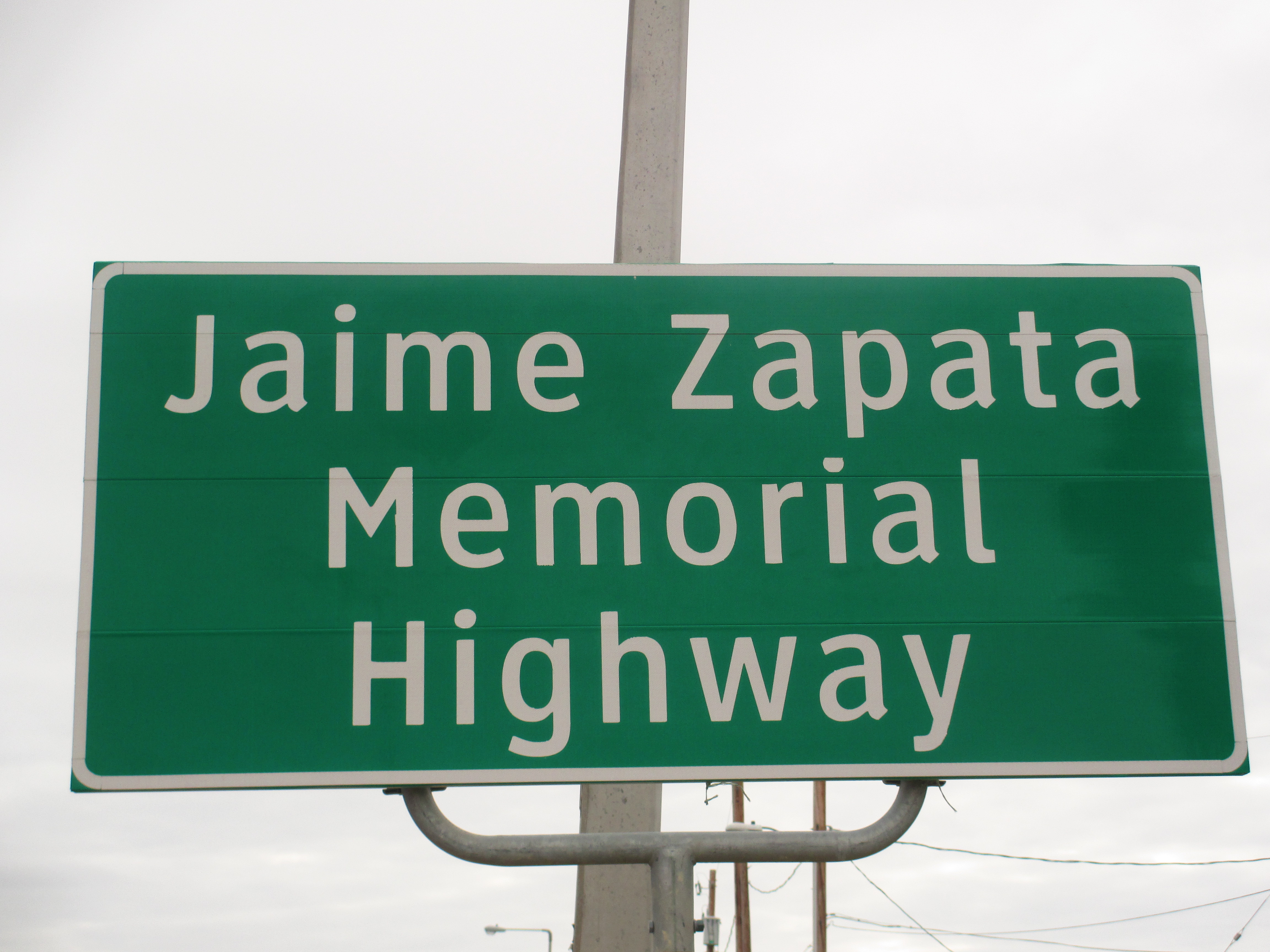
Laredo honors the memory of Jaime Zapata through the naming of the highway between U.S. 83 and Bob Bullock Loop 20.

== Aftermath ==
The death of Jaime Zapata allowed for the United States to work closely with officials on the Mexican-led investigation to ensure the perpetrators were captured as quickly as possible. Throughout the investigation, all the killers were eventually captured, including Jesús Enrique Rejón Aguilar, the third most powerful leader in Los Zetas and boss of the state where Zapata was killed. As tribute to Zapata, an avenue in Brownsville was renamed after him.

== Reactions ==
- – Barack Obama: "The United States will work with Mexico to bring the assailants to justice."
- – Janet Napolitano: "Let me be clear: Any act of violence against our ICE personnel — or any DHS personnel — is an attack against all those who serve our nation and put their lives at risk for our safety."
- – Michael McCaul: "The United States will not tolerate acts of violence against its citizens or law enforcement and I believe we must respond forcefully."
- – Pat Ahumada: "I am angered by this and frustrated that the Mexican government is not providing security to our agents while we are trying to help them. Criminals have the firepower in Mexico."
- – Felipe Calderón: "His death must urge us to work together to ensure a prosperous and peaceful future for our region." "One of those weapons [of Operation Fast and Furious] was the one that killed officer Zapata, an American agent in Mexico... the American agencies should stop the criminal flow of arms into Mexico."
- – Fernando Toranzo Fernández: "We will use all our judicial and investigational instruments to find those responsible."
- – Alejandro Poiré: "The President said it before: there's a huge demand of drugs in the U.S., and Mexico is the corridor for that market. The flow of weapons to Mexico from the United States are acquired by the Mexican drug cartels. That generates violence."
