= Humberto Benítez Treviño =

Mexican lawyer and politician

Humberto Benítez Treviño (born 5 July 1945) is a Mexican lawyer and politician. He was Attorney General of México from 1994 to 1996.

Legal offices
Preceded by Diego Valadés	Attorney General of Mexico; 1994	Succeeded by Antonio Lozano Gracia
