= Marisela Morales (lawyer) =

Mexican lawyer and Attorney General

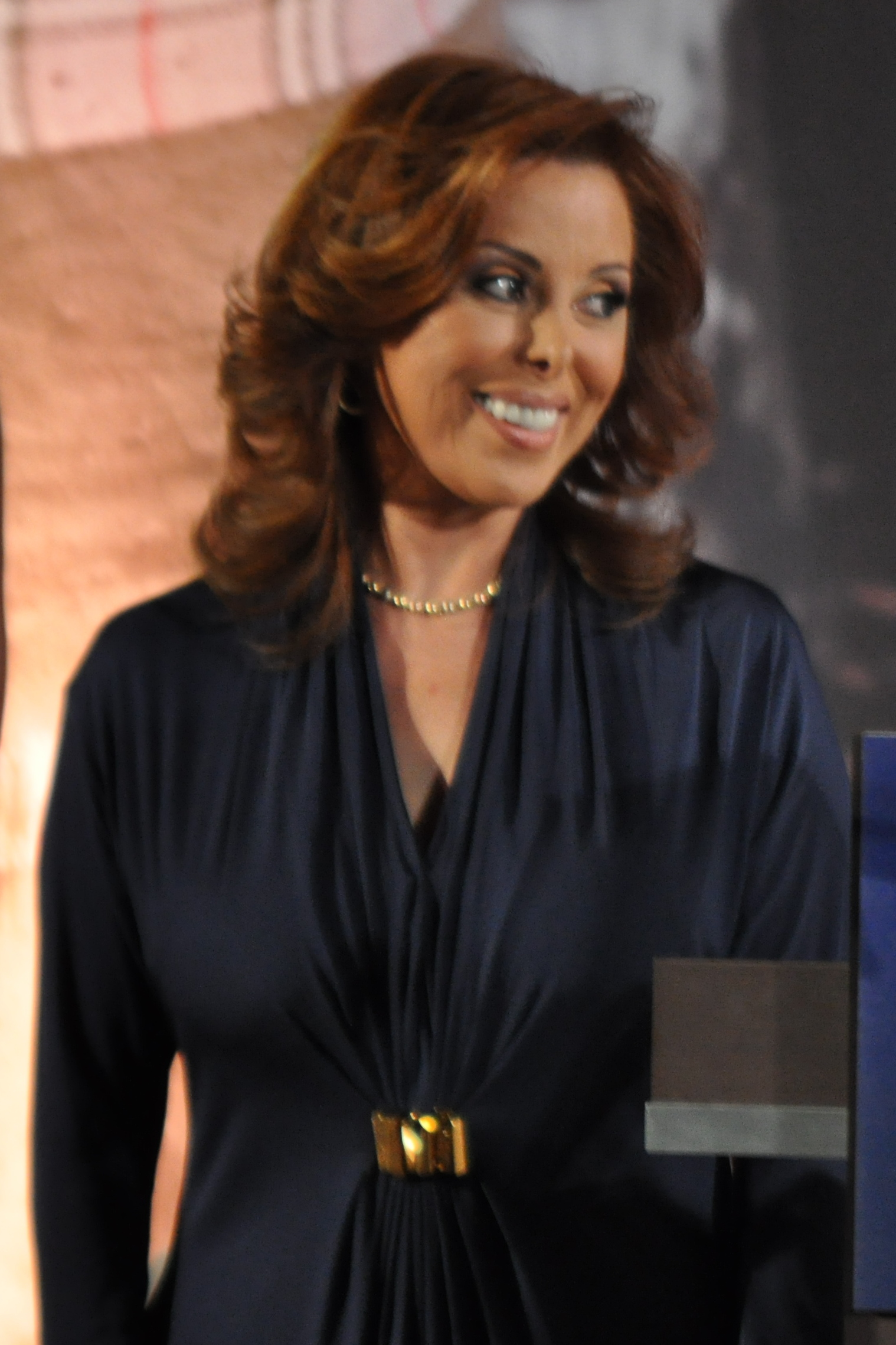
- Morales in 2011

Attorney General of Mexico
- In office 1 April 2011 – 30 November 2011
- President: Felipe Calderón
- Preceded by: Arturo Chávez
- Succeeded by: Jesús Murillo Karam

Personal details
- Born: Marisela Morales Ibáñez; 1 March 1970 (age 56) Mexico City
- Education: National Autonomous University of Mexico
- Awards: International Women of Courage Award (2011)

Marisela Morales Ibáñez (born 1 March 1970) is a Mexican lawyer who served as Attorney General of Mexico in 2011.

== Life ==
She was born in Mexico City and graduated from the National Autonomous University of Mexico with a degree in law before completing a master's degree in criminal science from the National Institute of Criminal Sciences.

On 31 March 2011, she was appointed by President Felipe Calderón to replace Arturo Chávez as attorney general. Upon being confirmed by the Senate, she became the 42nd attorney general and the first woman to hold the position.

Before she was appointed attorney general, she served as Assistant Attorney General for Specialized Investigation of Organized Crime. She has been praised for her work by United States Secretary of State Hillary Clinton and First Lady Michelle Obama and received the 2011 International Women of Courage Award.
