= Kenneth E. Melson =

American government official

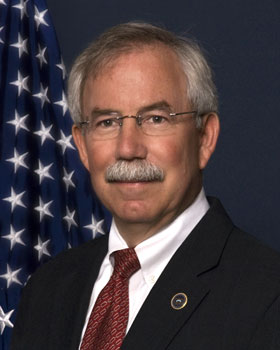

Acting Director of the Bureau of Alcohol, Tobacco, Firearms and Explosives
- In office April 8, 2009 – August 30, 2011
- Appointed by: Eric Holder
- Preceded by: Michael J. Sullivan (acting); Ronald "Ronnie" A. Carter (acting)
- Succeeded by: B. Todd Jones

Personal details
- Education: Denison University (BA), George Washington University (JD)

Kenneth E. Melson is a former acting director of the Bureau of Alcohol, Tobacco, Firearms and Explosives (ATF) in the United States. He was appointed to this post by Attorney General Eric Holder in 2009. He resigned as head of ATF in the aftermath of the ATF gunwalking scandal and was replaced by B. Todd Jones, a former Marine who had twice served as the U.S. attorney in Minnesota.

== Career ==
Prior to joining the Department of Justice, Melson served in the Arlington County (Virginia) Commonwealth’s Attorney’s Office from April 1975-June 1983. Melson joined the Commonwealth’s Attorney’s Office as an Assistant Commonwealth’s Attorney in April 1975. In January 1978, he was promoted to a managerial position as the Chief Assistant Commonwealth’s Attorney for Arlington County. In July 1980, Melson was again promoted to the position of Deputy Commonwealth’s Attorney for Arlington County, a position in which he served until June 1983.

Melson served in the United States Department of Justice as a federal prosecutor for nearly 24 years, joining the U.S. Attorney’s Office for the Eastern District of Virginia in June 1983 as an Assistant U.S. Attorney. In June 1986, Melson was asked to serve in a senior leadership position at the office as the First Assistant U.S. Attorney. Additionally, Melson also served as the Interim U.S. Attorney for the Eastern District of Virginia on three separate occasions: July 1991-October 1991; March 1993-September 1993; and April 2001-September 2001.

From 2003 to 2004 he was President of the American Academy of Forensic Sciences, and served as a member of its Ethics Committee and of the editorial board for the Journal of Forensic Sciences.

Melson was appointed by Attorney General Alberto Gonzales as Director of the Executive Office for United States Attorneys (EOUSA) at the Department of Justice effective on May 14, 2007.

After Melson resigned as head of ATF on August 30, 2011, he continued being employed by the US Department of Justice, re-assigned to the Office of Legal Policy as their Senior Adviser on Forensic Science. He currently serves on the Ethics Committee for the American Academy of Forensic Science and sits on the editorial board of the Journal of Forensic Sciences. Melson has been teaching at George Washington University for 35 years, first as an adjunct professor teaching forensic science and law courses, and currently as Professional Lecturer at Law.

== See also ==
- Mexican drug war
