= Arturo Chávez Chávez =

Mexican politician

Attorney General (Mexico)
- In office 24 September 2009 – 31 March 2011
- President: Felipe Calderón
- Preceded by: Eduardo Medina Mora
- Succeeded by: Marisela Morales

Attorney General of Chihuahua
- In office 1996–1998
- Governor: Francisco Barrio

Personal details
- Born: 4 September 1960 (age 66) Mexico
- Party: National Action Party
- Education: Monterrey Institute of Technology, Chihuahua Campus
- Occupation: Lawyer

Arturo Chávez Chávez (born 4 September 1960) is a Mexican prosecutor who served as Attorney General of Mexico in the cabinet of President Felipe Calderón from 24 September 2009 until 31 March 2011. He previously served as Attorney General of Chihuahua during the governorship of Francisco Barrio.

He has also worked as chief advisor to former Senator Diego Fernández de Cevallos, as Undersecretary of Legal Affairs and Human Rights at the Secretariat of the Interior and as former envoy of the secretariat during the 2006 Oaxaca protests.

== Chávez as Attorney General ==
His nomination to the post of Attorney General by President Felipe Calderón on 7 September 2009 was received with harsh criticism from some human rights activists and relatives of the victims of the female homicides in Ciudad Juárez, Chihuahua, who, according to William Booth of The Washington Post'', claim he did little during his years as Attorney General of the state to solve the killings of hundreds of women in the 1990s.

Chávez was required by law to testify before the Senate before assuming office. According to Ken Ellingwood of the Los Angeles Times, his party held a numerical advantage in the 128-seat legislative chamber but lacked a clear majority, so it needed to reach for votes across the aisle. During the session, Chávez expressed his opposition to the death penalty, though the Ecologist Green Party had strongly campaigned for its implementation—and cannabis legalization, which the Senate as a whole had recently voted to decriminalize in small amounts for personal use. In the end, his nomination was confirmed with 75 votes in favor, 26 against (mostly from the political left), and one abstention. However, his appointment was criticised by the United States in a leaked diplomatic cable as "unexpected and inexplicable".

Chávez resigned on 31 March 2011 after 18 months as Attorney General, citing personal reasons, three weeks after the U.S. cable was made public. President Calderón described Chávez's work in office as having "been fundamental to Mexico's efforts to establish rule of law", and said Chávez was the reason many cartel leaders had now faced justice. Calderón has appointed Marisela Morales, head of the organized crime department in the Office of the General Prosecutor, as Chávez's successor.

== Alleged organized crime infiltration ==
According to a leaked diplomatic cable issued in September 2009, the United States government received information from "unpublished sources" that Chávez was allegedly infiltrated with a drug cartel in Chihuahua during his term as Attorney General. The cables mention that Carlos Pascual, the former U.S. ambassador in Mexico, sent the information of Chávez's collaboration with the organized crime groups to United States Department of State. Nevertheless, nothing about the former state Attorney General relationship with the drug cartels was confirmed.
