= Chris Heffelfinger =

American writer

Chris Heffelfinger (born 1979) is a researcher and writer based in Washington, D.C.. He is the editor of Unmasking Terror: A Global Review of Terrorist Activities. This is a two-volume work published by the Jamestown Foundation. He is also the author of Radical Islam in America: Salafism's Journey from Arabia to the West. He specializes in contemporary and classical Islamic thought.
