= Thomas B. Heffelfinger =

American lawyer (born 1948)

Thomas B. Heffelfinger (born 1948) is an attorney in private practice in Minneapolis, Minnesota. He was the U.S. Attorney for Minnesota from 1991 to 1993 and from 2001 to 2006. He served as assistant U.S. Attorney from 1982 to 1988 and assistant Hennepin County Attorney from 1976 to 1982.

== Early life ==
Heffelfinger received his B.A. from Stanford University in 1970, and his J.D. from the University of Minnesota Law School in 1975.

== U.S. Attorney ==
=== Indian Affairs ===
Investigation of the shooting deaths of 10 people at a school at the Red Lake Indian Reservation on March 21, 2005, absorbed much of his time in the subsequent 11 months.

=== Dismissal of U.S. Attorneys controversy ===
2006 dismissal of U.S. attorneys controversy
- Timeline
- Summary of attorneys
- Congressional hearings
- List of dismissed attorneys
- All related articles

Heffelfinger resigned on February 28, 2006, for personal reasons, and he was replaced by Rachel Paulose. The Minneapolis Star-Tribune reported that it was unusual that "the former U.S. attorney for Minnesota, Thomas Heffelfinger, was not invited" to Paulose's swearing-in ceremony. Paulose's spokesperson, Jeanne Cooney, said, "It was a public event. Anybody who wanted to go could have gone." The article speculates that Heffelfinger, a moderate Republican, could have been a candidate for dismissal had he not stepped aside to make way for a more conservative candidate.

Heffelfinger was angry at the Department of Justice for targeting him for dismissal because of his preoccupation with Indian affairs issues. Heffelfinger strongly defended that work: "The fact that some allegedly responsible official or officials in Washington at main Justice now believe that I should have been removed for spending too much time focused on the public safety of Native Americans is outrageous, and it's shameful."

Circumstantial evidence suggests that Heffelfinger was targeted for dismissal as a consequence of his positions on tribal voting in Minnesota. Heffelfinger's appearance on potential dismissal lists at the Department of Justice apparently fits a pattern associating the dismissed attorneys and voting issues. The names of Bradley Schlozman and Hans A. von Spakovsky also appear in this case; Schlozman was a central figure in a voting and elections controversy in Missouri.

== Private practice ==
After his resignation as U.S. Attorney, Heffelfinger was hired by the law firm Best and Flanagan, where he focuses on white-collar criminal defense and American Indian law.

== Opposition to President Donald Trump ==
In October 2020, Heffelfinger signed a letter, along with 19 other Republican-appointed former U.S. Attorneys, calling President Donald Trump "a threat to the rule of law in our country" and endorsing Joe Biden.
