= Benito Juárez Autonomous University of Oaxaca =

University in Mexico

- Universidad Autónoma Benito Juárez de Oaxaca
- Former names: Institute of Sciences and Arts of Oaxaca
- Motto: Ciencia, Arte, Libertad ("Science, Art, Freedom")
- Type: Public university
- Established: January 8, 1827; 199 years ago
- President: Rafael Torres Valdez
- Students: 20,360 (2021-2022)
- Location: Oaxaca de Juárez, Mexico; 17°02′53″N 96°42′44″W
- Campus: Urban
- Colors: Blue & Gold
- Website: www.uabjo.mx

The Benito Juárez Autonomous University of Oaxaca (Spanish: Universidad Autónoma Benito Juárez de Oaxaca, UABJO) is a public university located in the city of Oaxaca de Juárez in the state of Oaxaca, Mexico.

The university was founded on January 8, 1827, as the Institute of Sciences and Arts of Oaxaca. Initially courses were offered in Medicine, Surgery, Civil and Natural Law, Public Law, Canon Law and Ecclesiastical History, Political Economy, Statistics, Geography and Physics, Mathematics, Logic, Ethics, English, and French.

== History ==
Its first antecedent dates from August 26, 1825, as the Institute of Sciences and Arts of Oaxaca under the decree of the then governor Ignacio Morales, with the protection of the local congress, but it was not until January 1827 that it opened its doors on San Nicolás street, today Independencia Avenue, being Fray Francisco de Aparicio, a priest of liberal ideas, its first rector.

In 1845 the institute stopped offering the ecclesiastical career and favored that of law and medicine, later creating that of Political Economy. In 1852, the careers of Pharmacy and Political Economy were added. In 1862, the Lithography and Typography classes were founded and it is in 1874 when the Administration career is established.

At the end of 1931, the institute obtained its autonomy and ceases to depend on the education section of the government. However, it only acquired complete autonomy until December 1943. The word "Autonomous" would not be part of the university's name until later.

At the end of 1954, a proposal was made for the institute to be elevated to the rank of a university, and by decree it was established on January 17, 1955, as the Benito Juárez University of Oaxaca.

== 2006 Oaxaca protests ==
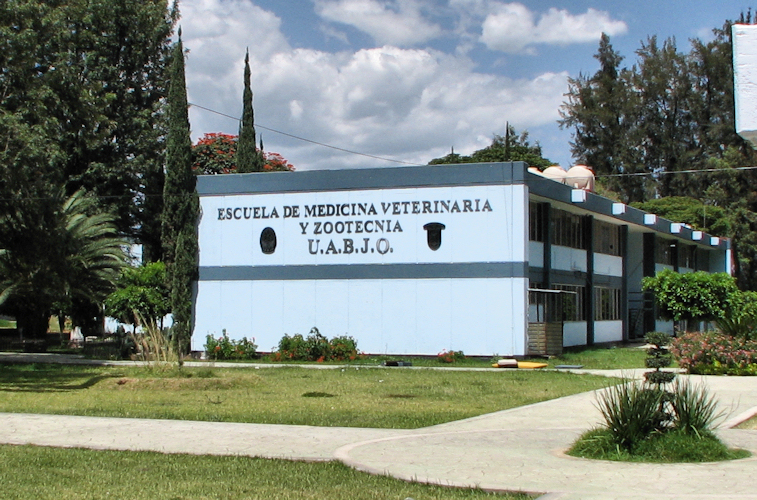
The school of Veterinary & Zoological Medicine on the main campus of UABJO.

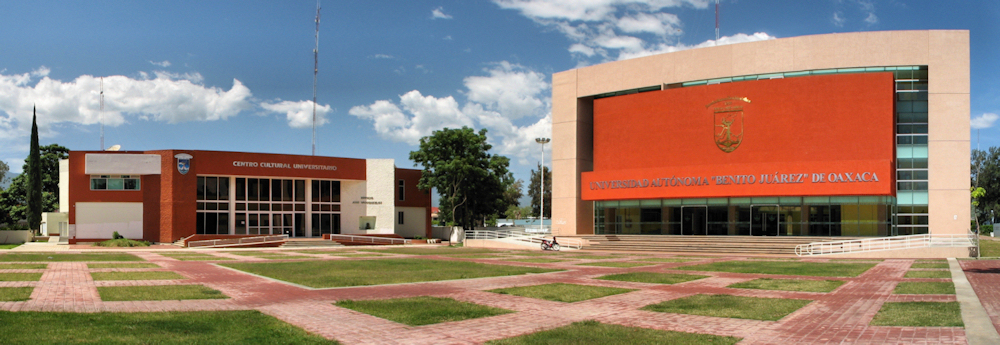
Panoramic photo of the Centro Cultural Universitario & Rectoria on the main campus of UABJO.

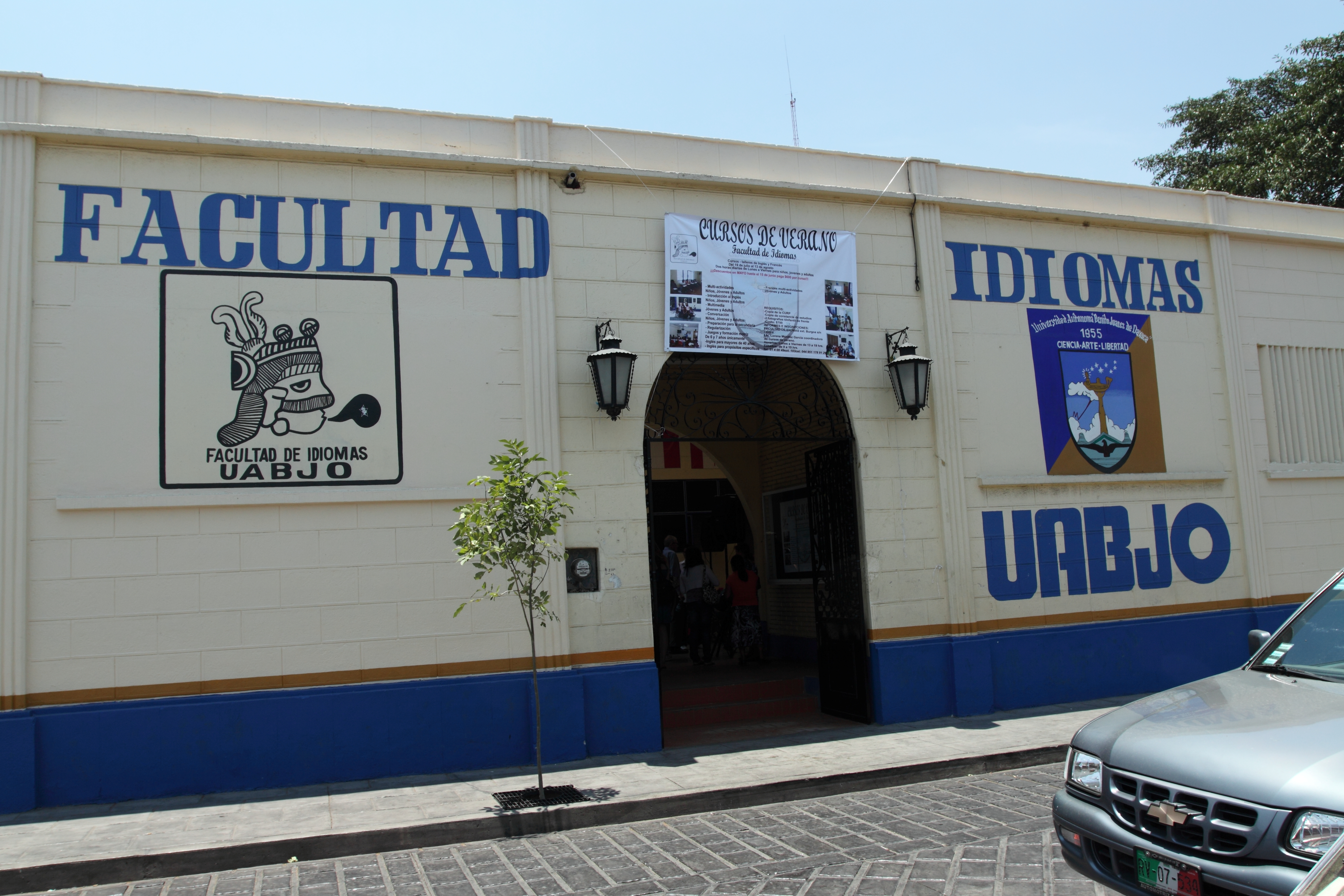
The UABJO School of Languages campus, located near downtown.

In May 2006, a teachers' strike began in the Zócalo in the Mexican city of Oaxaca, Oaxaca. The year 2006 was the 25th consecutive year that Oaxaca's teachers went on strike. Previously, protests had generally lasted for one to two weeks and had resulted in small raises for teachers. The 2006 strike began in protest of the low funding for teachers and rural schools in the state, but was prompted to additionally call for the resignation of the state governor Ulises Ruiz Ortiz after 3000 police were sent to break up the occupation in the early morning of June 14, 2006. A street battle lasted for several hours that day, resulting in more than one hundred hospitalizations but no fatalities. Ortiz declared that he would not resign.

On November 2, 2006, Federal Preventative Police advanced on the university, occupied by students and displaced protesters from the Zocalo. Since the university is autonomous, the police are forbidden from entering the grounds, unless invited by the rector.

Thousands of protesters arrived in the following hours, surrounding the police and eventually forcing them to withdraw from the area surrounding the university. The Asamblea Popular de los Pueblos de Oaxaca had received permission by the university rector to broadcast their messages through the university radio, which they used to criticise political parties, the Institutional Revolutionary Party specifically. Opinions against the APPO were quickly taken off the air

After criticism by the private sector, political organizations and the press (specifically Grupo Formula's news anchor Denise Maerker) for his remarks towards the APPO the rector declared that he had requested respect for the rights of students and faculty and that an operational attempt by the Federal Police would not provide a solution to the issue.

== Faculty of Languages ==
The Faculty of Languages at Benito Juárez Autonomous University of Oaxaca is a major focus of the university's scholarship with campuses in Oaxaca City, Tehuantepec and Puerto Escondido. While the faculty has traditionally focused on European lanaguages (especially English), in the 2010s the faculty began to focus more heavily on Indigenous language instruction and education and the faculty has since specialised in the instruction of Isthmus Zapotec. This shift was especially evident in the Tehuantepec campus.

In 2012, the bachelor program was renamed from Idiomas extranjeras con especialización en Inglés (Foreign languages with a specialisation in English) to the broader Enseñanza de Idiomas (Language Teaching/Learning). In 2013, the Tehuantepec began offering public courses in Isthmus Zapotec, available to students and members of the public and have since become incorporated into the bacehlor's program, with the university offering certification for Zapotec teachers.

These initiatives have helped to represent Indigenous languages as legitimate academic subjects and to challenge the notion that many indigenous languages are dialectos and "not for teaching".

Currently, the university offers 4-levels of courses in Isthmus Zapotec, and has at various points offered courses in the endangered Huave language, though low enrollment rates have prevented the faculty from continuing to offer it.

== Current status ==
Through an agreement with the Universidad Nacional Autónoma de México (UNAM) the CEC (Center for Continuing Education) was established, that allows the university to offer additional baccalaureate degrees in conjunction with UNAM.

== Notable alumni ==
=== Mexican presidents ===
- Benito Juárez (1858–1872)
- Porfirio Díaz (1876–1880 & 1884–1911)

=== Others ===
- Demetrio Sodi Guergué (president of the Supreme Court of Justice of the Nation, 1908–1910)
- Matías Romero Avendaño (diplomat)
