= Bosco Sodi =

Mexican contemporary artist

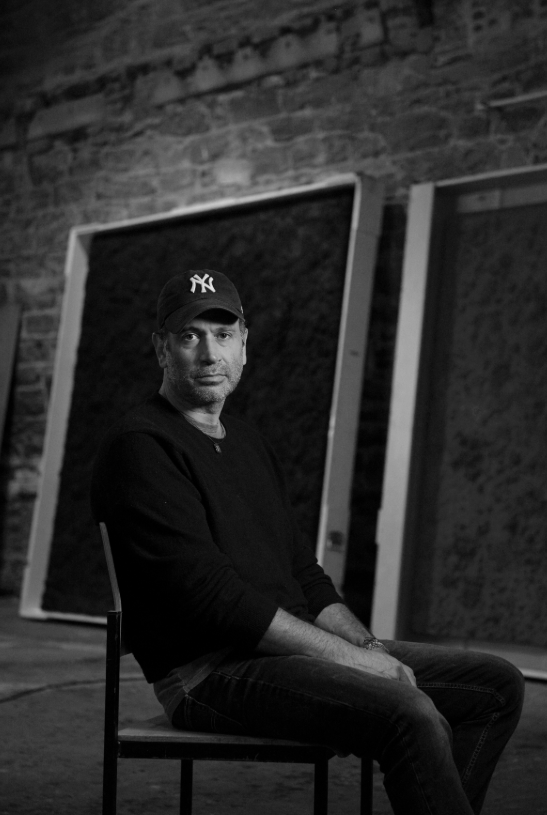
Bosco Sodi Bosco Sodi Portrait
- Born: November 28, 1970 (age 55); Mexico City, Mexico
- Known for: Painting, sculpture, installation art

Bosco Sodi (born November 28, 1970) is a Mexican contemporary artist known for his large-scale paintings, clay sculptures, and site-specific installations. His work incorporates natural materials and processes that emphasize texture, material transformation, and chance.

Sodi has exhibited internationally at institutions including the Harvard Art Museums, the Dallas Museum of Art, the Bronx Museum of the Arts, Museo Jumex, and the Museo Nacional de Arte.

In 2014, he founded Fundación Casa Wabi, an arts organization and residency program located on the Pacific coast of Oaxaca, Mexico.

== Biography ==
Bosco Sodi was born in Mexico City in 1970. Before pursuing a career in visual art, he studied business. He has lived and worked in Mexico, the United States, and Europe.

In 2012, Sodi's studio in Red Hook, Brooklyn, was severely damaged during Hurricane Sandy. A large body of work and materials was destroyed by flooding. Some of the damaged sculptures later became the basis for works exhibited at the Bronx Museum of the Arts.

Sodi lives and works between New York, Oaxaca, and Barcelona.

== Work ==
Sodi's work incorporates materials including pigment, sawdust, wood pulp, natural fibers, clay, and earth. His paintings are created through accumulations of material that dry and crack over time, producing textured surfaces.

Writers and curators have associated his practice with ideas of imperfection, material transformation, and the Japanese aesthetic philosophy of wabi-sabi.

Since the 2010s, Sodi has produced large-scale ceramic sculptures in Oaxaca using locally sourced clay and traditional firing methods. Many of these works are dried outdoors and fired in open-air kilns.

== Projects and installations ==
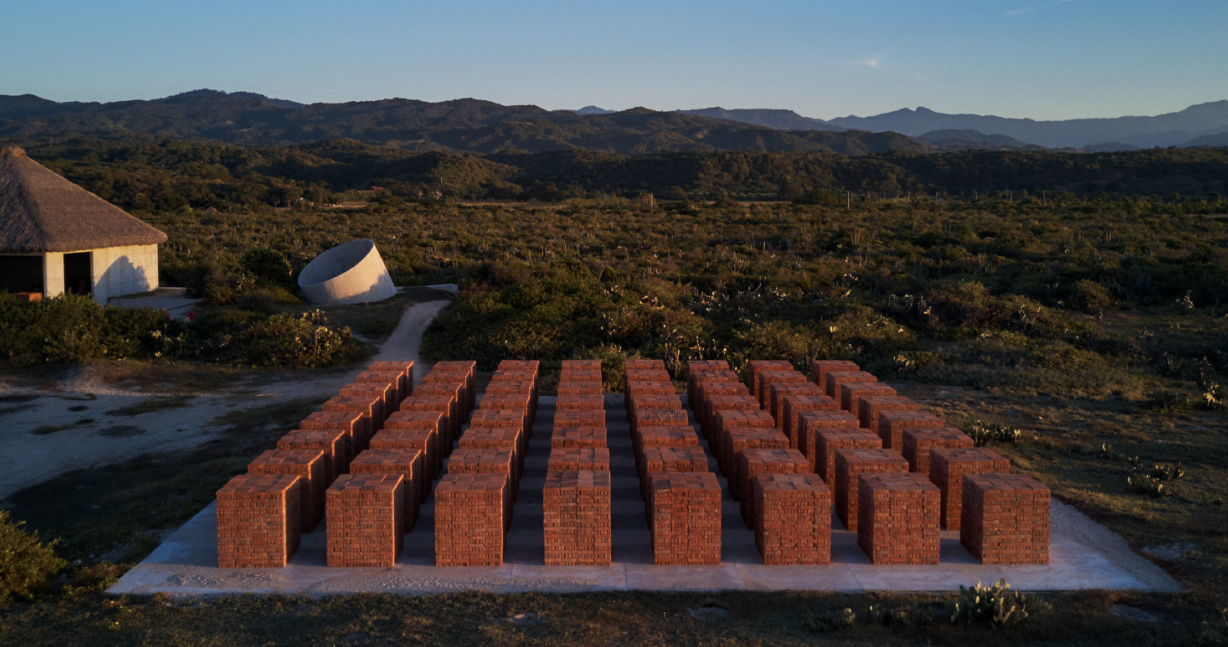
Bosco Sodi, Atlantes, 2019

- Muro (2017) was a temporary public installation in Washington Square Park, New York City, consisting of approximately 1,600 handmade clay bricks produced in Oaxaca. The structure was dismantled on the same day and visitors were invited to take individual bricks.
- Atlantes (2019) was a large-scale installation composed of monumental clay figures exhibited in Puerto Escondido, Oaxaca.
- Origen (2023–2024), presented at the Harvard Art Museums, consisted of handmade clay spheres installed throughout the museum and its outdoor terrace.

== Selected exhibitions ==
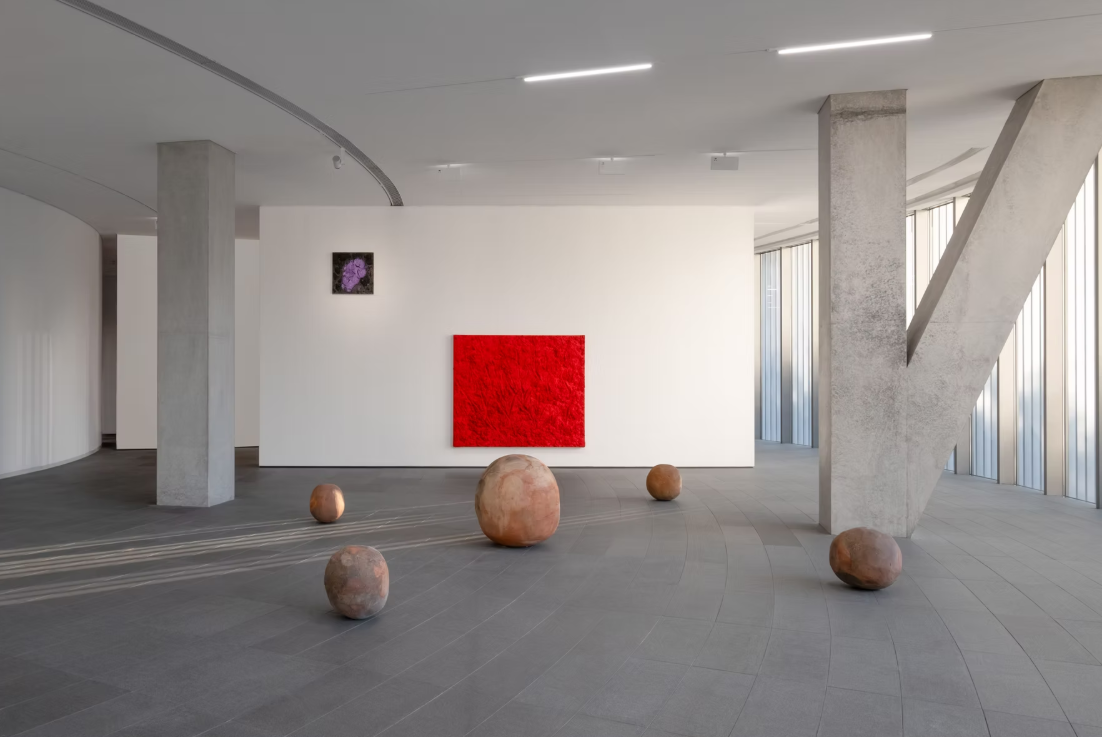
Beyond Wilderness, He Art Museum, Guangdong, China (2024–2025)

- Beyond Wilderness, He Art Museum, Guangdong, China (2024–2025).
- When I Saw My Reflection, Desert X AlUla, Saudi Arabia (2024).
- Galaxy, Scai the Bathhouse, Tokyo (2023).
- Bosco Sodi: La fuerza del destino, Dallas Museum of Art, Dallas (2021–2022).
- Vital, Museo Nacional de Arte, Mexico City (2019).
- Bosco Sodi: Untitled, The Bronx Museum of the Arts, New York (2014–2015).

== Collections ==
Sodi's work is held in public and private collections including:

- Harvard Art Museums
- Museo Jumex
- Museo Nacional de Arte
- Nasher Sculpture Center
- Walker Art Center
- Phillips Collection
- New Orleans Museum of Art
- Museum of Contemporary Art San Diego
- Wadsworth Atheneum Museum of Art

== Fundación Casa Wabi ==
Fundación Casa Wabi is a nonprofit arts organization founded by Sodi in Oaxaca, Mexico. The foundation operates residency programs, exhibitions, educational initiatives, and community-based projects.

The foundation's main building was designed by Japanese architect Tadao Ando.

Architects who have contributed projects and pavilions at Casa Wabi include Álvaro Siza, Kengo Kuma, Alberto Kalach, Solano Benítez, Gloria Cabral, and OMA.

== Publications ==
- Hart, Dakin; Bonet, Juan Manuel (2020). Bosco Sodi. New York: Rizzoli.
- Matter and Memory: The Art of Bosco Sodi (2016). New York: Skira Rizzoli.
- Bosco Sodi: La fuerza del destino (2021). Dallas: Dallas Museum of Art.
