= Attorney General of Mexico =

Responsible for the investigation and prosecution of federal crimes

- Fiscalía General de la República
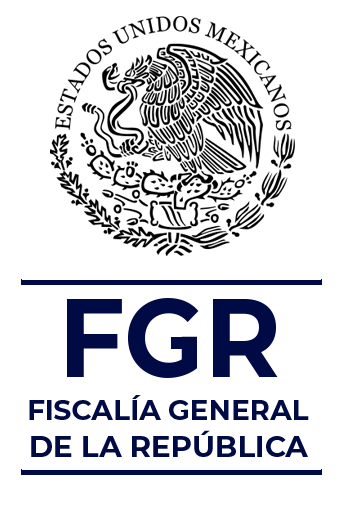
- Seal of the attorney general's office

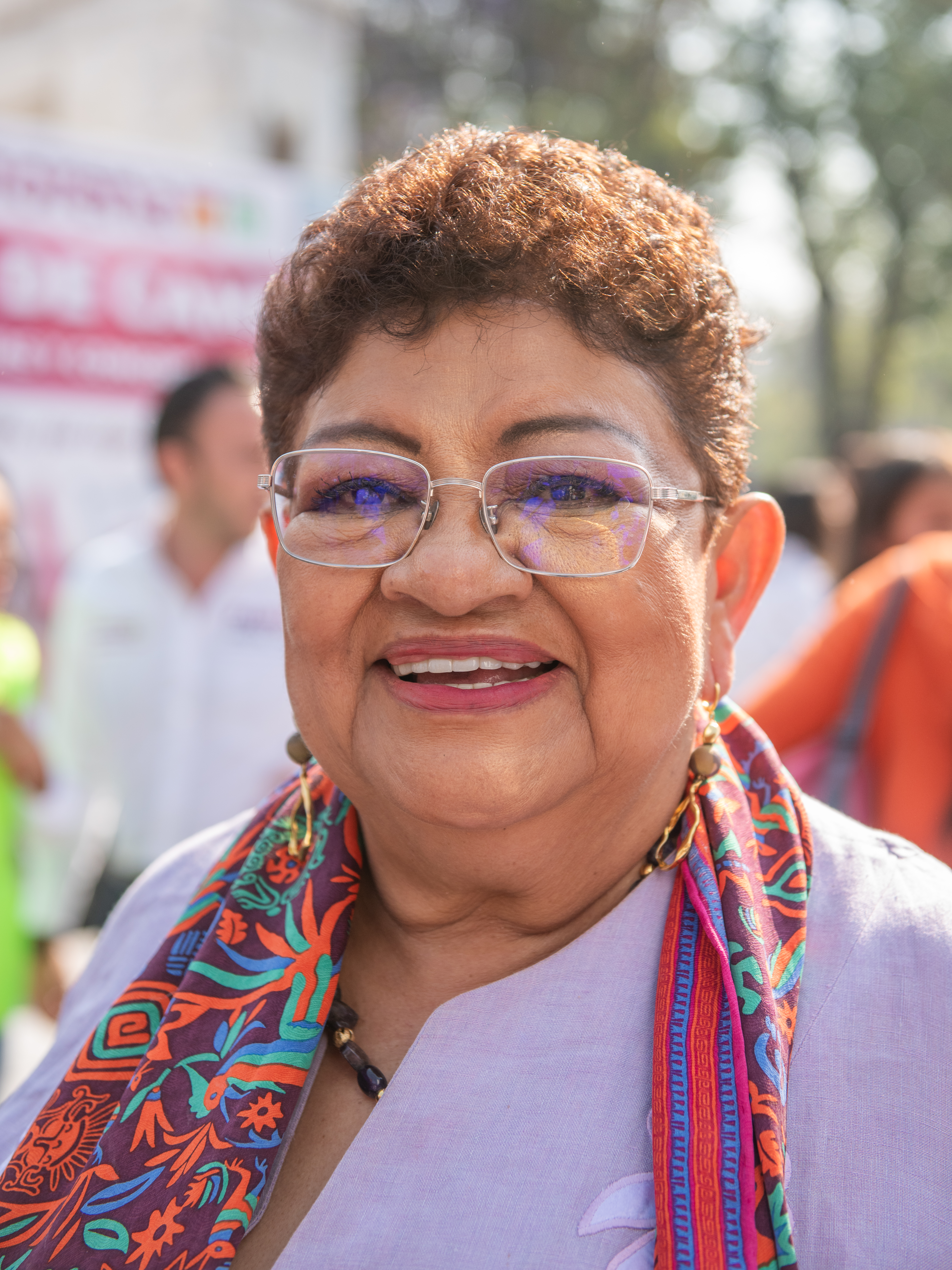
- Incumbent; Ernestina Godoy Ramos since December 3, 2025
- First holder: Pablo de la Garza
- Website: www.fgr.org.mx

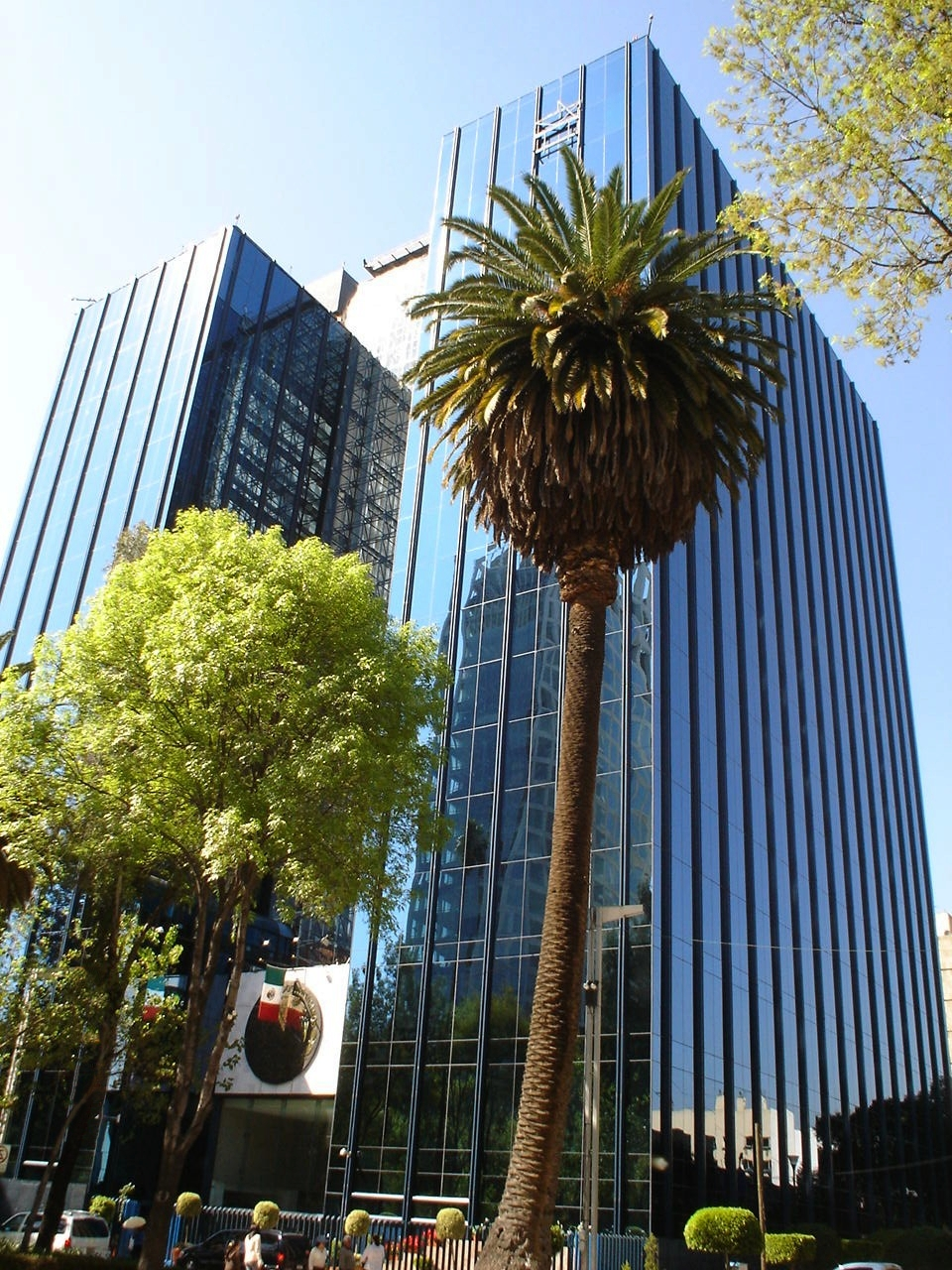
Former headquarters of the FGR on Paseo de la Reforma, in Mexico City.

The attorney general of the Republic is the head of the Attorney General's Office (Fiscalía General de la República, FGR; prior to 2019, Procuraduría General de la República, PGR) and the Federal Public Prosecutor's Office of the United Mexican States, an institution belonging to the federal government's constitutional autonomous organism that is responsible for the investigation and prosecution of federal crimes.

The office is governed mainly by article 102 of the 1917 Constitution and the Organic Law of the Attorney General's Office (Ley Orgánica de la Fiscalía General de la República).

== Organization ==
The Attorney General's Office is organized into several subordinate entities, including eight Specialized Prosecutor Offices (Competition Control, Regional Control, Organized Crime, Election-related Crimes, Corruption, Human Rights, Crimes of Violence against Women and Human Trafficking, and Internal Affairs), Criminal Investigation Agency (Federal Ministerial Police, General Coordination of Expert Services (CGSP) and the National Center for Planning, Analysis and Information for Combating Crime (CENAPI)), Specialized Body for Alternative Dispute Resolution Mechanisms, Administrative office and Internal control organ.

== List of attorneys general ==
=== 21st century ===
- Ernestina Godoy Ramos (3 December 2025 – present)
- Ernestina Godoy Ramos (27 November 2025 – 2 December 2025; interim)
- Alejandro Gertz Manero (1 December 2018 – 27 November 2025)
- Alberto Elías Beltrán (16 October 2017 – 30 November 2018)
- Raúl Cervantes Andrade (26 October 2016 – 16 October 2017)
- Arely Gómez González (27 February 2015 – 26 October 2016)
- Jesús Murillo Karam (4 December 2012 – 27 February 2015)
- Marisela Morales (1 April 2011 – 4 December 2012)
- Arturo Chávez (24 September 2009 – 31 March 2011)
- Eduardo Medina Mora (1 December 2006 – 7 September 2009)
- Daniel Cabeza de Vaca (28 April 2005 – 30 November 2006)
- Rafael Macedo de la Concha (1 December 2000 – 27 April 2005)

=== 20th century ===
Attorneys general (1900–2000)
Name	Term of office
Rafael Rebollar	1900–1911
Manuel Castelazo Fuentes	1911–1911
Adolfo Valles	1911–1913
Francisco Modesto de Olaguíbel	1914–1914
Vicente Castro	1914
Pascual Morales y Molina	1916–1917
Pablo A. de la Garza	1917–1918
Carlos Salcedo	1918–1920
Eduardo Neri	1920–1922
Eduardo Delhumeau	1922–1924
Romeo Ortega y Castillo de Levín	1925–1928
Ezequiel Padilla Peñaloza	1928–1928
Enrique Medina	1928–1930
José Aguilar y Maya	1930–1932
Emilio Portes Gil	1932–1934
Silvestre Castro	1934–1936
Ignacio García Téllez	1936–1937
Antonio Villalobos Maillard	1937–1937
Genaro V. Vázquez Quiroz	1937–1940
José Aguilar y Maya	1940–1946
Francisco González de la Vega	1946–1952
Carlos Franco Sodi	1952–1956
Jose Aguilar y Maya	1956–1958
Fernando López Arias	1958–1962
Oscar Treviño Ríos	1962–1964
Antonio Rocha Cordero	1964–1967
Julio Sánchez Vargas	1967–1971
Pedro Ojeda Paullada	1971–1976
Óscar Flores Sánchez	1976–1982
Sergio García Ramírez	1982–1988
Enrique Álvarez del Castillo	1988–1991
Ignacio Morales Lechuga	1991–1993
Jorge Carpizo McGregor	1993–1994
Diego Valadés	1994–1994
Humberto Benítez Treviño	1994–1994
Antonio Lozano Gracia	1994–1996
Jorge Madrazo Cuéllar	1996–2000

== See also ==
- Justice ministry
- Law enforcement in Mexico
