= Dismissed U.S. attorneys summary =

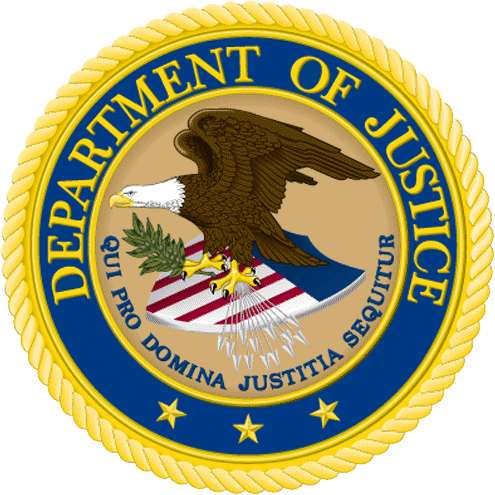

This article about dismissed U.S. attorneys summarizes the circumstances surrounding a number of U.S. attorneys dismissed from office in the United States Department of Justice in 2006. Eight were dismissed In December 2006, and others may have been forced out of office under similar circumstances in 2005 and 2006. The manner of the firings, the congressional response to them, and the explanations offered by Bush administration officials are aspects of a political controversy starting in the first quarter of 2007. As of May 2007 a clear explanation of why the attorneys were dismissed had not been put forward by the Bush administration or the Department of Justice leadership. There are in total 93 U.S. attorneys that serve 94 Federal district courts (two Pacific island territory districts share one attorney).

== List of dismissed attorneys ==
Seven attorneys were dismissed on December 7, 2006. Subsequent disclosures showed that two additional attorneys, Bud Cummins and Todd Graves, may have been dismissed under similar circumstances earlier in 2006. Bud Cummins is frequently associated with those dismissed on December 7 because he announced his resignation in mid-December, effective December 20, 2006. However, Cummins had been informed of his pending dismissal in June 2006. Cummins' dismissal received significant attention from the media and from congressional investigators after Deputy Attorney General Paul McNulty testified that his dismissal was requested from the White House in order to install Karl Rove protégé Timothy Griffin in his place. Both Todd Graves, and his replacement, Department of Justice official Bradley Schlozman, have been called to testify in the ongoing Senate investigation of the U.S. Attorney controversy.

Two U.S. Attorneys who were fired in 2005, Thomas M. DiBiagio and Kasey Warner, have made public statements claiming that there may be similarities between their dismissals and those of the nine attorneys fired in 2006. To date, their cases have received significantly less attention from the media in comparison to the attorneys fired in 2006.

Dismissed U.S. attorneys summary
Dismissed attorney		Effective date of resignation	Federal district	Replacement^{1}
Dismissed December 7, 2006
1.	David Iglesias	Dec 19, 2006	New Mexico	Larry Gomez
2.	Kevin V. Ryan	Jan 16, 2007	Northern California	Scott Schools
3.	John McKay	Jan 26, 2007	Western Washington	Jeffrey C. Sullivan
4.	Paul K. Charlton	Jan 31, 2007	Arizona	Daniel G. Knauss
5.	Carol Lam	Feb 15, 2007	Southern California	Karen Hewitt
6.	Daniel Bogden	Feb 28, 2007	Nevada	Steven Myhre
7.	Margaret Chiara	Mar 16, 2007	Western Michigan	Russell C. Stoddard
Others dismissed in 2006
1.	Todd Graves	Mar 24, 2006^{2}	Western Missouri	Bradley Schlozman^{6}
2.	Bud Cummins	Dec 20, 2006^{3}	Eastern Arkansas	Tim Griffin^{5}
Dismissed in 2005
1.	Thomas M. DiBiagio	Jan 2, 2005^{4}	Maryland	Allen F. Loucks
2.	Kasey Warner	Jul 2005^{4}	Southern W. Virginia	Charles T. Miller
^{1}Source: Department of Justice, U.S. Attorneys Offices^{2}Informed of dismissal January 2006.^{3}Informed of dismissal June 2006.^{4}Date resignation requested by the Department of Justice is unknown.^{5}Subsequently submitted resignation on May 30, 2007, effective June 1, 2007.^{6}Subsequently returned to positions at the Department of Justice in Washington

== David Iglesias ==
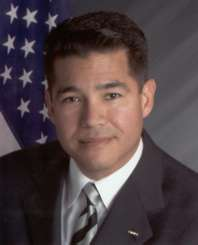
David Iglesias

Allen Weh, chairman of the New Mexico Republican Party, said he complained in 2005 about then-U.S. Attorney David Iglesias to a White House aide for Karl Rove, asking that Iglesias be removed. Then in 2006 Rove personally told Weh "He's gone." Weh was dissatisfied with Iglesias due in part to his failure to indict Democrats in a voter fraud investigation. Weh followed up with, "There's nothing we've done that's wrong." In March 2007, the White House spokeswoman, Dana Perino, said Rove "wasn't involved in who was going to be fired or hired." However, one of the stated reasons for Iglesias' dismissal, by Administration officials, was dissatisfaction in his prosecution of voter-fraud cases. Nevertheless, Iglesias "had been heralded for his expertise in that area by the Justice Department, which twice selected him to train other federal prosecutors to pursue election crimes" and was "one of two chief federal prosecutors invited to teach at a 'voting integrity symposium' in October 2005... sponsored by Justice's public integrity and civil rights sections."

In February 2007 Iglesias publicly alleged that "two lawmakers called him about a well-known criminal investigation involving a Democratic legislator" and that "the lawmakers who called him seemed focused on whether charges would be filed before the November elections. He said the calls made him feel 'pressured to hurry the subsequent cases and prosecutions.'" (U.S. Attorneys in Arizona, Nevada and California were also conducting corruption probes involving Republicans at the time of their dismissals.) According to and later confirmed prior to the 2006 midterm election, Heather Wilson and Pete Domenici called and "pressured" Iglesias "to speed up indictments in a federal corruption investigation that involved at least one former Democratic state senator." When Iglesias told Domenici that an indictment wouldn't be handed down until at least December, Iglesias said "the line went dead," and he was fired one week later by the Bush administration. After initially denying the call, Domenici admitted making it in March 2007. According to The Washington Post, "A communication by a senator or House member with a federal prosecutor regarding an ongoing criminal investigation is a violation of ethics rules." Domenici admitted calling Iglesias despite the initial denial, but Domenici said he never used the word "November" when he called Iglesias about an ongoing Albuquerque courthouse corruption case. Domenici has denied trying to influence Iglesias, and has hired lawyer K. Lee Blalack II to represent him. According to the Justice Department, Domenici called the department and demanded Iglesias be replaced on four occasions. On the day that Iglesias was fired, Harriet Miers' deputy William Kelley wrote that Domenici's chief of staff "is happy as a clam" about Iglesias and a week later Sampson wrote that "Domenici is going to send over names tomorrow (not even waiting for Iglesias's body to cool)."

Rep. Heather Wilson also called and "pressured New Mexico U.S. attorney David Iglesias to speed up indictments in a federal corruption investigation that involved at least one former Democratic state senator. Wilson was curt after Iglesias was non-responsive to her questions about whether an indictment would be unsealed." Iglesias was fired one week afterward by the Bush administration. Ex-Governor David Cargo (R-NM) accused Wilson of "essentially taking the Fifth [Amendment]" defense thus far.

DOJ also received complaints from "two prominent Republican attorneys, Mickey Barnett and Patrick J. Rogers, [who] met last June with Gonzales's senior counsel, Monica Goodling, to complain that Iglesias was inattentive to voter fraud. Goodling met with them after Kyle Sampson sent her an email saying, "It is sensitive -- perhaps you should do it."

House Judiciary Committee Chairman John Conyers, D-Mich., issued subpoenas on March 1 requiring Iglesias, among other recently ousted U.S. attorneys, to testify before Congress about their firings. Then on March 21, Iglesias wrote an opinion piece that was published in The New York Times. In that article he stated that "it seems clear that politics played a role in the ousters...[M]y name was added to a list of United States attorneys who would be asked to resign — even though I had excellent office evaluations, the biggest political corruption prosecutions in New Mexico history, a record number of overall prosecutions and a 95 percent conviction rate. (In one of the documents released this week, I was deemed a "diverse up and comer" in 2004. Two years later I was asked to resign with no reasons given.)...[the fired U.S. attorneys] had apparently been singled out for political reasons."

In addition, Iglesias responded to critics about his failure to pursue voter fraud cases: "As this story has unfolded these last few weeks, much has been made of my decision to not prosecute alleged voter fraud in New Mexico. Without the benefit of reviewing evidence gleaned from F.B.I. investigative reports, party officials in my state have said that I should have begun a prosecution...After reviewing more than 100 complaints of voter fraud, I felt there was one possible case that should be prosecuted federally. I worked with the F.B.I. and the Justice Department's Public Integrity Section. As much as I wanted to prosecute the case, I could not overcome evidentiary problems. The Justice Department and the F.B.I. did not disagree with my decision in the end not to prosecute."

== Kevin Ryan ==
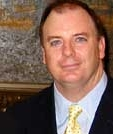
Kevin Ryan

The Los Angeles Times reported on March 22, 2007, that Kevin Ryan was a loyal Bush supporter and that the only reason the DOJ fired him was because his poor performance could cause a public relations problem. The Times reported that Ryan's problems in office were "well documented in legal newspapers" but that "Justice officials wanted to keep Ryan on, even as they plotted the firings of other U.S. attorneys." The article goes on to state that it was only after a judge threatened to report this information to Congress publicly that Ryan was put on the list to be fired.

== John McKay ==
John McKay

Until his dismissal, John McKay received very positive evaluations for his work, including the successful prosecution of terrorist Ahmed Ressam, and the Navy's highest civilian honor for promoting a computer network co-ordinating law enforcement agencies.

In February, the Seattle Times noted that "One of the most persistent rumors in Seattle legal circles is that the Justice Department forced McKay, a Republican, to resign to appease Washington state Republicans angry over the 2004 governor's race. Some believe McKay's dismissal was retribution for his failure to convene a federal grand jury to investigate allegations of voter fraud in the race." On March 17, 2007, the Seattle Times reported, "Former Republican congressman Rick White, one of three candidates the Republicans have submitted to replace John McKay as U.S. attorney for Western Washington, cannot practice law in the state."

In a March 20, 2007 interview, McKay said that "Gonzales the attorney general...He's accountable. The fact that he's presiding over a department that did not defend the independence of its prosecutors is a grievous error." McKay also recalled a call from the chief of staff of Congressman Doc Hastings (R-WA) inquiring into the investigation.

McKay disputed that his firing was based on his support of a proposed information sharing system for federal and state law enforcement, which some DOJ e-mails have suggested. "When they go back and keep shifting stories it tends to indicate there's a more nefarious reason that they're not willing to admit to...That's the real problem, and in my case it may be true because if they put me on that list because I wasn't aggressive enough in ensuring that the Republican candidate for governor was elected, then that's a terrible thing. I still haven't seen clear evidence of that, but the timing is very suspicious." McKay stated.

Prior to his firing McKay had been up for a federal judge position, but had been opposed by all three Republicans on the committee. McKay said that he was told by a source that "the explanation for why I was not one of the three finalists was that I had mishandled the 2004 governor's election." McKay also stated that in his judgeship interview the first question he was asked was about the 2004 race. "I'm in the White House on Aug. 22, I'm on the list [to be fired] on Sept. 13...I might still be United States attorney if I hadn't applied to be a judge."

McKay reported a similar call from Mike Elston, the deputy attorney general's top aide, as Cummings did. McKay stated that after he was fired in December he received a call from a "clearly nervous" Elston. McKay charged that "(Elston) was offering me a deal: you stay silent and the attorney general won't say anything bad about you." Elston responded to this accusation by stating that he "can't imagine" how McKay got that impression and that the call was meant to reassure McKay that the details of his termination would not be discussed.

In a May 5, 2007 article, The Washington Post reported that McKay may have in part been dismissed due to conflicts with his superiors in Washington concerning the investigation of the murder of Assistant United States Attorney Thomas C. Wales. McKay had felt that Washington was neglecting the case. The Post reported McKay's reaction to the news:

The idea that I was pushing too hard to investigate the assassination of a federal prosecutor -- it's mind-numbing" that they would suggest that, McKay said. " . . . If it's true, it's just immoral, and if it's false, then the idea that they would use the death of Tom Wales to cover up what they did is just unconscionable.

== Paul Charlton ==
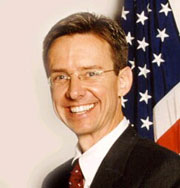
Paul Charlton

Paul Charlton's Arizona office had been honored with the Federal Service Award and hailed by the Justice Department as a "model program" for its protection of crime victims. Charlton ranked in the top third among the nation's 93 U.S. attorneys in contributing to an overall 106,188 federal prosecutions filed in 2006; scored in the top third in number of convictions; oversaw a district in the top five highest in number of immigration-related prosecutions; ranked among the top 20 offices for drug prosecutions; and, unlike in the other seven cases, ranked high in weapons cases, prosecuting 199 of the United States' 9,313 such cases in 2006, the tenth-highest in the country and up fourfold from 2002.

In February 2005, Charlton had been on the "retain" list of Kyle Sampson, Attorney General Alberto Gonzales's chief of staff, but in September 2006 Sampson included the Arizona prosecutor on another list of U.S. attorneys 'we now should consider pushing out.'" Some have insinuated that the change in the status of Charlton might have been related to Charlton's launching an investigation of Rep. Rick Renzi, R-Ariz after his previous "retain" ranking in February 2005, but there is no direct evidence of this relation. Sampson made the comment in a September 13, 2006, letter to then-White House Counsel Harriet Miers. Charlton announced his resignation on December 19, 2006.

On March 19, 2007, the White House released 3,000 pages of records connected to the controversy, including e-mails sent by Charlton to the Justice Department about his dismissal. On December 21, 2006, Charlton sent a message to William W. Mercer, the third-ranking official in the department, writing, "Media now asking if I was asked to resign over leak in Congressman Renzi investigation." Charlton never received a response.

A second motivation for removing Charlton may have been the suggestions of Justice official Brent Ward, who said in a September 20, 2006, e-mail that Charlton was "unwilling to take good cases." Ward's reason for discounting Charlton appeared to be the U.S. attorney's reluctance to pursue obscenity charges against adult video manufacturers in connection to Attorney General Alberto Gonzales's Obscenity Prosecution Task Force.

Charlton had clashed with the Bush administration over the death penalty; in at least two cases he did not seek capital punishment but was overruled from Washington.

After a disagreement over tape-recording interviews and confessions by the FBI on American Indian reservations, which Charlton supported and the Justice Department opposed, Charlton offered to resign. In his congressional testimony on March 6, 2007, Charlton said he found "no small amount of irony" in the fact that he was eventually fired.

== Carol Lam ==
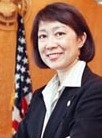
Carol C. Lam

The best known of the dismissed U.S. attorneys was Carol Lam, who had successfully prosecuted then Republican Congressman Duke Cunningham for corruption. On May 11, 2006, the Los Angeles Times reported that her investigation had expanded to investigate Jerry Lewis, then chair of the House Appropriations Committee. On May 10, 2006, Lam had also notified the Justice Department that she intended to execute search warrants on a high-ranking CIA official. On May 11, Kyle Sampson urged the White House counsel's office to call him regarding "the real problem we have right now with Carol Lam." She continued to work as the events unfolded and ordered her staff to finish with the indictments they were working on before her last day in office. In February 2007, two days before her last, her office indicted Dusty Foggo, the former executive director of the Central Intelligence Agency, and a major campaign contributor Brent R. Wilkes (who was previously named on Cunningham's guilty plea).

Kyle Sampson responded to the accusation that his statement that the "real problem" with Lam dealt with the Cunningham investigation. In his testimony before the Congress, Sampson stated that "There was never any connection in my mind between asking Carol Lam to resign and the public corruption case that her office was working on...The real problem ... was her office's prosecution of immigration cases." Sampson went on to say in his testimony that he was not aware of the connection between Lam and the Cunningham investigation. Sampson said, "I don't remember ever hearing about those searches, and I certainly didn't associate in my mind the idea of asking Carol Lam to resign with the fact that her office was doing an investigation of Mr. Foggo and Mr. Wilkes...That office's investigation and prosecution of Duke Cunningham was a good thing."

North County Times has quoted Republican Congressman Darrell Issa stating that he takes "maybe one-twentieth" of the responsibility for Lam's firing. On March 6, 2007, Issa made a statement at the United States House Committee on the Judiciary hearing. Justice Department officials told Senator Charles Schumer that Lam and others were terminated because of "performance-related" issues. However, Deputy Attorney General Paul McNulty later "called [Schumer] on the phone and said, 'I am sorry that I didn't tell you the truth.'"

== Daniel Bogden ==
Daniel Bogden was the United States Attorney for the District of Nevada. Justice officials initially told Congress that his dismissal was "performance reasons." But Deputy Attorney General William Moschella later told a House subcommittee "no particular deficiencies" in Bogden's performance existed. In November 2006, Bogden referred to the FBI allegations that Republican Congressman Jon Porter had committed campaign finance crimes by making fundraising calls from his government offices. It was during Bogden's tenure that the Republican former Congressman (now Nevada Governor) Jim Gibbons was the subject of a federal investigation into suspected bribes by the owner of a defense contractor for which Gibbons had earmarked several millions of dollars.

Emails disclosed to Congress revealed that Deputy Attorney General Paul McNulty told Kyle Sampson, Alberto Gonzales's chief of staff, that he had second thoughts about the firing of Bodgen. Bogden's record showed no obvious problems with performance or differences in policy. McNulty stated in the e-mail on December 5, 2006, that he was "a little skittish about Bogden...He has been with DOJ since 1990 and, at age 50, has never had a job outside of government. My guess is he was hoping to ride this out well into '09 or beyond. I'll admit [I] have not looked at his district's performance."

When Bogden was fired, Senator John Ensign, who had originally nominated him, was decidedly unhappy, particularly after hearing explanations by the Justice Department of the reasons. Ensign commented: "What the Justice Department testified yesterday is inconsistent with what they told me. I can't even tell you how upset I am at the Justice Department." A week later, Ensign said "I'm calling on the President of the United States and the attorney general to restore Dan Bogden's reputation....Everyone in Nevada thought Dan had done a superb job....I believe a very good man was wronged and a process was flawed."

== Margaret Chiara ==
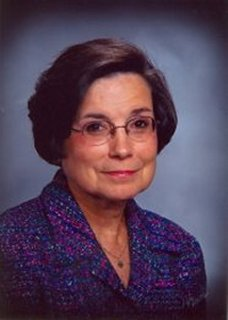
Margaret Chiara

On March 23, 2007, the New York Times reported that Margaret Chiara, the former U.S. Attorney for western Michigan, was told by a senior Justice Department official that she was being removed to make way for a new attorney that the Bush administration wanted to groom. "To say it was about politics may not be pleasant, but at least it is truthful," Chiara said. "Poor performance was not a truthful explanation." AP reported that during her tenure, "the jurisdiction has seen a 15 percent increase in felony prosecutions and convictions. She developed an attorney training and mentoring program that now serves as a national model, her office said."

Chiara wrote in an email recounting her conversation with Elston that he told her that she had "erroneously assumed that good service guaranteed longevity," and noted that she and other prosecutors were "being asked for their resignations without good cause."

== Other U.S. Attorneys dismissed in 2006 ==
=== Todd Graves ===
U.S. Attorney for Western Missouri Todd Graves was listed on the list that the DOJ created in January 2006. He was replaced by Bradley Schlozman, an acting assistant attorney general, who became one of the first to be appointed using the provision enabled by the Patriot Act. Graves resigned in 2006 after refusing to "sign off" on a voter-fraud lawsuit that was filed against the state of Missouri by Schlozman. Schlozman was appointed without Senate confirmation two weeks after Graves' resignation. Schlozman then brought indictments against four voter-registration workers of ACORN, a Democratic-leaning group, several days before the Missouri Senate election date. Schlozman returned to work for the Department of Justice in Washington, D.C., in April 2007 shortly before a federal judge dismissed the voter-fraud lawsuit. More than a year after his resignation, in May 2007, Graves confirmed for the first time that he had been forced out.

=== Bud Cummins ===
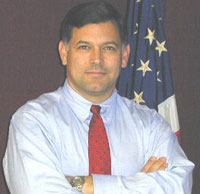
Bud Cummins

Bud Cummins had been investigating allegations that Republican Missouri Governor Matt Blunt had "abused his power by forming a system of umbrella companies established through [the] Kansas City law firm Lathrop & Gage LC to run the state's licensing network," and that he inappropriately rewarded his political supporters with lucrative contracts. Under pressure from the governor's office, in October 2006, Cummins publicly announced that the investigation was over. He was fired in December 2006 and replaced with Timothy Griffin, a controversial former Karl Rove aide.

Cummins told the Senate Judiciary Committee "that Mike Elston, the deputy attorney general's top aide, threatened him with retaliation in a phone call last month if he went public." Emails show that Cummins passed on the warning to some of the other Attorneys who were fired. Elston acknowledges he told Cummins that he said "it's really a shame that all this has to come out in the newspaper," but claimed that this was not intended as a threat.

On March 23, 2007, The Washington Post reported that "New documents also show that Justice and White House officials were preparing for President Bush's approval of the appointment as early as last summer, five months before Griffin took the job." According to that article, the e-mails are "evidence [that] runs contrary to assurances from Attorney General Alberto R. Gonzales that no such move had been planned." On May 30, 2007, Tim Griffin, resigned effective June 1, 2007 after less than six and a half months in office.

== Attorneys fired in 2005 ==
=== Thomas DiBiagio ===
After the revelations of the other firings, Thomas M. DiBiagio, the Maryland U.S. Attorney, stated in March 2007 that he had been ousted in 2005 because of political pressure over public corruption investigations into the administration of then-Gov. Robert L. Ehrlich Jr. (R)

=== Kasey Warner ===
On May 14, 2007, Karl K. "Kasey" Warner, said that he had concerns now that he might have been fired in 2005 for similar reasons to the other US attorneys that were fired. Warner was fired from his position in 2005 as the top as federal prosecutor in southern West Virginia during the middle of a corruption and vote-buying investigation and never told why he was fired. A spokesman for the White House stated that: "The notion that the termination was political is absolutely false...We encourage Mr. Warner to provide the department with a written privacy waiver and we will be happy to provide you with the reason for his removal."
