= Scott Jennings =

American political strategist (born 1977)

- Jennings in 2026
- Born: Jeffrey Scott Jennings; October 26, 1977 (age 49); Princeton, Kentucky, U.S.
- Education: University of Louisville (BA)
- Political party: Republican
- Spouse: Autumn Stiff
- Children: 4
- Website: Official website

Jeffrey Scott Jennings (born October 26, 1977) is an American conservative political strategist, commentator and writer.

During the George W. Bush administration, Jennings was appointed special assistant to the president and deputy director of political affairs in February 2006. He had previously served as a staff member of Bush's presidential campaign in Kentucky in 2000 and executive director of Bush's 2004 re-election campaign in New Mexico in 2004. Jennings is routinely cited as an adviser to Senator Mitch McConnell, and was part of McConnell's campaigns for the U.S. Senate in 2002, 2008, and 2014.

Jennings is a founding partner of RunSwitch Public Relations, Kentucky's largest public relations firm. He has been writing a regular column for the Louisville Courier-Journal since 2013, which is sometimes republished by USA Today. He was signed as an on-air contributor by CNN in 2017, and joined the Los Angeles Times as a columnist in 2019.

== Early life ==
Jeffrey Scott Jennings was born on October 26, 1977, in Princeton, Kentucky. Jennings is a native of Dawson Springs, Kentucky, and attended Dawson Springs High School where he played baseball. Jennings received his bachelor's degree in political science from the University of Louisville in 2000 where he was a McConnell Scholar. While a student at the University of Louisville, Jennings was a news anchor and reporter for WHAS (AM) Radio. While at WHAS, Jennings won an award from the Associated Press Broadcasters Association of Kentucky for a series on the plight of the homeless living in downtown Louisville.

== Career ==
Jennings served as political director for President George W. Bush's 2000 Kentucky campaign, and as campaign manager for Sen. Mitch McConnell's 2002 re-election campaign, Governor Ernie Fletcher's 2003 campaign, and Bush's campaign in New Mexico in 2004, before joining the White House. New Mexico was one of only two states to flip from blue to red in between 2000 and 2004; the other was Iowa. He served as associate director in the Office of Political Affairs at the White House before being named special assistant to the president in October 2005.

After leaving the White House, Jennings became Director of Strategic Development and Senior Strategist for Peritus Public Relations in Louisville, Kentucky, before co-founding RunSwitch PR in Louisville in 2012. During the 2016 presidential election, he appeared frequently on the Fox News Channel and other outlets as a commentator discussing polling and the political news of the day.

In 2017, it was reported in various news outlets that Jennings had been offered, but turned down, a senior role in the Trump White House.

In 2022, Jennings launched the podcast Flyover Country with Scott Jennings, which features commentary on local, state, and national political issues as well as interviews with Mitch McConnell, former Attorney General Daniel Cameron, commentator Erick Erickson, and others.

=== Political operations in Kentucky ===
Between 2000 and 2003, Jennings directed the political operations for Bush's presidential campaign, Senator Mitch McConnell's reelection campaign, and Ernie Fletcher's gubernatorial campaign. Bush defeated Al Gore in Kentucky, a state Bill Clinton won twice, with 56.5%, McConnell set a record by scoring 65 percent in his campaign, and Fletcher became the first Republican governor in Kentucky in over 30 years by winning 55 percent of the vote. Jennings resumed his work in Kentucky in 2008, helping U.S. Senator Mitch McConnell, Congressman Brett Guthrie, and state legislative Republicans win their races.

In 2019, Jennings made television and radio ads for Attorney General Daniel Cameron, the first stand-alone African-American candidate to win statewide office in Kentucky.

=== 2004 Bush campaign in New Mexico ===
After losing New Mexico to Al Gore in 2000 by just 366 votes, President Bush's reelection campaign dispatched Jennings to manage its operations there. Jennings arrived in early 2004 to find a divided state Republican Party. Shortly after his arrival, the state party chairman, State Senator Ramsay Gorham, resigned both her chairmanship and legislative seat and moved out of the state. Jennings and Republican Party counterpart Jay McCleskey set about repairing the damaged party, recruiting 15,000 volunteers to execute a grassroots strategy that relied heavily on peer-to-peer, coalition-based activity. Bush ultimately won the state.

=== GSA Hatch Act inquiry ===
In 2007, Jennings was mentioned in an inquiry into the politicization of the General Services Administration (GSA). At a Congressional hearing, witnesses testified that on January 26, 2007, Jennings was present at a meeting where GSA Administrator Lurita Doan "joined in a video conference earlier this year with top GSA political appointees, who discussed ways to help Republican candidates." On April 23, 2007, the U.S. Office of Special Counsel (OSC) announced it was investigating the January video conference to look at whether the political dealings of the White House had violated the Hatch Act.

While the OSC found that Doan violated the Hatch Act, Elaine Kaplan, Special Counsel during the Clinton Administration, said that "nothing in the OSC's investigative report suggests that anything improper had occurred before Doan initiated the discussion." Jennings' presentation was similar in nature to several others disclosed by the White House. Special Counsel Scott Bloch told the Washington Post, "Political forecasts, just generally ... I do not regard as illegal political activity." White House Deputy Press Secretary Dana Perino described the briefings to reporters: "It's not unlawful and it wasn't unusual for informational briefings to be given. There is no prohibition under the Hatch Act of allowing political appointees to talk to other political appointees about the political landscape in which they are trying to advance the president's agenda."

=== Dismissal of United States Attorneys controversy ===
2006 dismissal of U.S. attorneys controversy
- Timeline
- Summary of attorneys
- Congressional hearings
- List of dismissed attorneys
- All related articles

Jennings was involved in the dismissal of U.S. attorneys controversy in early 2007 testifying on August 2, 2007, before the Senate Judiciary Committee. He invoked executive privilege and refused to answer most questions, claiming the president George W. Bush had ordered his non-compliance. Democrats on the committee contested the legitimacy of the privilege assertion, Patrick Leahy calling it, "...a bogus claim". E-mails published subsequently confirmed that Jennings was directly involved in the controversial firing of New Mexico U.S. Attorney David Iglesias, Jennings writing in one e-mail to a White House staffer, "Iglesias has done nothing", and to another, "We are getting killed out there", adding that the White House "move forward with getting rid of the NM USATTY.".

=== White House and RNC email accounts ===
In the months leading up to the controversy around the dismissal of United States attorneys, Jennings communicated with Justice Department officials "concerning the appointment of Tim Griffin, a former Karl Rove aide, as U.S. attorney in Little Rock, according to e-mails released [in March 2007]. For that exchange, Jennings, although working at the White House, used an e-mail account registered to the Republican National Committee (RNC), where Griffin had worked as a political opposition researcher."

=== Involvement in 2014 U.S. Senate election in Kentucky ===
Jennings ran a Super PAC known as Kentuckians for Strong Leadership that supported the re-election of Mitch McConnell during the 2014 U.S. Senate election in Kentucky. In July 2014, Jennings told radio station WFPL "I think the party is coming together just fine and I don't detect any problems for McConnell on GOP unity."

During the race, Jennings was profiled in New York magazine, which dubbed him "the master of attack". After the race, the Kentucky political news show Pure Politics interviewed Jennings and said that he had "shaped the race in McConnell's favor".

=== Involvement in 2016 Kentucky state legislative races ===
In 2016, Jennings' Super PAC, Kentuckians for Strong Leadership (KSL), sought to help Republicans gain control of the Kentucky House of Representatives. KSL spent $2 million on 19 legislative races as the GOP went from a 53–47 minority to a 64–36 supermajority. Pure Politics credited KSL with helping the GOP achieve its objective. The group created a stir in the closing days of the campaign by sending thousands of Hillary Clinton birthday cards to voters across the state, asking them to "ruin Hillary's birthday" by voting against Clinton and "every Clinton Democrat running".

=== Media ===
==== Columnist for Louisville Courier-Journal and Gannett ====
Jennings became a contributing columnist to the Louisville Courier-Journal in 2013, writing a conservative column that appears every other Wednesday. Jennings' columns are frequently picked up by Gannett's flagship USA Today. In Jennings' columns for the Louisville newspaper, he tackles policy and political issues affecting Kentucky and the nation. In 2018 and 2021, Jennings won a Society of Professional Journalists award for his Courier-Journal writing. Jennings' writing also appears occasionally on RealClearPolitics.

==== CNN ====
In June 2017, Jennings joined CNN as an on-air political contributor. He has made hundreds of appearances on the network on AC360 with Anderson Cooper, The Lead with Jake Tapper, CNN Tonight with Don Lemon, and other programs.

In early June 2025, Jennings called the Free Palestine movement a "domestic terror organization", and referred to the accusations of genocide in Gaza as a "conspiracy theory".

On April 30, 2026, Jennings told fellow panel member Adam Mockler to get his "fucking hand out of [his] face" during a debate on CNN NewsNight after criticism from Mockler. The clip of the exchange soon went viral.

==== Los Angeles Times ====
Jennings was named a Los Angeles Times contributing columnist in the fall of 2019. His initial column for the paper was called "Attitude and Gratitude: Why Republicans Stick with Trump", and was published shortly after Trump had been impeached by the U.S. House of Representatives. Jennings joined the Times' editorial board in November 2024.

=== Harvard Kennedy School ===
Jennings was named a resident fellow at the Harvard Institute of Politics at Harvard Kennedy School for the Spring 2018 semester. He taught a series of seminars on tribalism in American politics, and attracted such guest lecturers to his class as Senate Majority Leader Mitch McConnell and former White House Chief of Staff and RNC Chairman Reince Priebus. In 2019, he was an adjunct lecturer in public policy, teaching a course on modern American political campaigns.

== Personal life ==
Jennings is married to Autumn Stiff Jennings. The couple has four children, and the family lives in Prospect, Kentucky.

== Controversies ==
In August 2026, Jennings accused left-wing political commentator Hasan Piker of having a "plan of returning our country to lynchings" based on comments that Piker had made in 2024. In October 2026, Piker filed a defamation suit against Jennings, arguing the video of Piker which Jennings showed was deceptively edited to give the audience a false impression of Piker's views.
