= 2006 dismissal of U.S. attorneys =

George W. Bush administration controversy

On December 7, 2006, the George W. Bush administration's Department of Justice ordered the midterm dismissal of seven United States attorneys. Congressional investigations focused on whether the Department of Justice and the White House were using the U.S. attorney positions for political advantage. The allegations were that some of the attorneys were targeted for dismissal for failing to prosecute claims of election fraud, as retribution for prosecuting Republican politicians, or for failing to pursue adult obscenity prosecutions. The U.S. attorneys were replaced with interim appointees under provisions in the 2005 USA PATRIOT Act reauthorization.

A subsequent report by the Justice Department inspector general in October 2008 found that the process used to fire the first seven attorneys and two others dismissed around the same time was "arbitrary", "fundamentally flawed", and "raised doubts about the integrity of Department prosecution decisions". In July 2010, the Department of Justice prosecutors closed the two-year investigation without filing charges after determining the firing was inappropriately political but not criminal, observing that "evidence did not demonstrate that any prosecutable criminal offense was committed with regard to the removal of David Iglesias. The investigative team also determined that the evidence did not warrant expanding the scope of the investigation beyond the removal of Iglesias."

== Issues in brief ==
By tradition, all U.S. attorneys are asked to resign at the start of a new administration. The new president may elect to keep or remove any U.S. attorney. They are traditionally replaced, collectively, only at the start of a new White House administration. U.S. attorneys hold a political office, in which the president nominates candidates to office, the Senate confirms and, consequently, they serve at the pleasure of the president. When a new president is from a different political party, typically almost all of the resignations are eventually accepted and the positions are then filled by newly confirmed appointees, typically from the new president's party. While U.S. attorneys are political appointees, however, it is essential to their effectiveness that they are politically impartial in deciding which cases to prosecute and in arguing those cases before judges and juries with diverse views.

Some U.S. senators were concerned about a provision in the 2006 re-authorization of the USA PATRIOT Act that eliminated the 120-day term limit on interim appointments of U.S. attorneys made by the United States attorney general to fill vacancies. The revised USA PATRIOT Act permitted the attorney general to appoint interim U.S. attorneys without a term limit in office, and avoid a confirming vote by the Senate. The change in the law undermined the confirmation authority of the Senate and gave the attorney general greater appointment powers than the president, since the president's U.S. attorney appointees are required to be confirmed by the Senate and those of the attorney general did not require confirmation.

The Senate was concerned that in dismissing the seven U.S. attorneys which had been confirmed, the administration planned to fill the vacancies with its own choices, bypassing Senate confirmation and the traditional consultation with senators in the selection process. Congress rescinded this provision on June 14, 2007, and President Bush promptly signed the bill into law.

=== Administration rationale unclear ===
The reasons for the dismissal of each individual U.S. attorney were unclear. Two suggested motivations were that the administration wanted to make room for U.S. attorneys who would be more sympathetic to the administration's political agenda, and the administration wanted to advance the careers of promising conservatives. Critics said that the attorneys were fired for failing to prosecute Democratic politicians, for failing to prosecute claims of election fraud, as retribution for prosecuting Republican politicians, or for failing to pursue adult obscenity prosecutions. The administration and its supporters said that the attorneys were dismissed for job-performance reasons "related to policy, priorities and management", and that U.S. attorneys serve at the pleasure of the president. However, at least six attorneys had recently received positive evaluations of their performance from the Department of Justice. In September 2008, the Department of Justice inspector general's investigation concluded that the dismissals were politically motivated and improper.

The Bush administration issued changing and contradictory statements about the timeline of the planning of the firings, persons who ordered the firings, and reasons for the firings. The origin and evolution of the list of attorneys to be dismissed remained unclear. In response to the Inspector General's report, in September 2008, Attorney General Michael Mukasey appointed acting United States attorney for the District of Connecticut, Nora Dannehy, as special prosecutor to determine if administration officials had perjured themselves in testimony to Congress. Her investigation concluded that there was insufficient evidence to charge anyone with perjury.

=== Politicization of hiring at the Department of Justice ===
Attorney General Gonzales, in a confidential memorandum dated March 1, 2006, delegated authority to senior DOJ staff Monica Goodling and Kyle Sampson to hire and dismiss political appointees and some civil service positions.

On May 2, 2007, the Department of Justice announced two separate investigations into hirings conducted by Goodling: one by the department's inspector general, and a second by the Office of Professional Responsibility. In testimony before the House Judiciary Committee, on May 23, 2007, Goodling stated that she had "crossed the line" and broken civil service laws regulating hiring for civil service positions, and had improperly weighed political factors in assessing applicants.

According to a January 2009 Justice Department report, investigators found that Bradley Schlozman, as interim head of the Civil Rights Division at the Department of Justice, "favored applicants with conservative political or ideological affiliations and disfavored applicants with civil rights or human rights experience whom he considered to be overly liberal". The positions under consideration were not political, but career, for which the political and ideological views of candidates are not to be considered, according to federal law and guidelines.

In a letter of May 30, 2007, to the Senate Judiciary Committee, the United States Department of Justice Office of the Inspector General and Counsel for the Office of Professional Responsibility confirmed that they were expanding their investigation beyond "the removals of United States Attorneys" to include "DOJ hiring and personnel decisions" by Goodling and other Justice Department employees.

=== Dismissed attorneys and elections ===
The controversy surrounding the U.S. attorneys dismissals was often linked to elections or voter-fraud issues. Allegations were that some of the U.S. attorneys were dismissed for failing to instigate investigations damaging to Democratic politicians, or for failing to more aggressively pursue voter-fraud cases. Such allegations were made by some of the dismissed U.S. attorneys themselves to suggest reasons they may have been dismissed. The background to the allegations is the recent tendency for elections in parts of the United States to be very close; an election outcome can be affected by an announced investigation of a politician. It is explicit policy of the Department of Justice to avoid bringing voter-related cases during an election for this reason. In September 2008, the inspector general for the Department of Justice concluded that some of the dismissals were motivated by the refusal of some of the U.S. attorneys to prosecute voter fraud cases during the 2006 election cycle.

== Fallout ==
By mid-September 2007, nine senior staff of the Department of Justice associated with the controversy had resigned. The most prominent resignations include:

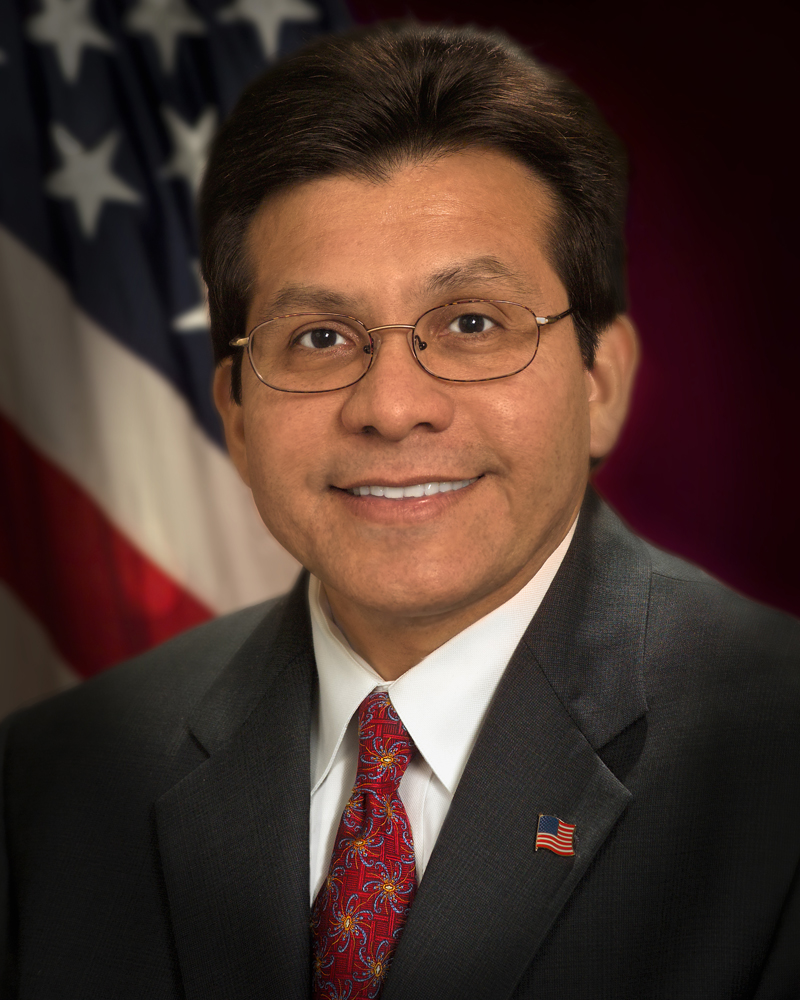
Alberto Gonzales

- Attorney General Alberto Gonzales
- Deputy Attorney General Paul McNulty;
- Acting Associate Attorney General William W. Mercer resigned from the acting office prior to Senate confirmation hearings for the same position, and returned to his post as U.S. Attorney for Montana (he held dual positions);
- Chief of staff for the Attorney General Kyle Sampson
- Chief of Staff for the Deputy Attorney General Michael Elston;
- Director of the Executive Office for United States Attorneys (EOUSA) Michael A. Battle;
- the subsequently appointed Director to the EOUSA, Bradley Schlozman, also the former acting Assistant Attorney General for the Civil Rights Division;
- the Department of Justice's White House Liaison Monica Goodling

In June 2008, a grand jury was empaneled to consider criminal indictments against officials involved in the firings. The grand jury was presented evidence from ongoing investigations at the Department of Justice inspector general's office and at the DOJ's Office of Professional Responsibility.

=== Inspector General Report and special prosecutor ===
On September 29, 2008 the Justice Department's Inspector General (IG) released a report on the matter that found most of the firings were politically motivated and improper. The next day Attorney General Michael Mukasey appointed Nora Dannehy as special prosecutor to decide whether criminal charges should be brought against Gonzales and other officials involved in the firings. The IG's report contained "substantial evidence" that party politics drove a number of the firings, and IG Glenn Fine said in a statement that Gonzales had "abdicated his responsibility to safeguard the integrity and independence of the department." The report itself stopped short of resolving questions about higher White House involvement in the matter, because of what it said were the refusal to cooperate of a number of key players, among them Karl Rove, Senator Pete Domenici and Harriet Miers and because the White House refused to hand over its documents related to the firings.

On July 21, 2010, Dannehy concluded that "there was insufficient evidence to establish that persons knowingly made material false statements to [the Office of Inspector General] or Congress or corruptly endeavored to obstruct justice" and that no criminal charges would be filed against Sampson or Gonzales.

== Replacement of the U.S. attorneys ==
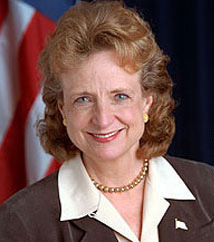
Harriet Miers

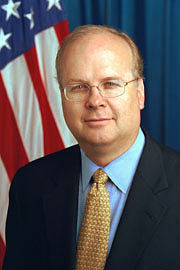
Karl Rove

=== Initial planning ===
On January 6, 2005, Colin Newman, an assistant in the White House counsels office, wrote to David Leitch stating, "Karl Rove stopped by to ask you (roughly quoting) 'how we planned to proceed regarding U.S. attorneys, whether we were going to allow all to stay, request resignations from all and accept only some of them or selectively replace them, etc.'". The email was then forwarded to Kyle Sampson, chief of staff to Attorney General Alberto Gonzales.

In reply, Sampson, then Department of Justice counsel to Attorney General John Ashcroft, wrote that it would be "weird to ask them to leave before completing at least a 4-year term", that they "would like to replace 15–20 percent of the current U.S. Attorneys" and that the rest "are doing a great job, are loyal Bushies, etc."

In March 2005, Sampson

came up with a checklist. He rated each of the U.S. Attorneys with criteria that appeared to value political allegiance as much as job performance. He recommended retaining 'strong U.S. Attorneys who have ... exhibited loyalty to the President and Attorney General.' He suggested 'removing weak U.S. Attorneys who have ... chafed against Administration initiatives'.

Sampson wrote in January 2006 to Miers that he recommended that the Department of Justice and the Office of the Counsel to the President work together to seek the replacement of a limited number of U.S. attorneys, and that by limiting the number of attorneys "targeted for removal and replacement" it would "mitigat[e] the shock to the system that would result from an across-the-board firing".

On February 12, 2006, Monica Goodling sent a spreadsheet of each U.S. attorney's political activities and memberships in conservative political groups to senior Administration officials, with the comment "This is the chart that the AG requested".

Sampson strongly urged using changes to the law governing U.S. attorney appointments to bypass Congressional confirmation, writing in a September 17, 2006 memo to Miers:

I am only in favor of executing on a plan to push some USAs out if we really are ready and willing to put in the time necessary to select candidates and get them appointed ... It will be counterproductive to DOJ operations if we push USAs out and then don't have replacements ready to roll immediately ... I strongly recommend that as a matter of administration, we utilize the new statutory provisions that authorize the AG to make USA appointments ... [By avoiding Senate confirmation] we can give far less deference to home state senators and thereby get 1.) our preferred person appointed and 2.) do it far faster and more efficiently at less political costs to the White House.

=== Implementation: the U.S. attorney removal list ===
In October 2006, President George W. Bush told Alberto Gonzales that he had received complaints that some U.S. attorneys had not pursued certain voter-fraud investigations. The complaints came from Republican officials, who demanded fraud investigations into a number of Democratic campaigns.

According to Newsweek, "Kyle Sampson, Gonzales's chief of staff, developed the list of eight prosecutors to be fired last October—with input from the White House".

On November 27, 2006, Gonzales met with senior advisers to discuss the plan. The Justice Department did not receive White House approval for the firings until early December. As late as December 2, Sampson had written to Michael Elston that the Justice Department was "[s]till waiting for green light from White House" with regards to the firing. Deputy White House counsel William K. Kelley responded on December 4, 2006, saying, "We're a go for the U.S. Atty plan ... [the White House office of legislative affairs], political, communications have signed off and acknowledged that we have to be committed to following through once the pressure comes."

On December 7, 2006, Justice Department official Michael A. Battle informed seven U.S. attorneys that they were being dismissed.

Although seven attorneys were dismissed on December 7, 2006, subsequent disclosures show that three or more additional attorneys were dismissed under similar circumstances between 2005 and 2006. U.S. attorney Bud Cummins in Arkansas had been informed in June 2006 that he was to be replaced, and he resigned, effective December 20, 2006, several days after the public announcement of the appointment of his successor Timothy Griffin.

Dismissed U.S. attorneys summary
Dismissed attorney		Effective date of resignation	Federal district	Replacement^{1}
Dismissed December 7, 2006
1.	David Iglesias	Dec 19, 2006	New Mexico	Larry Gomez
2.	Kevin V. Ryan	Jan 16, 2007	Northern California	Scott Schools
3.	John McKay	Jan 26, 2007	Western Washington	Jeffrey C. Sullivan
4.	Paul K. Charlton	Jan 31, 2007	Arizona	Daniel G. Knauss
5.	Carol Lam	Feb 15, 2007	Southern California	Karen Hewitt
6.	Daniel Bogden	Feb 28, 2007	Nevada	Steven Myhre
7.	Margaret Chiara	Mar 16, 2007	Western Michigan	Russell C. Stoddard
Others dismissed in 2006
1.	Todd Graves	Mar 24, 2006^{2}	Western Missouri	Bradley Schlozman^{6}
2.	Bud Cummins	Dec 20, 2006^{3}	Eastern Arkansas	Tim Griffin^{5}
Dismissed in 2005
1.	Thomas M. DiBiagio	Jan 2, 2005^{4}	Maryland	Allen F. Loucks
2.	Kasey Warner	Jul 2005^{4}	Southern W. Virginia	Charles T. Miller
^{1}Source: Department of Justice, U.S. Attorneys Offices^{2}Informed of dismissal January 2006.^{3}Informed of dismissal June 2006.^{4}Date resignation requested by the Department of Justice is unknown.^{5}Subsequently submitted resignation on May 30, 2007, effective June 1, 2007.^{6}Subsequently returned to positions at the Department of Justice in Washington

David Iglesias (R) believes he was removed from office at the behest of two New Mexico Republican congressmen when he refused to prosecute state Democratic senators before the November 2006 election.

Kevin Ryan (R) Though described as "loyal to the Bush administration," he was allegedly fired for the possible controversy that negative job performance evaluations might cause if they were released.

John McKay (R) Was given a positive job evaluation 7 months before he was fired. After a close Washington governor's race resulted in a Democratic victory, local Republicans criticized McKay for not investigating allegations of voter fraud.

Paul K. Charlton (R) U.S. attorney for Arizona, was given a positive job performance evaluation before he was dismissed. He may have been fired because he had started a corruption investigation into Representative Rick Renzi (R-AZ). In September 2006, it became clear that Charlton had launched an investigation of Renzi over a land-swap deal. Sampson subsequently included Charlton on a list of U.S. attorneys "we now should consider pushing out." Sampson made the comment in a Sept. 13, 2006, letter to then-White House Counsel Harriet Miers.

Carol Lam (R) U.S. attorney for California, oversaw the investigation and conviction of Rep. Randy "Duke" Cunningham (R-CA) for corruption in military contracting. Congressman Darrell Issa complained that Lam was not prosecuting illegal border crossings aggressively enough. On December 7, 2006, Michael A. Battle, Director of the Executive Office for US Attorneys, called Lam and notified her that she must resign no later than January 31, 2007. Battle instructed Lam to explain that she had decided to pursue other opportunities. Battle insisted that Lam had to depart in weeks, not months, and these orders were "coming from the very highest levels of government". Lam submitted her resignation January 16, 2007, effective February 15.

Daniel Bogden (R) U.S. attorney for Nevada was investigating Nevada governor Jim Gibbons (R) for bribery, when he was fired without explanation after seven years because of a vague sense that a "stronger leader" was needed. His loyalty to President Bush was questioned by Sampson.

Margaret Chiara (R) U.S. attorney for Michigan was given a positive job evaluation in 2005, and told she was being removed to "make way" for another individual. On March 23, 2007, The New York Times reported that Chiara was told by a senior Justice Department official that she was being removed to make way for a new attorney that the Bush administration wanted to groom. "To say it was about politics may not be pleasant, but at least it is truthful," Chiara said. "Poor performance was not a truthful explanation."

Todd Graves (R) had been pressed to bring a civil suit against Missouri secretary of state Robin Carnahan (D) for allegedly failing to crack down on voting fraud. In January 2006, Graves was asked to step down from his job by Michael A. Battle, then director of the Justice Department's Executive Office for U.S. Attorneys. Graves had clashed with the Department of Justice's civil rights division over a federal lawsuit involving Missouri's voter rolls. The department was pushing for a lawsuit against Missouri, accusing the state of failing to eliminate ineligible people from voter rolls. Graves refused to sign off on the lawsuit, which was subsequently authorized by Graves' successor, Bradley Schlozman (R). Citizens for Responsibility and Ethics in Washington filed a complaint against Bond over his role in ousting Graves.

Bud Cummins (R) allegedly was asked to leave so Timothy Griffin, an aide to Karl Rove, could have his job. Deputy Attorney General Paul McNulty testified that Cummins was removed for no reason except to install a former aide to Karl Rove: 37-year-old Tim Griffin, a former opposition research director for the Republican National Committee. Cummins told the Senate Judiciary Committee "that Mike Elston, the deputy attorney general's top aide, threatened him with retaliation in a phone call [in February 2007] if he went public." Emails show that Cummins passed on the warning to some of the other attorneys who were fired.

David Iglesias (R) U.S. attorney for New Mexico. In 2005 Allen Weh, Chairman of the New Mexico Republican Party, complained about Iglesias to a White House aide for Karl Rove, asking that Iglesias be removed. Weh was dissatisfied with Iglesias due in part to his failure to indict New Mexico state senator Manny Aragon (D) on fraud and conspiracy charges. Then in 2006 Rove personally told Weh "He's gone."

Thomas M. DiBiagio (R) U.S. attorney for Maryland, stated in March 2007 that he was ousted because of political pressure over public corruption investigations into the administration of then-Gov. Robert L. Ehrlich Jr.

=== Administration testimony contradicted by documents ===
Members of Congress investigating the dismissals found that sworn testimony from Department of Justice officials appeared to be contradicted by internal Department memoranda and e-mail, and that possibly Congress was deliberately misled. The White House role in the dismissals remained unclear despite hours of testimony by Attorney General Gonzales and senior Department of Justice staff in congressional committee hearings.

== Reactions and congressional investigation ==
=== Initial reaction ===
The initial reaction was from the senators of the affected states. In a letter to Gonzales on January 9, 2007, senators Feinstein (D, California) and Leahy (D, Vermont; Chair of the Committee) of the Senate Judiciary Committee expressed concern that the confirmation process for U.S. attorneys would be bypassed, and on January 11, they, together with Senator Pryor (D, Arkansas), introduced legislation "to prevent circumvention of the Senate's constitutional prerogative to confirm U.S. Attorneys", called Preserving United States Attorney Independence Act of 2007, S. 214 and H.R. 580. The initial concern was about the USA PATRIOT Act and the confirmation process, rather than the politicization of the U.S. attorneys.

Gonzales testified before the Senate Judiciary Committee on January 18. He assured the committee that he did not intend to bypass the confirmation process and denied the firings were politically motivated.

The concerns expressed by senators Feinstein and Pryor were followed up by hearings before the Senate Judiciary Committee called by Senator Schumer (D, New York) in February. Deputy Attorney General Paul McNulty testified before the Senate Judiciary Committee on February 6. He said that the seven were fired for job performance issues and not political considerations; these statements led several of the dismissed attorneys, who had been previously silent, to come forward with questions about their dismissals, partially because their performance reviews prior to their dismissal had been highly favorable.

In subsequent closed-door testimony on April 27, 2007, to the committee, McNulty said that days after the February hearing, he learned that White House officials had not revealed to him White House influence and discussions on creating the list. McNulty in February called Senator Schumer by telephone to apologize for the inaccurate characterization of the firings. McNulty testified that Bud Cummins, the U.S. attorney for Arkansas, was removed to install a former aide to Karl Rove and Republican National Committee opposition research director, Timothy Griffin. Cummins, apparently, "was ousted after Harriet E. Miers, the former White House counsel, intervened on behalf of Griffin".

McNulty's testimony that the attorneys were fired for "performance related issues" caused the attorneys to come forward in protest. There is some evidence that the administration was concerned about the attorneys' going public with complaints prior to this time.

Salon.com reported: "[A]t least three of the eight fired attorneys were told by a superior they were being forced to resign to make jobs available for other Bush appointees, according to a former senior Justice Department official knowledgeable about their cases."

=== Further investigation and resignations ===
==== Battle resignation ====
On March 5, 2007 effective March 16, Michael A. Battle resigned his position of Director of the Executive Office for United States Attorneys (EOUSA). On March 6, 2007, Gonzales responded to the controversy in an op-ed in USA Today in which he wrote:

To be clear, [the firing] was for reasons related to policy, priorities and management — what have been referred to broadly as "performance-related" reasons — that seven U.S. attorneys were asked to resign last December ... We have never asked a U.S. attorney to resign in an effort to retaliate against him or her or to inappropriately interfere with a public corruption case (or any other type of case, for that matter). Like me, U.S. attorneys are political appointees, and we all serve at the pleasure of the president. If U.S. attorneys are not executing their responsibilities in a manner that furthers the management and policy goals of departmental leadership, it is appropriate that they be replaced ... While I am grateful for the public service of these seven U.S. attorneys, they simply lost my confidence. I hope that this episode ultimately will be recognized for what it is: an overblown personnel matter.

==== Sampson resignation ====
On March 12, 2007, Sampson resigned from the Department of Justice.

On March 13, Gonzales stated in a news conference that he accepted responsibility for mistakes made in the dismissal and rejected calls for his resignation that Democratic members of Congress had been making. He also stood by his decision to dismiss the attorneys, saying "I stand by the decision and I think it was the right decision". Gonzales admitted that "incomplete information was communicated or may have been communicated to Congress" by Justice Department officials, and said that "I never saw documents. We never had a discussion about where things stood."

Gonzales lost more support when records subsequently challenged some of these statements. Although the Department of Justice released 3,000 pages of its internal communications related to this issue, none of those documents discussed anything related to a performance review process for these attorneys before they were fired. Records released on March 23 showed that on his November 27 schedule "he attended an hour-long meeting at which, aides said, he approved a detailed plan for executing the purge".

==== Executive Privilege claims ====
Senate Judiciary Committee chairman Patrick Leahy stated that Congress has the authority to subpoena Justice Department and White House officials including chief political advisor to the president Karl Rove and former White House counsel Harriet Miers. On March 20, President Bush declared in a press conference that his aides would not testify under oath on the matter if subpoenaed by Congress. Bush explained his position saying,

The President relies upon his staff to provide him candid advice. The framers of the Constitution understood this vital role when developing the separate branches of government. And if the staff of a President operated in constant fear of being hauled before various committees to discuss internal deliberations, the President would not receive candid advice, and the American people would be ill-served ... I will oppose any attempts to subpoena White House officials ... My choice is to make sure that I safeguard the ability for Presidents to get good decisions.

Despite the president's position against aides testifying, on March 21 the House Judiciary Committee authorized the subpoena of five Justice Department officials, and on March 22, the Senate Judiciary Committee authorized subpoenas as well.

==== Goodling resignation ====
Sampson's replacement as the attorney general's temporary chief of staff was the U.S. attorney for the Eastern District of Virginia, Chuck Rosenberg. Rosenberg initiated a DOJ inquiry into possibly inappropriate political considerations in Monica Goodling's hiring practices for civil service staff. Civil service positions are not political appointments and must be made on a nonpartisan basis. In one example, Jeffrey A. Taylor, former interim U.S. attorney for the District of Columbia, tried to hire a new career prosecutor, Seth Adam Meinero, in the fall of 2006. Goodling judged Meinero too "liberal" and declined to approve the hire. Meinero, a Howard University law school graduate who had worked on civil rights cases at the Environmental Protection Agency, was serving as a special assistant prosecutor in Taylor's office. Taylor went around Goodling, and demanded Sampson's approval to make the hire. In another example, Goodling removed an attorney from her job at the Department of Justice because she was rumored to be a lesbian, and, further, blocked the attorney from getting other Justice Department jobs she was qualified for. Rules concerning hiring at the Justice Department forbid discrimination based on sexual orientation.

On March 26, 2007, Goodling, who had helped coordinate the dismissal of the attorneys with the White House, took leave from her job as counsel to the attorney general and as the Justice Department's liaison to the White House. Goodling was set to testify before Congress, but on March 26, 2007, she cancelled her appearance at the congressional hearing, citing her Fifth Amendment right against self-incrimination. On April 6, 2007, Goodling resigned from the Department of Justice.

On April 25, 2007, the House Judiciary Committee passed a resolution, by a 32–6 vote, authorizing lawyers for the House to apply for a court order granting Goodling immunity in exchange for her testimony and authorizing a subpoena for her. On May 11, 2007, U.S. District Court chief judge Thomas Hogan signed an order granting Goodling immunity in exchange for her truthful testimony in the U.S. attorney firings investigation, stating that "Goodling may not refuse to testify, and may not refuse to provide other information, when compelled to do so" before the committee.

Goodling appeared before the House Judiciary Committee, on May 23, 2007, under a limited immunity agreement, and provided to the committee a written statement that she read at the start of her testimony.

In response to questions during the hearing, Goodling stated that she "crossed the line" and broke civil service rules about hiring, and improperly weighed political factors in considering applicants for career positions at the Department of Justice.

==== Gonzales resignation ====
A number of members of both houses of Congress publicly said Gonzales should resign, or be fired by Bush. On March 14, 2007, Senator John E. Sununu (R, New Hampshire) became the first Republican lawmaker to call for Gonzales' resignation. Sununu cited not only the controversial firings but growing concern over the use of the USA PATRIOT Act and misuse of national security letters by the Federal Bureau of Investigation. Calls for his ousting intensified after his testimony on April 19, 2007. By May 16, at least twenty-two senators and seven members of the House of Representatives—including senators Hillary Clinton (D, New York) and Mark Pryor (D, Arkansas)—had called for Gonzales' resignation.

Gonzales submitted his resignation as Attorney General effective September 17, 2007, by a letter addressed to President Bush on August 26, 2007. In a statement on August 27, Gonzales thanked the President for the opportunity to be of service to his country, giving no indication of either the reasons for his resignation or his future plans. Later that day, President Bush praised Gonzales for his service, reciting the numerous positions in Texas government, and later, the government of the United States, to which Bush had appointed Gonzales.

On September 17, 2007, President Bush announced the nomination of ex-judge Michael Mukasey to serve as Gonzales' successor.

==== Testimony of Sara Taylor: Claims of executive privilege ====
On July 11, 2007, Sara Taylor, former top aide to Karl Rove, testified before the Senate Judiciary Committee. Throughout Taylor's testimony, she refused to answer many questions, saying "I have a very clear letter from [White House counsel] Mr. [Fred] Fielding. That letter says and has asked me to follow the president's assertion of executive privilege." Chairman Patrick Leahy (D-VT) dismissed the claims and warned Taylor she was "in danger of drawing a criminal contempt of Congress citation". Senator Ben Cardin (D-MD) took issue with the claim as well, telling Taylor "You seem to be selective in the use of the presidential privilege. It seems like you're saying that, 'Yes, I'm giving you all the information I can,' when it's self-serving to the White House, but not allowing us to have the information to make independent judgment." Leahy added "I do note your answer that you did not discuss these matters with the president and, to the best of your knowledge, he was not involved is going to make some nervous at the White House because it seriously undercuts his claim of executive privilege if he was not involved." He also said "It's apparent that this White House is contemptuous of the Congress and feels it does not have to explain itself to anyone, not to the people's representatives in Congress nor to the American people."

In summary, Taylor told the Senate that she

"did not talk to or meet with President Bush about removing federal prosecutors before eight of them were fired", she had no knowledge on whether Bush was involved in any way in the firings, her resignation had nothing to do with the controversy, "she did not recall ordering the addition or deletion of names to the list of prosecutors to be fired", and she refuted the testimony of Kyle Sampson, Attorney General Alberto Gonzales' chief of staff, that she sought "to avoid submitting a new prosecutor, Tim Griffin, through Senate confirmation."

=== Contempt of Congress charges ===
On July 11, 2007, as Sara Taylor testified, George Manning, the attorney to former White House counsel Harriet Miers, announced that Miers intended to follow the request of the Bush Administration and not appear before the Committee the following day. Manning stated Miers "cannot provide the documents and testimony that the committee seeks."

On July 17, 2007, Sanchez and Conyers notified White House counsel Fred Fielding that they were considering the executive privilege claims concerning a "subpoena issued on June 13 to Joshua Bolten, White House chief of staff, to produce documents." They warned, "If those objections are overruled, you should be aware that the refusal to produce the documents called for in the subpoena could subject Mr. Bolten to contempt proceedings". The panel ruled the claims of privilege as invalid on a party-line vote of 7–3.

On July 25, 2007 the United States House Committee on the Judiciary voted along party lines 22–17 to issue citations of contempt of Congress to White House chief of staff Joshua Bolten and former White House counsel Harriet Miers. Committee Republicans voted against the measure, calling it "a partisan waste of time", while Democrats said "this is the moment for Congress to rein in the administration."

On February 14, 2008, the United States House of Representatives voted 223–32 along party lines to pass the contempt resolutions against White House chief of staff Bolten and former White House counsel Miers. Most Republicans staged a walkout during the vote.

== Aftermath ==
=== Subpoenas and lost emails ===
White House spokesman Scott Stanzel stated that some of the emails that had involved official correspondence relating to the firing of attorneys may have been lost because they were conducted on Republican party accounts and not stored properly. "Some official e-mails have potentially been lost and that is a mistake the White House is aggressively working to correct." said Stanzel, a White House spokesman. Stonzel said that they could not rule out the possibility that some of the lost emails dealt with the firing of U.S. attorneys. For example, J. Scott Jennings, an aide to Karl Rove communicated with Justice Department officials "concerning the appointment of Tim Griffin, a former Rove aide, as U.S. attorney in Little Rock, according to e-mails released in March, 2007. For that exchange, Jennings, although working at the White House, used an e-mail account registered to the Republican National Committee, where Griffin had worked as a political opposition researcher."

CNN reported a larger question concerning the lost e-mails: "Whether White House officials such as political adviser Karl Rove are intentionally conducting sensitive official presidential business via non-governmental accounts to evade a law requiring preservation—and eventual disclosure—of presidential records."

On May 2, 2007, the Senate Judiciary Committee issued a subpoena to Attorney General Gonzales compelling the Department of Justice to produce all email from Karl Rove regarding evaluation and dismissal of attorneys that was sent to DOJ staffers, no matter what email account Rove may have used, whether White House, National Republican party, or other accounts, with a deadline of May 15, 2007, for compliance. The subpoena also demanded relevant email previously produced in the Valerie Plame controversy and investigation for the 2003 CIA leak scandal.

In August 2007, Karl Rove resigned without responding to the Senate Judiciary Committee subpoena claiming, "I just think it's time to leave."

=== Appointment of U.S. attorneys and the 2005 Patriot Act reauthorization ===
The president of the United States has the authority to appoint U.S. attorneys, with the consent of the United States Senate, and the president may remove U.S. attorneys from office. In the event of a vacancy, the United States attorney general is authorized to appoint an interim U.S. attorney. Before March 9, 2006, such interim appointments expired after 120 days, if a presidential appointment had not been approved by the Senate. Vacancies that persisted beyond 120 days were filled through interim appointments made by the Federal District Court for the district of the vacant office.

The USA PATRIOT Act Improvement and Reauthorization Act of 2005, signed into law March 9, 2006, amended the law for the interim appointment of U.S. attorneys by deleting two provisions: (a) the 120-day maximum term for the attorney general's interim appointees, and (b) the subsequent interim appointment authority of Federal District Courts. With the revision, an interim appointee can potentially serve indefinitely (though still removable by the president), if the president declines to nominate a U.S. attorney for a vacancy, or the Senate either fails to act on a presidential nomination, or rejects a nominee that is different than the interim appointee.

On June 14, 2007, President Bush signed a bill into law that re-instated the 120-day term limit on interim attorneys appointed by the attorney general.

== See also ==
- List of federal political scandals in the United States
- Don Siegelman
- Cyril Wecht
- Association of Community Organizations for Reform Now (ACORN)
- Rachel Paulose
