= Diane Humetewa =

American judge (born 1964)

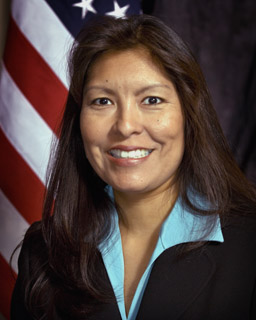

Judge of the United States District Court for the District of Arizona
- Incumbent
- Assumed office May 16, 2014
- Appointed by: Barack Obama
- Preceded by: Mary H. Murguia

United States Attorney for the District of Arizona
- In office December 17, 2007 – August 2, 2009
- President: George W. Bush; Barack Obama
- Preceded by: Paul K. Charlton
- Succeeded by: Dennis K. Burke

Personal details
- Born: Diane Joyce Humetewa; 1964 (age 61–62) Phoenix, Arizona, U.S.
- Party: Republican
- Education: Phoenix College (AA); Arizona State University (BS, JD)

Diane Joyce Humetewa (/ˌhuːməˈteɪwə/ HOO-mə-TAY-wə; born 1964) is a United States district judge of the United States District Court for the District of Arizona. Humetewa is the first Native American woman and the first enrolled tribal member to serve as a U.S. federal judge. She previously served as the United States Attorney for the District of Arizona from 2007 to 2009. Humetewa is also a Professor of Practice at Arizona State University's Sandra Day O'Connor College of Law.

Humetewa has served as counsel to the Senate Committee on Indian Affairs and to the Deputy Attorney General for the United States Department of Justice, as a member of the United States Sentencing Guideline Commission, Native American Advisory Committee, and as an Appellate Court Judge for the Hopi Tribe, of which she is an enrolled member.

== Early life, education, and legal career ==
Humetewa was born in 1964 in Phoenix, Arizona. She is Native American and is an enrolled member of the Hopi tribe. She earned an associate degree from Phoenix College in 1985, then graduated from Arizona State University in 1987 with a Bachelor of Science. From 1987 to 1990, Humetewa worked as a victim advocate for the U.S. Attorney's Office for the Arizona federal judicial district. She then attended Arizona State's Sandra Day O'Connor College of Law, graduating in 1993 with a Juris Doctor.

From 1993 to 1996, Humetewa was a deputy counsel for the U.S. Senate's Committee on Indian Affairs. Beginning in 1996, she served as the Tribal Liaison in the office of the United States Attorney for Arizona. From 2001 to 2007, she served there as Senior Litigation Counsel. In January 2007 Humetewa was recommended as a United States attorney by a United States Attorney.

Humetewa was the permanent successor to Paul K. Charlton, whose dismissal on December 7, 2006, was a prominent aspect of the dismissal of U.S. attorneys controversy in the Bush administration in early 2007. Daniel G. Knauss served as interim United States Attorney for one year after Charlton's dismissal. During that period, Knauss and Humetewa continued to pursue the criminal investigation of Congressman Rick Renzi (R-AZ), begun by Charlton in September 2006. Renzi was indicted by the United States Attorney's office on February 22, 2008.

A graduate of the Indian Legal Program at the ASU college of law, Humetewa is considered a national expert on Native American legal issues; she has instructed law enforcement and prosecutors on this topic. From 2002 to 2007, she served as a judge pro tem on the Hopi Tribal Appellate Court, and as an ad hoc member of the Native American Subcommittee of the United States Sentencing Commission. Humetewa resigned effective August 2, 2009, when President Barack Obama nominated Dennis K. Burke as the next United States attorney for the District of Arizona. She was appointed in 2011 as ASU's Special Advisor to the university president for American Indian Affairs and Special Counsel in the Office of General Counsel at ASU.

=== Federal judicial service ===
On September 19, 2013, President Barack Obama nominated Humetewa to serve as a United States district judge of the United States District Court for the District of Arizona, to the seat vacated by Judge Mary H. Murguia, who was elevated to the United States Court of Appeals for the Ninth Circuit on January 4, 2011. Humetewa was one of four Arizona judicial nominees announced by Obama that day who were chosen in consultation with Republican senators John McCain and Jeff Flake. On February 27, 2014, her nomination was reported out of the Senate Judiciary committee. On May 12, 2014, Senate Majority Leader Harry Reid filed for cloture on the nomination. On May 14, 2014, the United States Senate invoked cloture on her nomination by a 64–34 vote. Later that day, her nomination was confirmed by a 96–0 vote, with three Democrats and 1 Republican not voting. She received her judicial commission on May 16, 2014.

=== 2016 United States Supreme Court vacancy ===
Following the death of Justice Antonin Scalia in February 2016, Humetewa was mentioned as a possible consensus nominee for a vacancy on the United States Supreme Court, considered able to make it through the Republican-controlled Senate.

== Personal life ==
Humetewa is an enrolled member of the Hopi Nation. As of October 2021, she is the fourth Native-American federal judge actively serving on the bench.

== See also ==
- Barack Obama Supreme Court candidates
- Donald Trump Supreme Court candidates
- List of first women lawyers and judges in Arizona
- List of first women lawyers and judges in the United States
- List of Native American jurists
- Native American women in politics

Legal offices
Preceded by Mary H. Murguia	Judge of the United States District Court for the District of Arizona; 2014–present	Incumbent
