= Cornerstone 1791 =

US non-profit organization

- Formation: February 2019; 7 years ago
- Type: 501(c)(4)
- Tax ID no.: 83-3671451
- Legal status: active
- Headquarters: Kansas City, Missouri
- Key people: Eddie Greim, Chris Vas, Todd Graves
- Subsidiaries: Liberty Alliance USA
- Website: libertyallianceusa.com

Cornerstone 1791 is a non-profit 501(c)(4) (social welfare) political organization incorporated in the state of Missouri in February 2019. It is the sole owner of Liberty Alliance USA, an organization described by its executive director, Chris Vas, as "formed in order to grow the conservative movement in Missouri now and for decades to come."

== Founding ==
The group's website describes Liberty Alliance USA as "formed by a group of concerned citizens in order to give Missourians a place to stand together to promote Conservative principles and bring about positive reforms for our state. We are committed to fighting the reckless embrace of Socialism in Missouri and believe that true Conservatism is fundamental to ensuring opportunity for the next generation of our state." Cornerstone 1791 and Liberty Alliance USA share an address at the Kansas City law firm of former Missouri GOP Chairman Todd Graves. The group's registered agent is Eddie Greim, a partner in the same firm, which was reported by the St. Louis Post-Dispatch in August 2019 as part of an inquiry about the groups' political fundraising before the completion of their legal registration.

In May 2020, the state's Democratic Party filed a complaint with the state's ethics commission to ask whether the groups targeted the party's presumptive gubernatorial nominee in violation of a state law and should be forced to disclose its donors, an example of dark money politics.

In August 2020, the Missouri Ethics Commission completely dismissed the Democratic Party's complaint. Liberty Alliance called the complaint “frivolous” and stated that they would continue their work of fighting for conservative causes.

== Activities ==
=== Ballot measures ===
In 2020, it was reported that Cornerstone 1791 was fighting to repeal a successful 2018 Missouri ballot initiative called Clean Missouri that, among other things, put the design of state political districts in the hands of a bipartisan commission which required the final approval of an independent demographer.

Cornerstone 1791 was ultimately successful in passing Amendment 3 despite being outspent by opponents of the ballot measure by more than 20–1.

=== Ethics complaint ===
In April 2020, Liberty Alliance filed a complaint with the Missouri Ethics Commission alleging that Democratic State Representative Ian Mackey had violated state law by fundraising for his political campaign on state property. Liberty Alliance claims that this is the first complaint brought against an elected official for fundraising on state property since the new ethics laws were implemented in 2018.

On July 16, 2020, following an investigation by MEC staff, the Commission found reasonable grounds to believe that a violation of criminal law had occurred as alleged in the complaint and voted to refer the report to the Cole County Prosecutor for review. The commission was notified on May 4, 2021, that the matter had been presented to a Cole County Grand Jury on February 15, 2021.

=== Other activities ===
In 2020, Liberty Alliance also launched a statewide ad buy in order to urge Governor Mike Parson to sign Senate Bill 600 into law. The bill created tougher sentencing requirements for violent offenders, and was opposed by the states ACLU and NAACP chapters. Governor Parson ultimately signed the bill into law.

In the weeks before the Missouri gubernatorial election in October 2020, Liberty Alliance called for an investigation into the campaign of Nicole Galloway, the Democratic state auditor running for governor, to determine whether she used taxpayer money in her campaign. Galloway had used a state-paid press assistant to submit to the St. Louis Post-Dispatch an opinion piece about the state's restrictive abortion law, which had been signed by Mike Parson, the Republican governor or Missouri and Galloway's opponent in the election. Galloway's office called the complaint a “political stunt,” and on November 12, 2020, the Missouri Secretary of State Jay Ashcroft closed the investigation his office had conducted, having found no probable cause for the complaint. Parson was re-elected.

After the investigation was closed, Liberty Alliance vowed to investigate how many tax dollars were used by the State Auditor's Office to attempt to quash Jay Ashcroft's subpoena during the investigation.

In May 2022, Liberty Alliance launched a "heat map" purporting to show locations of "woke activity." The map of "hot spots" highlights specific schools and school districts in the state. Many of the pins redirect users to videos alleging that educational institutes in Missouri were pushing critical race theory.
