= Thomas M. DiBiagio =

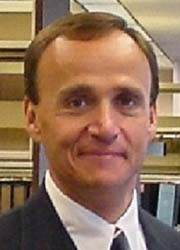
- DiBiagio in 2013

United States Attorney for the District of Maryland
- In office September 2001 – January 2, 2005
- President: George W. Bush
- Preceded by: Lynne A. Battaglia
- Succeeded by: Rod J. Rosenstein

Personal details
- Born: Thomas Michael DiBiagio; June 6, 1960 (age 66) Baltimore, Maryland, U.S.
- Education: Dickinson College (B.A.); University of Richmond (J.D.)

Thomas Michael DiBiagio is a former United States Attorney in the state of Maryland. After eight U.S. attorneys were fired by the Bush administration in 2006 for performance-related issues under a clause of the PATRIOT Act (see Dismissal of U.S. attorneys controversy), DiBiagio stated in March 2007 that he was ousted because of political pressure over public corruption investigations into the administration of then-Gov. Robert L. Ehrlich Jr.

However, he had also faced criticism in his office's handling of the John Allen Muhammad arrest in the D. C. sniper attacks. He ordered FBI agents to effect a federal arrest to gain jurisdiction over the local police task forces who had been leading the investigation. This arrest permanently stopped the local police task force's interrogation of the defendants. The snipers' motives would never be known.

2006 dismissal of U.S. attorneys controversy
- Timeline
- Summary of attorneys
- Congressional hearings
- List of dismissed attorneys
- All related articles
