= Dennis K. Burke =

American lawyer

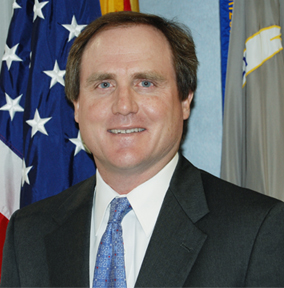

United States Attorney for the District of Arizona
- In office September 16, 2009 – August 30, 2011
- Appointed by: Barack Obama
- Preceded by: Diane Humetewa
- Succeeded by: John S. Leonardo

Personal details
- Born: 1962 (age 63–64) Chicago, Illinois
- Education: Georgetown University (BA); University of Arizona (JD)

Dennis K. Burke (born 1962) is a former United States Attorney for the District of Arizona.

== Early life and education ==
Burke was born in Chicago, Illinois in 1962. Burke received a bachelor's degree from Georgetown University in 1985 and earned his Juris Doctor from University of Arizona College of Law in 1988. After completing law school, Burke served as a law clerk for Judge James Moeller of the Arizona Supreme Court.

== Career ==
Republican Diane Humetewa stepped down on August 2, 2009. On Wednesday, September 16, 2009, Dennis K. Burke was sworn in as the United States Attorney for the District of Arizona. He was recently appointed to serve on the Attorney General's Advisory Committee (AGAC) which advises the Attorney General on policy, management, and operational issues at the Department of Justice. He was also selected to be the Chair of the AGAC Subcommittee on Border and Immigration Law Enforcement and a member of two other AGAC Subcommittees on Native American Issues and Civil Rights.

Burke has over 20 years of public service at both the Federal and State levels. Burke was most recently a Senior Advisor to Department of Homeland Security Secretary Janet Napolitano. He served as Chief of Staff to Arizona Governor Janet Napolitano from 2003 to 2008. Prior to that position, he worked in the Arizona Attorney General's Office as the Chief Deputy Attorney General. He is a former Assistant United States Attorney for the District of Arizona prosecuting drug trafficking cases, was the Assistant Attorney General for Legislative Affairs at the United States Department of Justice, a Senior Policy Analyst for the White House Domestic Policy Council during the Clinton Administration and a Majority Counsel for the United States Senate Judiciary Committee, where he worked on three Supreme Court nominations, intellectual property as well as crime and law enforcement legislation. Senator Dennis DeConcini (D-AZ) credited Burke and Rahm Emanuel with fostering and getting the 1994 Assault Weapon Ban passed.

He graduated from Georgetown University in 1985 and received a Juris Doctor degree in 1988 from University of Arizona, College of Law in Tucson, where he served as Executive Editor of the Arizona Law Review. After law school, Burke was a clerk for the Honorable James Moeller on the Arizona Supreme Court. He was also an adjunct professor of law at the Sandra Day O'Connor College of Law at Arizona State University. Burke has received numerous awards and commendations for his years in public service, including the Public Advocate Award from Chicanos Por La Causa in Phoenix, Arizona and the Minuteman Award from the Arizona National Guard.

On July 10, 2009, Burke was nominated by President Barack Obama to serve as the United States Attorney for the District of Arizona. He was confirmed by unanimous consent by the U.S. Senate on September 15, 2009.

In 2013, Burke partnered with Noah Kroloff, Mark Sullivan, David Aguilar, John Kaites and Jerry Reinsdorf to found Global Security and Innovative Strategies.
