= Bradley Schlozman =

American attorney

Bradley J. Schlozman
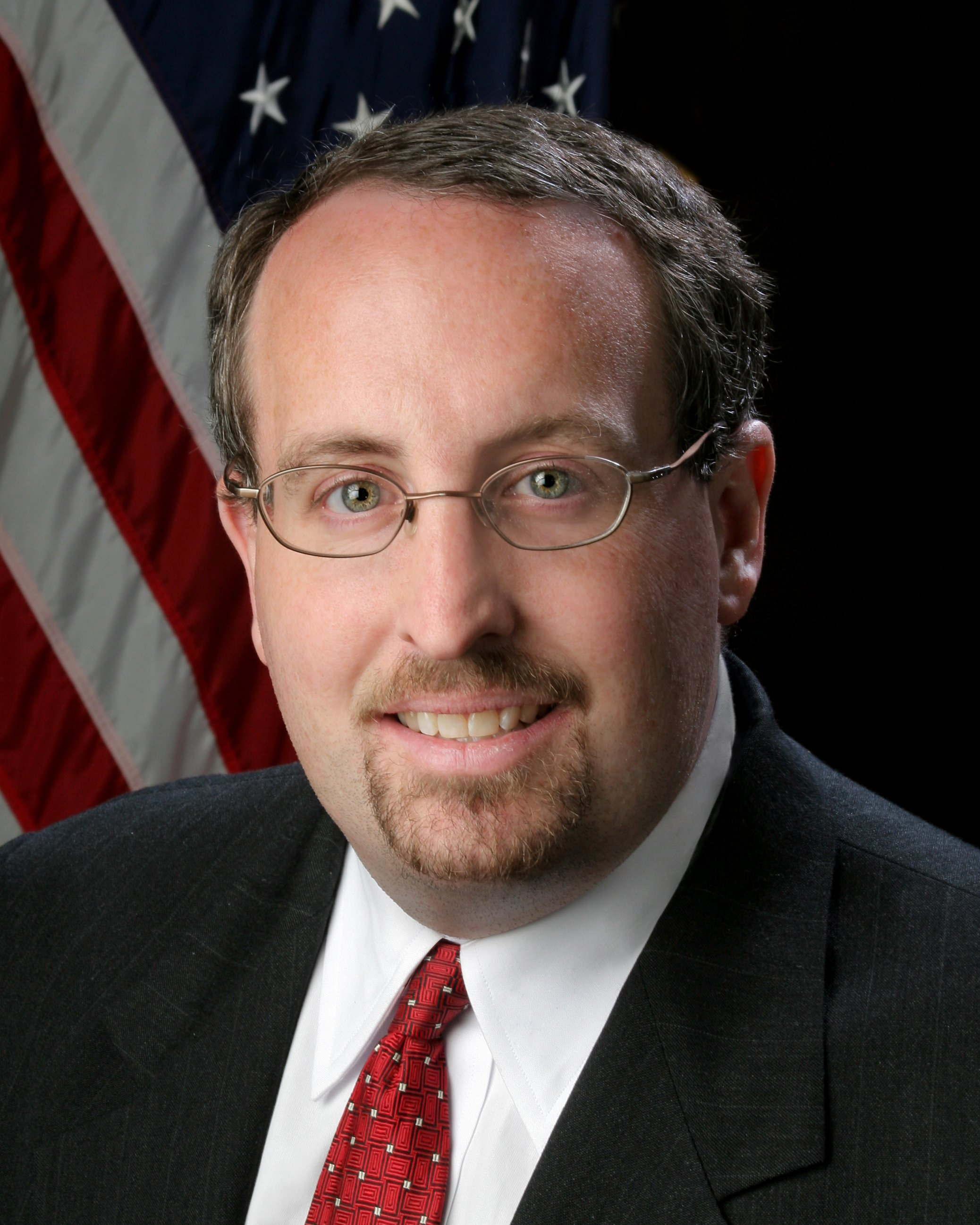

United States Attorney for the Western District of Missouri
- Acting
- In office 2006–2007
- President: George W. Bush
- Preceded by: Todd Graves
- Succeeded by: John F. Wood

United States Assistant Attorney General for the Civil Rights Division
- Acting
- In office 2003–2004
- President: George W. Bush
- Preceded by: Ralph F. Boyd, Jr.
- Succeeded by: Alexander Acosta

Personal details
- Born: Bradley Joseph Schlozman; February 6, 1971 (age 55)
- Education: University of Pennsylvania (BA); George Washington University (JD)
- Occupation: Attorney

Bradley Joseph Schlozman (born February 6, 1971) is an American attorney who served as acting head of the Civil Rights Division of the United States Department of Justice under Attorney General Alberto Gonzales. A member of the Republican Party, Schlozman was appointed by Gonzales as the interim U.S. Attorney for the Western District of Missouri, replacing Todd Graves, and he assumed that office on March 23, 2006. In April 2007, Schlozman left the U.S. Attorney position to work at the Executive Office for United States Attorneys. He was succeeded by John F. Wood as US attorney.

Schlozman and his office came under review by congressional and Senate investigators regarding the dismissal of U.S. attorneys and alleged inappropriate politicization of the Civil Rights Division. The Department of Justice Inspector General and the Office of Professional Responsibility alleged that Schlozman had violated the law and made false statements to Congress about his hiring decisions. While Schlozman testified to the Senate Judiciary Committee that his personnel decisions were not based on party affiliation, the report cited emails and other communications in which Schlozman discussed hiring "right-thinking Americans" and ridding the Civil Rights Division of "pinkos", "commies", and attorneys perceived to be unacceptably liberal. Federal prosecutors, however, declined to file charges of criminal perjury against Schlozman, drawing criticism from Senate Democrats.

Schlozman resigned from the Department of Justice on August 17, 2007, and accepted a position with the Hinkle Law Firm in Wichita, Kansas.

== Education, early career, and family ==
A native of Overland Park, Kansas, Schlozman graduated from Shawnee Mission South High School in Overland Park, Kansas before receiving a Bachelor of Arts degree in History and graduating magna cum laude with special distinction from The University of Pennsylvania. He obtained his Juris Doctor from The George Washington University Law School, graduating with honors. While at law school, Schlozman served as a legal intern in the United States Attorney's Office for the Western District of Missouri.

Schlozman served a two-year federal judicial clerkship with Chief U.S. District Judge G. Thomas VanBebber of the District of Kansas. He then spent a year clerking for U.S. Circuit Judge Mary Beck Briscoe of the U.S. Court of Appeals for the Tenth Circuit. In 1999, Schlozman moved to Washington, D.C., where he joined the Supreme Court and Appellate Litigation Practice at Howrey, Simon, Arnold & White, before moving on to the Department of Justice in November 2001.

Schlozman began service in the George W. Bush administration as Counsel to then-Deputy Attorney General Larry Thompson. He then served in various roles including Deputy Assistant Attorney General directly supervising the Criminal, Voting, Employment, and Special Litigation Sections of the Civil Rights Division, five months as Acting Assistant Attorney General of the Civil Rights Division, and Principal Deputy Assistant Attorney General for the Civil Rights Division at the United States Department of Justice. Following his tenure in the Civil Rights Division, Schlozman was appointed the interim U.S. Attorney for the Western District of Missouri.

== Personnel controversy ==
In June 2007, Schlozman was questioned by Democrats on the U.S. Senate Judiciary Committee regarding allegedly inappropriate politicized hiring policies during his tenure in the Civil Rights Division, charges which Schlozman denied. The Department of Justice's Inspector General and Office of Professional Responsibility subsequently conducted an investigation and issued a report on Jan. 13, 2009, concluding that Schlozman violated the Civil Service Reform Act by hiring attorneys on the basis of their political affiliation and later made false statements in his sworn testimony to Congress about his hiring decisions. Federal prosecutors later declined to prosecute Schlozman.

== Cases ==
=== Cases prior to Missouri appointment ===
==== Georgia voter I.D. law ====
In 2005, Georgia passed a controversial voter I.D. law which required that all voters to show photo identification at the polls, and eliminated previously accepted forms of voter identification, including social security cards, birth certificates or utility bills. As required by the Voting Rights Act, "Georgia and other states with a history of voter discrimination" (mostly southern states) are required to show that law changes will not have a discriminatory impact on minority voters, and to get approval by the Department of Justice under 1965 Voting Rights Act According to rumors reported in the press, all of the staff of the Civil Rights division of DOJ, save one, recommended against the new law's approval, but Schlozman and other political appointees overruled the staff and approved it. The law was initially held unconstitutional as against the Georgia state constitution, but that ruling was reversed by a unanimous decision of the Georgia Supreme Court. In federal court, U.S. District Judge Harold L. Murphy issued an injunction against the law, holding that it was constitutionally suspect but declining to consider whether it offended the Voting Rights Act. Subsequent to the federal court decision, Schlozman wrote an op-ed in the Atlanta Journal-Constitution defending the Department of Justice's decision to pre-clear the Voter ID law under the Voting Rights Act. Although the Justice Department's actions were heavily criticized by liberal groups, no court has ever held that the Georgia ID law runs afoul of the Voting Rights Act, the only statutory provision considered by the DOJ in issuing its approval of the law. In fact, the U.S. Court of Appeals for the 11th Circuit upheld the law against all constitutional challenges.

==== Texas redistricting ====
In 2003, Tom DeLay spearheaded a major redistricting plan for the state of Texas. Justice Department lawyers wrote a memo opposing the plan, concluding that it violated the 1965 Voting Rights Act. The memo was endorsed unanimously by lawyers and analysts from the Department's Voting section. Nevertheless, Schlozman and several other political appointees overruled the lawyers' objections and approved DeLay's plan. In League of United Latin American Citizens v. Perry, the Supreme Court issued a complex 100-plus page concluding that all but one of the thirty-two district in the Texas redistricting plan satisfied the requirements of the Voting Rights Act.

==== Lawsuit against Missouri ====
In 2005, while Schlozman was serving in the Civil Rights Division, the DOJ filed a lawsuit against Missouri accusing the state of failing to make a "reasonable effort" to eliminate ineligible people from voter rolls and improperly removing certain voters from the voter rolls prematurely. Although the then-US Attorney for Missouri, Todd Graves, whom Schlozman later succeeded after Graves' forced resignation, claims to have refused to sign off on the lawsuit, the Complaint filed in the case was signed by both Graves and an Assistant U.S. Attorney from his office, in addition to Schlozman and Assistant Attorney General Wan J. Kim. On April 13, 2007, a federal district judge dismissed the lawsuit, asserting that the Secretary of State couldn't police local registration rolls. The Justice Department appealed that ruling, however, and the U.S. Court of Appeals for the 8th Circuit later reversed the district court's decision. In March 2009, after a new political leadership had been installed at the Justice Department in the wake of the presidential election, the Justice Department asked a judge to dismiss the lawsuit, essentially ending the case and dropping all charges.

=== Missouri Western District ===
==== Dismissal of U.S. attorneys controversy ====
The forced resignation of U.S. Attorney Todd Graves and subsequent appointment of Schlozman is part of the dismissal of U.S. attorneys controversy, which concerns the replacement of a number of U.S. attorneys by the George W. Bush administration in its second term.

==== ACORN voter registration prosecutions ====
In addition to the complaints regarding the lawsuit against the State of Missouri, described above, attention has focused on his lawsuit against several former employees of the activist group ACORN.

In the summer of 2006, ACORN "paid workers $8 an hour to sign up new voters in poor neighborhoods around the country. Later, ACORN's Kansas City chapter discovered that several workers filled out registration forms fraudulently instead of finding real people to sign up. ACORN fired the workers and alerted law enforcement."

Just five days before the 2006 election, Schlozman announced the indictments of four of the former ACORN workers, who all ultimately pleaded guilty to the voter registration charges. The election featured an extremely close Senate race between the incumbent Jim Talent and eventual winner Claire McCaskill. Former U.S. Attorneys Todd Graves and David Iglesias, expressed surprise at the indictments, claiming that they appeared to violate longstanding Department of Justice policy to avoid overtly politically related prosecutions during an election. Joseph D. Rich, a 35-year veteran of the Department of Justice and chief of its voting section from 1999 to 2005, wrote a Los Angeles Times op-ed criticizing the prosecutions as politically motivated.

Schlozman testified before the Senate Judiciary Committee on June 5, 2007. Responding to concerns about a possible political motivation for pushing forward with prosecution immediately before the 2006 election, Schlozman stated that the department's public integrity officials had approved the prosecution and that he "did not think it was going to affect the election at all." However, he later amended his testimony, indicating that he had not been "directed" to indict for voter fraud, days before the November 2006 election in question, but that Schlozman himself made the decision to indict, after his First Assistant U.S. Attorney had consulted with the Washington DOJ Election Crimes Branch. According to Schlozman, Department of Justice policy—as explicitly underscored by the director of the Department's Elections Crimes Branch—was that the prosecution of ACORN employees for criminal voting offenses was not improper because the prosecutions pertained to "... voter registration fraud (which examined conduct during voter registration), not fraud during an ongoing or contested election."

==== Jackson County Executive Katheryn Shields ====
In January 2007, Schlozman's office indicted Democratic Jackson County Executive Katheryn Shields, who had just left office, on charges of wire fraud in connection with a scheme for an appraiser to fraudulently inflate the price of her home that she was selling. Shields asked the court to dismiss the charges on the basis that they were politically motivated, but the court refused to order disclosure of internal Justice Department documentation and rejected her argument. The day after the indictment, Shields filed for an ultimately unsuccessful run for Mayor of Kansas City, Missouri. She was subsequently acquitted in the criminal case although her co-defendants—the appraiser and the appraiser's associates—were convicted. Shields then sued the government to recover $202,000 in legal fees. However the court concluded that "[t]here is no evidence that the prosecutors in this matter acted with maliciousness or with an intent to harass, annoy, or embarrass [Shields] nor that the evidence was objectively deficient.".
