= Margaret Chiara =

American lawyer (born 1943)

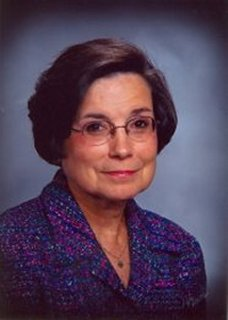

United States Attorney for the Western District of Michigan
- In office October 23, 2001 – March 16, 2007
- President: George W. Bush
- Preceded by: Michael H. Dettmer
- Succeeded by: Russell Stoddard (interim)

Personal details
- Born: 1943 (age 82–83) Brooklyn, New York
- Party: Republican
- Education: Fordham University; Pace University; Rutgers Law School
- Profession: Attorney

Margaret M. Chiara is a former United States Attorney for the Western District of Michigan. A Republican, she served from 2001 until she was dismissed in the dismissal of U.S. attorneys controversy on March 16, 2007. She had been Michigan's first female U.S. attorney.

== Early career ==
Chiara received her undergraduate degree from Fordham University, a Master's degree from Pace University and her J.D. from Rutgers University Law School. For twelve years she was a teacher and educational administrator, with a masters in administration from Pace University and an undergraduate degree is from Fordham University. Her interest in education law and school finance reform led to Rutgers Law School. Chiara was an associate with French and Lawrence, a private law firm, in Cassopolis, Michigan from 1979 to 1982. Subsequently, she was twice elected Cass County Prosecutor, and was the first woman elected to serve as president of the Prosecuting Attorneys Association of Michigan (PAAM). From 1987 to 1998, she was Administrator of the Trial Court Assessment Commission. Then in 1999, Ms. Chiara joined the staff of the Office of the Chief Justice at the Michigan Supreme Court as the Policy and Planning Director.

== Career as U.S. Attorney and dismissal ==
Ms. Chiara was nominated to the position of United States Attorney on September 4, 2001, by President George W. Bush to succeed Michael Dettmer. Chiara was unanimously confirmed by the United States Senate on October 23, 2001. On March 23, 2007, The New York Times reported that Chiara was told by a senior Justice Department official that she was being removed to make way for a new attorney that the Bush administration wanted to groom. "To say it was about politics may not be pleasant, but at least it is truthful," Chiara said. "Poor performance was not a truthful explanation."

AP reported that during her tenure, "the jurisdiction has seen a 15 percent increase in felony prosecutions and convictions. She developed an attorney training and mentoring program that now serves as a national model, her office said."
