= Daniel G. Knauss =

American lawyer

United States Attorney for the District of Arizona
- In office 2007–2007
- Appointed by: George W. Bush
- Preceded by: Paul K. Charlton
- Succeeded by: Diane Humetewa
- In office 1993–1993
- Appointed by: Bill Clinton
- Preceded by: Linda A. Akers
- Succeeded by: Janet Napolitano

Daniel G. Knauss was the Acting United States Attorney for the District of Arizona. Knauss served in that position in 1993 until Janet Napolitano was appointed by President Bill Clinton as United States Attorney for the District of Arizona. Knauss also served in the same position in 2007, receiving an appointment from George W. Bush. As of 2007, Knauss has worked for 34 years as an assistant district attorney. He retired in 2008.
