= Rick Renzi =

American politician (born 1958)

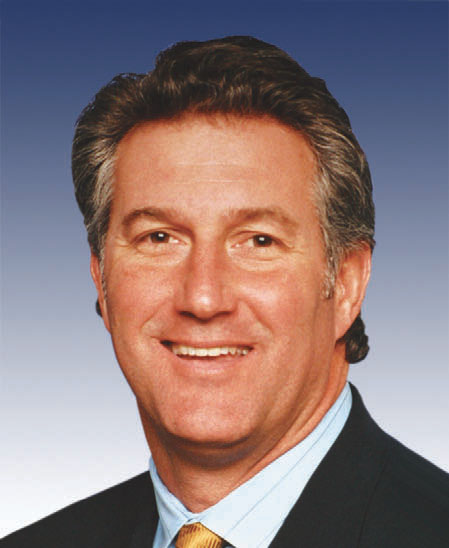
- Official portrait, c. 2005

Member of the U.S. House of Representatives from Arizona's 1st district
- In office January 3, 2003 – January 3, 2009
- Preceded by: Jeff Flake
- Succeeded by: Ann Kirkpatrick

Personal details
- Born: Richard George Renzi; June 11, 1958 (age 68) Fort Monmouth, New Jersey, U.S.
- Party: Republican
- Spouse: Roberta Renzi
- Children: 12
- Education: Northern Arizona University (BS); Catholic University (JD)

Richard George Renzi (born June 11, 1958) is an American politician who was a Republican member of the United States House of Representatives representing Arizona's 1st congressional district from 2003 until 2009.

In 2013, he was convicted on federal criminal charges against him for his involvement in a land-swap deal. After submitting a formal Inspector General complaint of prosecutorial misconduct to the Justice Department, including allegations of fabricated evidence by the team led by federal prosecutor Jack Smith, Renzi was pardoned by President Donald Trump on January 20, 2021.

== Early life, education ==
Renzi is one of five siblings born into an Italian-American family in Fort Monmouth, New Jersey. He attended high school in Annandale, Virginia, before moving to Sierra Vista, Arizona, in 1975, where his father, U.S. Army Major General Eugene Carmen Renzi (d. 2008), served at Fort Huachuca. Renzi graduated from Buena High School and attended Northern Arizona University (NAU), earning a B.S. in criminal justice in 1980. He played football for NAU and was a starting offensive lineman.

=== Family ===
Renzi and his wife, Roberta S. Renzi, are the parents of 12 children. Like Renzi's siblings, his children all have forenames that begin with the letter "R".

== Career prior to Congress ==
Where Renzi lived and what he did throughout the 1986–1997 period is unclear. In a letter to the Arizona Daily Sun in July 2002, Renzi said "The only time I have not lived in Arizona is when I served our nation overseas on a Defense Department program, or when I entered law school at age 39" [which would be 1997 or 1998].

However, according to an August 2002 Associated Press article, Renzi said that between college, starting in the late 1970s, and his return some 20 years later, he had lived in Flagstaff for only a total of seven years. The AP article also said "Renzi made much of his money while living in Burke, Virginia, about 20 minutes from downtown Washington. He has owned a $765,000 two-story, six-bedroom home on five acres there since 1991, according to Fairfax County, Virginia, property records."

In 1989, Renzi started Renzi & Company (now called the Patriot Insurance Agency), a company that offers insurance to nonprofit organizations such as crisis pregnancy centers, pregnancy care clinics, maternity homes, PTAs, PTOs, and local service organizations. In 2006, Renzi said that he decided to enter politics because of his experiences as a member of National Association of Professional Insurance Agents. Renzi was a property/casualty agent and a member of PIA of Virginia & D.C. He said his first taste of the political process was attending a PIA Federal Legislative Summit. "I had a chance to interact with a lot of the congressmen and Senators, and I fell in love with it", Renzi said.

In 1997 or 1998, Renzi began to take law courses at The Catholic University of America in Washington D.C. He finished his coursework in December 2001 and graduated with a J.D. in 2002. While he was studying law, he claimed he was an unpaid intern in Senator Jon Kyl's office for two months in 1999, and in 2001 he spent several months as an unpaid intern for Representative Jim Kolbe. Senator Kyl later questioned the accuracy of Renzi's description of his work in Kyl's office, saying he was never employed there.

== U.S. House of Representatives ==
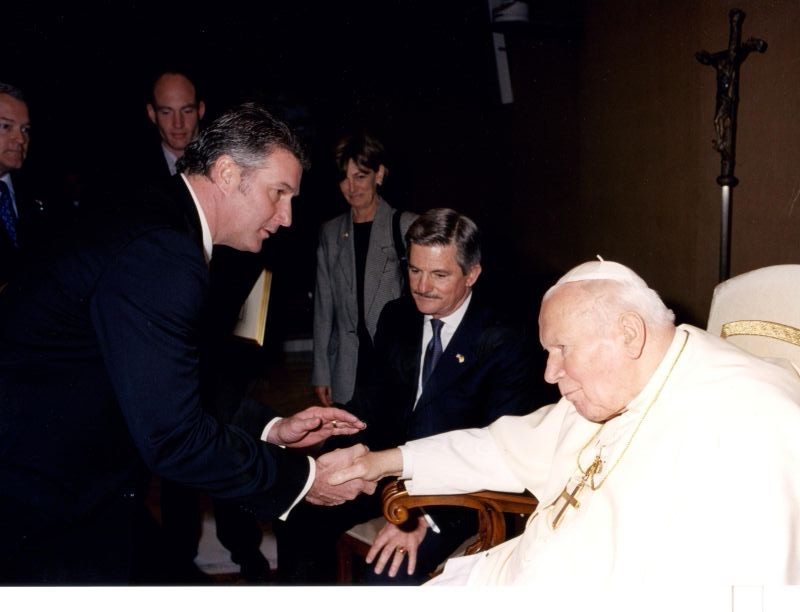
Renzi greeting Pope John Paul II in 2003

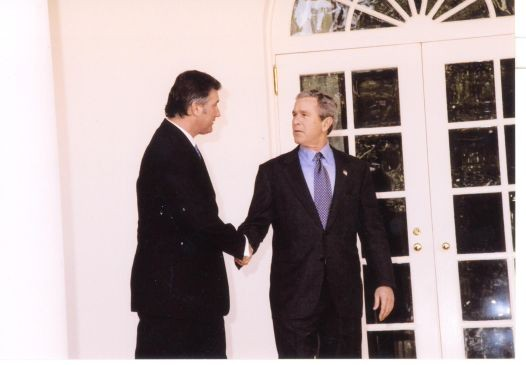
Renzi greeting President George W. Bush in 2005

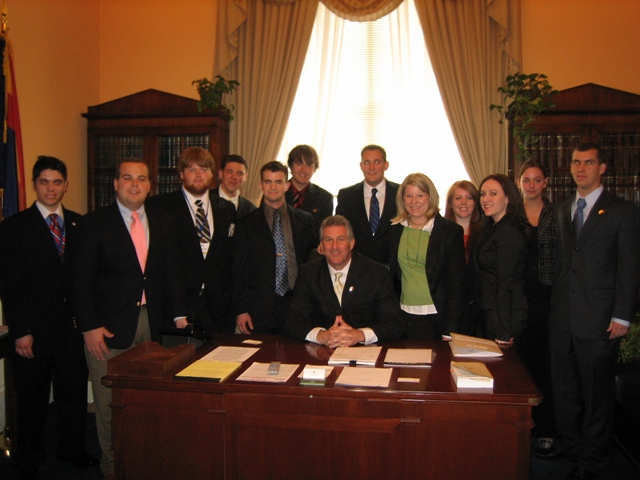
Renzi with the Arizona College Republicans in 2007

=== Move to Arizona ===
Renzi moved his official residence from Virginia to Arizona in 1999, registering to vote in Santa Cruz County. In 2001, he bought a $216,000 home in Flagstaff, moving his voting registration there in December of that year.

In 2002, Renzi acknowledged that he returned to Arizona with the intention of running for Congress, but defended his state ties. He noted that between college and his return to Arizona, he lived in Flagstaff for a total of seven years. There is proof Renzi was living in Arizona after college because, Renzi and his wife did have several children who were born in Sierra Vista, AZ. Renzi also said he owned more than 400 acres (1.6 km^{2}) in northern Arizona through a real estate development and improvement business, in addition to a small vineyard and ranch in Sonoita, Arizona, west of Sierra Vista, in the 8th congressional district, and a home in Kingman. During the campaign, Renzi said "Let the chips fall where they may if I'm a carpetbagger."

=== 2002 election ===
==== Primary election ====
Renzi won a hotly contested Republican primary election against five other candidates; his closest opponents were Lewis Noble Tenney, a former Navajo County supervisor, and conservative radio personality Sydney Hay of Munds Park. Renzi outspent his primary opponents by a substantial sum of money. He invested $585,000 of his own money and raised another $100,000 to run radio and TV ads throughout the district. Renzi received 24.4 percent of the 46,585 votes cast in the Republican primary, with half of his votes coming from Yavapai County.

The 2002 Democratic primary, also hotly contested, was narrowly won by George Cordova, a party outsider who ran against several better-known candidates, including Stephen Udall, Diane Prescott and Fred Duval. (There was no incumbent for the seat, in a new district created after the 2000 census gave the state two more Representatives.)

==== General election ====
Renzi received significant support from the national Republican party in the race: President Bush visited twice, including a fundraiser; Vice President Cheney appeared at a fund-raising luncheon; Secretary of the Interior Gale Norton visited the district to support Renzi; and so did Mel Martinez, secretary of the Department of Housing and Urban Development.

The campaign included the heavy use of negative advertising attacking Cordova, including accusing him of cheating investors out of $1 million in a failed business venture, failing to pay income and business taxes, and living in California. Cordova denied the charges but had no funds to buy many television ads to refute them. The Renzi campaign also made heavy use of automated telephone calls throughout the district with various claims and innuendos about Cordova. Renzi said of the $2 million spent on negative ads, that he "took no joy in any of that." Renzi said he had tried to tell the National Republican Congressional Committee that the negative ads were the wrong way to go.

During the 2002 election campaign, Renzi proposed that Walnut Canyon National Monument in Northern Arizona be renamed the "National Park of the American Flag" with the addition an American flag theme to the park, including displays of U.S. flags throughout history. This was in response to proposals by local citizens that Walnut Canyon National Monument be expanded and given National Park status. Renzi's proposal was widely ridiculed, and he has not promoted it since.

On election day, Renzi defeated Cordova by 49 percent to 46 percent, a difference of about 6,000 votes.

==== Campaign finances ====
Renzi spent $436,590 of his own money on the election. In addition to large donations from his father's defense company, Mantech International, Mantech executives were the largest single source of outside money for the campaign.

In 2004, the Federal Election Commission completed an audit of Renzi's campaign committee, "Rick Renzi for Congress." The audit found that Renzi's campaign overstated its cash on hand by about $64,000, and that employers or occupations for 200 contributors were not listed, though required by law. The FEC also concluded that the committee had illegally financed much of the campaign with $369,090 of loans that came from "impermissible" corporate funds. Most of those loans were part of the $436,000 that Renzi put into his own campaign. Renzi was fined $1,000 in November 2005 by the FEC for underreported receipts stemming from what his campaign called a software glitch. During the summer before the 2006 election, the FEC dropped all charges related to the 2002 alleged use of impermissible corporate funds for his campaign.

=== 2004 re-election ===
In preparation for the 2004 campaign, the Democratic Party in Arizona tapped Paul Babbitt, Coconino County commissioner and the brother of Bruce Babbitt, to run for the seat and pressured all other candidates with the exception of political unknown Bob Donahue to bow out of the primary in order to clear the way for Babbitt to run against Renzi without a costly primary contest. Paul Babbitt's campaign was named a top national priority by most major Democratic fundraisers and liberal weblogs, because a plurality of Arizona 1st Congressional District voters are registered Democrats and because Renzi won so narrowly in 2002. Unlike the Cordova campaign in 2002, which received only token support from the national Democratic Party organizations, the Babbitt campaign received major support; nonetheless, it was unable to match Renzi's fundraising.

=== 2006 re-election ===
Renzi faced no opposition from his own party in the Republican primary. Five Democratic Party candidates, including Bob Donahue, Mike Caccioppoli, Susan Friedman, Ellen Simon, and Vic McKerlie, ran in the 2006 primary in September, which was won by Ellen Simon, an attorney and community activist. David Schlosser was also in the November general election on the Libertarian Party ticket.

Renzi won his re-election against Simon, 52% to 43%.

On August 23, 2007, Renzi announced he would not seek another term.

=== Issues and positions ===
In 2002, in response to a question about spiraling health care costs, Renzi said "In order to keep health insurance costs competitive, we must allow the self-employed to take annual tax deductions for their health-care costs. We must change the health insurance industry by allowing employees to purchase their own health-care policy. This would allow for personal ownership of health-care policies, which would provide portability, more choice and thus more competition, which leads to lower health-care premiums."

Renzi was named one of the American Legion's "Unsung Heroes" of the 108th Congress. American Legion National Commander John Brieden noted that "The 108th Congress passed a record increase in Department of Veterans Affairs health care funding for the current fiscal year, and it reduced the number of service-disabled military retirees subject to a 'disability tax' on their retired pay." Brieden said "I commend Representative Renzi for taking a leadership role in making that happen."

In 2004, Renzi and Representative Jon Porter introduced legislation to split the Ninth Circuit court, currently the largest circuit in the U.S., which includes Arizona, into three smaller circuits. John Ensign of Nevada introduced similar legislation in the Senate.

Renzi was generally a supporter of expanded legal immigration into the United States and supported expansion of guest worker programs and the H-1B visa. He did strongly support using technology to enforce border security.

In June 2006, the House accepted an amendment proposed by Renzi to increase tribal law enforcement funding by $5 million and decrease spending for international organizations such as the United Nations by the same amount.

On December 14, 2005, he voted for the reauthorization of the Patriot Act. On June 29, 2005, he voted for the increase of funds by $25 million for anti-marijuana print and TV ads.

== Controversies ==
In September 2006, Renzi was named one of the "20 Most Corrupt Members of Congress" in a report by Citizens for Responsibility and Ethics in Washington, a watchdog group founded in 2005 by former Democratic congressional staffers. Renzi was also listed in the first report by the organization in January 2006, when he was one of 13 named members. The organization said "His ethics issues stem from the outside income earned by his administrative assistant and from legislation he sponsored that benefitted his father." He was subsequently listed in CREW's 2007 and 2008 reports as well.

=== ManTech International Corp. ===
Renzi had been criticized for consistently introducing and voting in favor of bills benefiting his father's defense company, ManTech International Corp., a Fairfax, Virginia,-based defense contractor. Renzi's father, retired Major General Eugene Renzi, was an executive vice president of the firm, until his death in February 2008. ManTech had $467 million in contracts at the Army's Fort Huachuca with options for an additional $1.1 billion between 2004 through 2008. In addition, the company, which has an office in Sierra Vista, Arizona, was the largest contributor to Renzi's 2002 congressional campaign and the second largest in his 2004 campaign.

In 2003, Renzi sponsored legislation (signed into law in November 2003) that put hundreds of millions of dollars to Eugene's business while, according to environmentalists, devastating the San Pedro River. The provision exempted Fort Huachuca, in Sierra Vista, Arizona, from maintaining water levels in the San Pedro River as called for in an agreement made in 2002 with the U.S. Fish and Wildlife Service. Renzi claimed he introduced the measure to prevent the closing of the Fort and to promote its enlargement. Neither the fort nor the river is located in Renzi's Congressional district.

On October 25, 2006, just two weeks before Election Day, The New York Times reported that federal authorities had opened an inquiry into the case. According to the Times, the "officials said the inquiry was at an early stage and that no search warrants had been issued, suggesting that investigators had yet to determine whether there was a basis to open a formal investigation or empanel a grand jury." Federal investigators in Arizona reported that unexplained delays were encountered in getting permission from Washington for investigations prior to the 2006 election.

On April 19, 2007, the FBI raided his family business, and he temporarily resigned from the House Intelligence Committee.

On February 22, 2008, Renzi was indicted on multiple federal charges as a result of the investigation.

=== 2005 land swap ===
According to the Phoenix New Times, in 2002 Renzi sold off a half-interest in his real estate investment business to a fellow investor, James Sandlin, for $200,000. Renzi used the money for his 2002 congressional campaign. In 2003, Renzi sold the remainder of the business to Sandlin, for somewhere between $1 million and $5 million, according to financial records, retaining a "future development interest".

In October 2005, three years after the business transaction with Sandlin, Renzi announced he'd be introducing a bill in Congress that would include a swap of land owned by Sandlin (not in Renzi's district) for federal land near Florence, Arizona. A week after Renzi's announcement, Sandlin sold his land for $4.5 million, a much higher price than he paid for it.

Renzi told the New Times that he did nothing wrong and that sometime after his announcement he recused himself from the bill after a lobbyist questioned his connection to Sandlin. The land swap never became law.

In 2007 news came of another $200,000 payment that Sandlin made to Renzi, this one in 2005, that Renzi failed to report on financial disclosure forms.

On October 24, 2006, the Associated Press reported that the U.S. attorney's office in Arizona has opened an investigation into the land swap deal. The US Attorney for Arizona, Paul Charlton, had initiated the investigation in September 2006.

John Wilke in The Wall Street Journal writes,

That investigation became a formal public-corruption probe by a federal grand jury in Tucson. The grand jury authorized a search warrant of a Renzi family business. Investigators uncovered evidence that Mr. Renzi received a cash payment from his former business partner, funneled through a family wine company, after a second investor group pursuing an unrelated land swap agreed to pay $4 million for the alfalfa field, according to people contacted in the course of the two-year investigation.

Mr. Renzi denied any wrongdoing and said that he intended to cooperate with the investigation. The search of the family business, he said in a statement, was "the first step toward getting the truth out." His lawyer says the cash payment he received was to settle an unrelated debt.

The case added fuel to the firestorm over the Bush administration's firing of federal prosecutors. Paul Charlton, the U.S. Attorney who had been overseeing the case, was among those dismissed at the behest of the White House. A spokesman for Mr. Renzi dismissed as "a political hatchet job" the suggestion that Mr. Charlton's firing was connected to the probe of Mr. Renzi. Attorney General Alberto Gonzales told Congress that none of the dismissals were politically motivated, and said the Justice Department is committed to battling corruption.

On February 22, 2008, a Federal Grand Jury in Arizona handed up a 35-count indictment charging Renzi with conspiracy, wire fraud, money laundering extortion and insurance fraud.

=== Dismissal of U.S. attorneys controversy ===
After the land swap controversy was revealed, an unnamed official from the US Department of Justice (DOJ) cautioned the media not to jump to conclusions regarding the inquiry into Renzi, saying it "is not a well-developed investigation, by any means. A tip comes into the department. The department is obligated to follow up ... and we do that. People are assuming there is evidence of some crime," even though that is not necessarily true. The official added, "Be careful. I can confirm to you a very early investigation. But I want to caution you not to chop this guy's (Renzi's) head off."

According to the Arizona Republic, "The federal official would not discuss whether the Justice Department was being manipulated for political purposes. However, the official said it is unusual for the department to publicly acknowledge concerns about the accuracy of media reports." In the same story, the official said the Justice Department contacted at least two newspapers about "chunks of stuff in their stories that's wrong."

Shortly after initiating the investigation of Renzi, the US Attorney for Arizona, Paul Charlton, was belatedly added to a previously assembled list of US attorneys the Justice Department wanted to remove, in an effort that would become the dismissal of U.S. attorneys controversy. In February 2005, Charlton had been on the "retain" list of United States Attorney General Alberto Gonzales's chief of staff, Kyle Sampson, but "by September of 2006 – after it became clear that Charlton had launched an investigation of Rep. Rick Renzi, R-Ariz, – Sampson included the Arizona prosecutor on another list of U.S. attorneys 'we now should consider pushing out'." Sampson made the comment in a September 13, 2006, letter to then-White House Counsel Harriet Miers.

On March 19, 2007, the White House released 3,000 pages of records connected to the controversy, including emails sent by Charlton to the Justice Department about his dismissal. On December 21, 2006, Charlton sent a message to William W. Mercer, the third-ranking official in the DOJ, writing, "Media now asking if I was asked to resign over leak in Congressman Renzi investigation." Charlton never received a response from Mercer, about whom ethical questions had also been raised.

The Wall Street Journal explained further allegations: that the DOJ under Gonzales had intentionally delayed part of the investigation of Renzi until after the November 2006 election. They wrote:

The delays, which postponed key approvals in the case until after the election, raise new questions about whether Alberto Gonzales or other officials may have weighed political issues in some investigations. ... Investigators pursuing the Renzi case had been seeking clearance from senior Justice Department officials on search warrants, subpoenas and other legal tools for a year before the election, people close to the case said. ... ... the investigation clearly moved slowly: Federal agents opened the case no later than June 2005, yet key witnesses didn't get subpoenas until early this year, those close to the case said. The first publicly known search – a raid of a Renzi family business by the Federal Bureau of Investigation – was[n't] carried out [until April 2007]. ...

Further, the Journal noted that investigators had unsuccessfully solicited the administration for clearance to tap Renzi's phone for months. That clearance was finally given nineteen months later, in October 2006. Unfortunately for the investigators, word broke of the investigation soon after, disrupting the usefulness of their wiretap.

On April 24, 2007, Renzi stepped down from the House Financial Services and Natural Resources committees, as more revelations connected him to the U.S. attorneys controversy. During that afternoon, Paul Charlton, a United States Attorney from Arizona, related to House investigators that Brian Murray, Renzi's top aide, called Charlton spokesman Wyn Hornbuckle shortly after news of Renzi's investigation became public, making inquiries related to information on the case. Charlton, in turn, notified the Department of Justice about the call. Justice, it was discovered, had neglected to notify Congress of the contact.

=== Patty Roe ===
In December 2005, Renzi hired Patty Roe, the wife of Jason Roe, the chief of staff of Representative Tom Feeney (R-FL), as his full-time administrative assistant. In that position, she was paid $95,000 per year. Renzi also pays her $5,000 per month ($60,000 per year) as a fundraising consultant (she ran her own consulting business before being hired by Renzi). To be in compliance with the rules, Roe had to do all her fundraising work before clocking in to work as Renzi's administrative assistant, or after work. Renzi's spokesman Vartan Djihanian said that this is the case: "Whatever fundraising she does ... is on her time."

Roe also received about $30,000 in fundraising fees in 2006 from four other House members: Tom Feeney; Lincoln Díaz-Balart and Mario Díaz-Balart, both of Florida; and Patrick McHenry of North Carolina. Renzi's office said those payments were for services rendered in 2005. There is no evidence that Roe's activities are not in compliance with House ethics standards.

=== Reported floor fight ===
Renzi was an opponent of embryonic stem cell research. In May 2005, he engaged in an argument on the House floor with Congressman Mark Kirk (R-IL). The argument ensued after Renzi had learned that Kirk and the moderate Republican Main Street Partnership commissioned secret polling in the districts of Renzi and other members of Congress who oppose stem cell research. Renzi said, "I was yelling at him. I told him it's absolutely unprecedented that Republicans would pay for a push poll to attack another Republican on such a core belief of mine ... You're not going to change my view on the issue, as a father of 12."

=== Funds from DeLay's PAC ===
Renzi also received $30,000 in campaign contributions from former House Majority Leader Tom DeLay's ARMPAC.

== Indictment, conviction and pardon ==
On April 19, 2007, the FBI raided his family business as part of an investigation, and he temporarily resigned from the House Intelligence Committee. On February 22, 2008, after Phoenix New Times columnist Sarah Fenske broke a story about the 2002 campaign financing embezzlement, Renzi was indicted on multiple federal charges. The charges included conspiracy, wire fraud, money laundering, extortion and insurance fraud. In October 2009, the government added a conspiracy to commit insurance fraud charge to the indictment. It alleged that Renzi and others willfully embezzled from a risk retention company called Spirit Mountain. In June 2010, Federal District Judge David C. Bury, ruled that procedural errors precluded the prosecution from using available wire-taps as evidence in the case going forward.

In 2011, Renzi appealed to the United States Court of Appeals for the Ninth Circuit, asking the court to stop his prosecution. A three-judge panel held that Renzi's prosecution could go forward and the full court let pass a petition to rehear that decision en banc, allowing the case against Renzi to proceed. Renzi appealed to the Supreme Court but it also declined to hear his appeal so he was put on trial.

On June 12, 2013, a jury convicted Renzi on 17 of 32 counts in his corruption case. That October, Renzi was sentenced to three years in prison. Renzi appealed his conviction to the Ninth Circuit, but the court upheld the jury's verdict. The United States Supreme Court denied certiorari.

On February 27, 2015, Renzi reported to Federal Correctional Institution, Morgantown West Virginia, to serve his 3-year prison sentence. He was Bureau of Prisons inmate 29375-208 and was released on January 6, 2017.

In April 2019, the law firm Mayer Brown submitted a formal complaint of prosecutorial misconduct to the Justice Department, including allegations of fabricated evidence by the team led by federal prosecutor Jack Smith.

On January 20, 2021, Renzi received a full pardon from President Donald Trump during his last hours as president. Citing numerous examples of alleged prosecutorial misconduct, including a charge of fabricated evidence by the team led by Jack Smith, the pardon was supported by Representative Paul Gosar, Representative Tom Cole, former Representative Tom DeLay, former Representative Jack Kingston, former Representative Todd Tiahrt, former Representative John Doolittle, former Representative Duncan L. Hunter, former Representative Richard Pombo, former Representative Charles H. Taylor, former Representative Dan Burton, Larry Weitzner, and the National Institute of Family and Life Advocates.

== Electoral history ==
Arizona's 1st congressional district: Results 2002–2006
Year	Democrat	Votes	Pct	Republican	Votes	Pct	3rd party	Party	Votes	Pct
2002	George Cordova	79,730	46%	Rick Renzi	85,967	49%	Edwin Porr	Libertarian	8,990	5%
2004	Paul Babbitt	91,776	36%	Rick Renzi	148,315	59%	John Crockett	Libertarian	13,260	5%
2006	Ellen Simon	88,691	43%	Rick Renzi	105,646	52%	David Schlosser	Libertarian	9,802	5%

== See also ==
- List of American federal politicians convicted of crimes
- List of federal political scandals in the United States

U.S. House of Representatives
Preceded by Jeff Flake	Member of the U.S. House of Representatives from Arizona's 1st congressional district 2003–2009	Succeeded by Ann Kirkpatrick
U.S. order of precedence (ceremonial)
Preceded by Liz Cheney as Former U.S. Representative	Order of precedence of the United States as Former U.S. Representative	Succeeded by Tom O'Halleran as Former U.S. Representative
