= Paul K. Charlton =

Former United States Attorney for Arizona

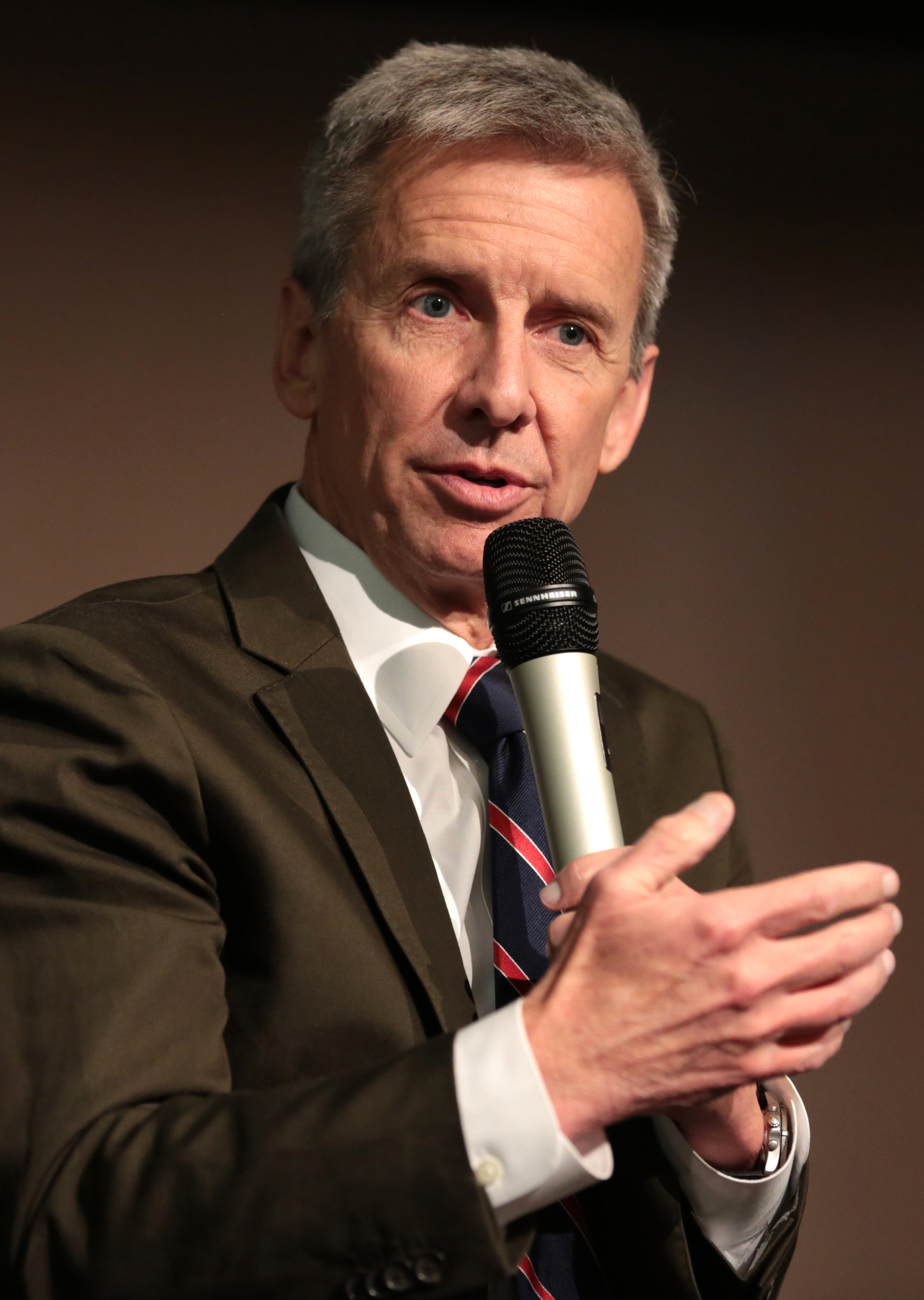
- Paul K. Charlton in April 2017

United States Attorney for the District of Arizona
- In office November 16, 2001 – December 7, 2006
- Appointed by: George W. Bush
- Preceded by: Jose de Jesus Rivera
- Succeeded by: Diane Humetewa

Personal details
- Education: University of Arizona (BA, JD)
- Profession: Attorney

Paul K. Charlton is a former United States Attorney and current partner at the law firm of Dentons US LLP in the firm's Phoenix, Arizona office. Charlton concentrates his practice on high-profile and complex litigation, internal investigations and white-collar criminal defense. Charlton also represents a number of Arizona Native American governments, including Ak-Chin, Salt River Pima-Maricopa, Haulapai, the Navajo Nation, and Tohono O'odham.

Prior to joining Dentons, he served as managing partner at law firm Steptoe & Johnson LLP. Charlton served as the United States Attorney for the District of Arizona from 2001 to 2007. He was nominated in November 2001 by President George W. Bush. He oversaw a staff of more than 220 employees, four offices throughout the state, and an approximately $20 million budget. During his tenure, Charlton led enforcement initiatives against terrorism, public corruption, illegal immigration and crime in Indian Country.

== Early career ==
Charlton began his legal career in 1989 as an Assistant Attorney General with the Arizona Attorney General's Office. In March 1991, Charlton joined the U.S. Attorney's Office in Arizona as an Assistant U.S. Attorney where he prosecuted a wide variety of matters from homicides to complex fraud cases.

== United States attorney ==
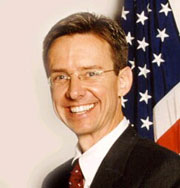
Paul K. Charlton as U.S. Attorney

Charlton was confirmed as the United States Attorney for the United States District Court for the District of Arizona on November 6, 2001.

In September 2006, it became clear that Charlton had launched an investigation of Rep. Rick Renzi (R-AZ), regarding a land-swap deal. Attorney General Alberto Gonzales's chief of staff, Kyle Sampson, subsequently included Charlton on a list of U.S. attorneys "we now should consider pushing out." Sampson made the comment in a September 13, 2006, letter to then-White House Counsel Harriet Miers.

Charlton was informed of his dismissal by Justice Department official Michael A. Battle on December 7, 2006, and announced his resignation on December 19, 2006, effective January 31, 2007. Overall, Charlton ranked number one in the nation for convictions in 2006.

On March 19, 2007, the White House released 3,000 pages of records connected to the controversy, including emails sent by Charlton to the Justice Department about his dismissal. On December 21, 2006, Charlton sent a message to William W. Mercer, the third-ranking official in the department, writing, "Media now asking if I was asked to resign over leak in Congressman Renzi investigation." Charlton never received a response.

The Wall Street Journal explained further allegations: that the Department of Justice intentionally delayed part of the investigation of Renzi until after the November 2006 election. They wrote:

The delays, which postponed key approvals in the case until after the election, raise new questions about whether Attorney General Alberto Gonzales or other officials may have weighed political issues in some investigations. ... Investigators pursuing the Renzi case had been seeking clearance from senior Justice Department officials on search warrants, subpoenas and other legal tools for a year before the election, people close to the case said. ... ... the investigation clearly moved slowly: Federal agents opened the case no later than June 2005, yet key witnesses didn't get subpoenas until early this year, those close to the case said. The first publicly known search -- a raid of a Renzi family business by the Federal Bureau of Investigation -- was[n't] carried out [until April 2007]. ...

Further, the Journal noted that investigators had lobbied Washington for clearance to tap Renzi's phone for months. That clearance was only given in October 2006, but unfortunately for the investigators, word broke of the investigation soon after, disrupting their wiretap.

On April 24, 2007, Charlton revealed to House investigators that Brian Murray, Renzi's top aide, called Charlton spokesman Wyn Hornbuckle shortly after news of Renzi's investigation became public, asking for information on the case. Charlton, in turn, notified the Department of Justice about the call. Justice, however, had not previously notified Congress of the contact.

A second motivation for removing Charlton may have been the suggestions of Justice official Brent Ward, who said in a September 20, 2006 e-mail that Charlton was "unwilling to take good cases." Ward's reason for discounting Charlton appeared to be the US attorney's reluctance to pursue obscenity charges against adult video manufacturers in connection to Attorney General Alberto Gonzales's Obscenity Prosecution Task Force.

After a disagreement over initiating the tape-recording of interviews and confessions by the FBI on American Indian reservations, which Charlton supported and the Justice Department opposed, Charlton offered to resign. In his congressional testimony on March 6, 2007, Charlton said he found "no small amount of irony" in the fact that he was eventually fired.

The Justice Department reversed its longstanding no-recording policy in May 2014, now requiring federal law enforcement agencies to tape-record interviews with suspects in most instances. Charlton was quoted,

The most difficult part of proving a crime is the state of mind, and that is almost always obtained through a statement of the suspect. It was an unjustifiable policy. I think this one of the most significant improvements in the criminal justice system in a long time.

Charlton had clashed with the Bush administration over the death penalty; in at least two cases he did not seek capital punishment but was overruled from Washington.

In its formal investigation regarding the firing of the US Attorneys, the Department of Justice's Office of Inspector General found as follows:

We concluded that the most significant factor in Charlton's removal was his actions in a death penalty case. Charlton persistently opposed the Department's decision to seek the death penalty in a homicide case, and he irritated Department leaders by seeking a meeting with the Attorney General to urge him to reconsider his decision. We are troubled that Department officials considered Charlton's actions in the death penalty case, including requesting a meeting with the Attorney General, to be inappropriate. We do not believe his actions were insubordinate or that they justified his removal.

Since leaving the U.S. Attorney's Office, Charlton was awarded Arizona's State Bar Criminal Justice Award, the University of Arizona Alumni Association Public Service Award and the Phoenix Business Journal's Most Admired Leaders Award.

Charlton's office had been honored with the Federal Service Award and hailed by the Justice Department as a "model program" for its protection of crime victims. Charlton ranked in the top third among the nation's 93 US attorneys in contributing to an overall 106,188 federal prosecutions filed in 2006; scored in the top third in number of convictions; oversaw a district in the top five highest in number of immigration-related prosecutions; ranked among the top 20 offices for drug prosecutions; and, unlike in the other seven cases, ranked high in weapons cases, prosecuting 199 of the United States' 9,313 such cases in 2006, the tenth-highest in the country and up fourfold from 2002.

== See also ==
- Dismissal of U.S. attorneys controversy
- Alberto Gonzales
- Kyle Sampson
- Rick Renzi
