= Todd Graves (attorney) =

American lawyer

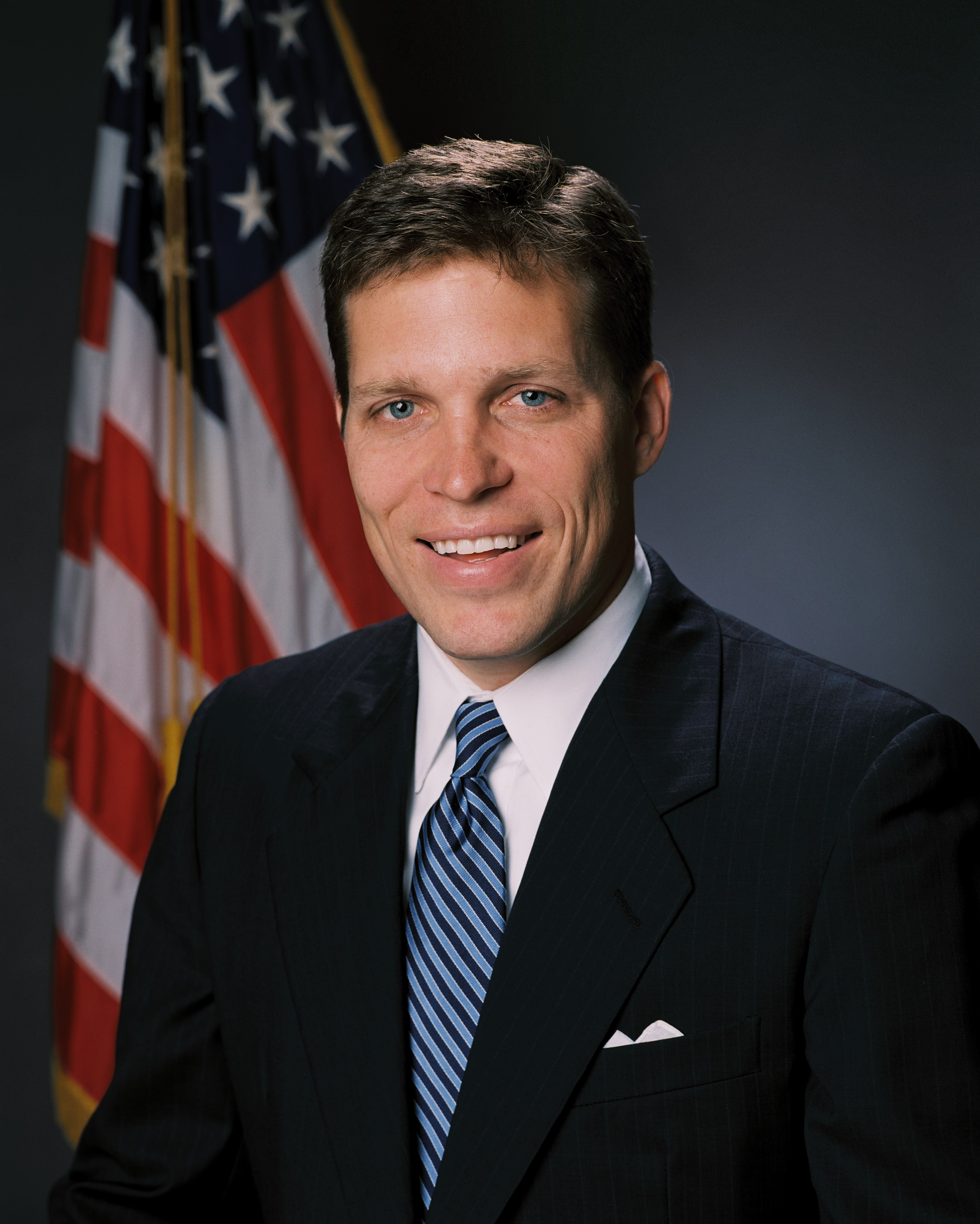

Chair of the Missouri Republican Party
- In office January 7, 2017 – January 26, 2019
- Preceded by: John Hancock
- Succeeded by: Kay Hoflander

United States Attorney for the Western District of Missouri
- In office September 17, 2001 – March 24, 2006; Acting: September 17, 2001 – October 11, 2001
- President: George W. Bush
- Preceded by: Stephen Hill
- Succeeded by: Bradley Schlozman (Acting)

Personal details
- Born: 1964 or 1965 (age 61) Tarkio, Missouri, U.S.
- Party: Republican
- Spouse: Tracy
- Children: 4
- Relatives: Sam Graves (Brother)
- Education: University of Missouri, Columbia (BS); University of Virginia, Charlottesville (MPA, JD)

Todd P. Graves (born 1965 or 1966) is a private practice attorney and Republican politician, who previously served as United States Attorney for the Western District of Missouri. A twice-elected state prosecutor who is currently in private practice with the law firm Graves Garrett LLC, his practice focuses on representing individuals and businesses nationwide before federal and state courts and administrative agencies. Graves was born and raised in Tarkio, Missouri. His brother is U.S. Representative Sam Graves. On January 7, 2017, Graves was elected with unanimous support by the Missouri Republican State Committee to serve as Chairman of the Missouri Republican Party.

== Early life and career ==
Graves was born in 1965 or 1966. He was raised on a farm. He was diagnosed with cancer at the age of 21 and underwent surgery. Graves received an undergraduate degree in agricultural economics, with a minor in political science, from the University of Missouri, and a Juris Doctor degree and a master's degree in public administration from the University of Virginia in 1991.

Right out of law school, Graves was employed as an Assistant Attorney General for the State of Missouri, and served that year as a staff assistant on the Governor's Commission on Crime. From 1992–1994, Graves was in private practice with the law firm of Bryan Cave. In 1994, he was elected as Platte County Prosecuting Attorney (at the time, he was the youngest full-time prosecuting attorney in Missouri), and re-elected in 1998, an office that he held until his U.S. Attorney appointment. Graves ran for State Treasurer of Missouri in 2000, but lost the general election to Nancy Farmer.

== U.S. Attorney ==
Graves took his oath of office on September 17, 2001, as an interim United States attorney appointed by the U.S. District Court. His appointment was approved by President George W. Bush and confirmed by the United States Senate on October 11, 2001.

== Dismissal of U.S. attorneys controversy ==
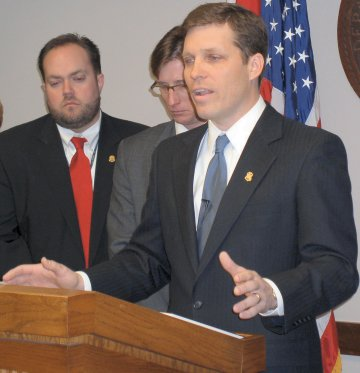
Graves resigns as US Attorney

In January 2006, Graves was asked to step down from his job by Michael A. Battle (R), then director of the Justice department's Executive Office for U.S. Attorneys. This was not made public. Graves had clashed with the Department of Justice's civil rights division over a federal lawsuit involving Missouri's voter rolls. The department was pushing for a lawsuit against Missouri, accusing the state of failing to eliminate ineligible people from voter rolls. Graves refused to sign off on the lawsuit, which was subsequently authorized by Graves' successor, Bradley Schlozman (R). In April 2007, a federal judge dismissed the lawsuit. Graves publicly revealed that he had been asked to resign in May 2007.

In October 2008, U.S. Senator (R-MO) Kit Bond apologized to Graves, after a U.S. Justice Department report cited Bond forcing Graves out over a disagreement with Representative Sam Graves (R). Following the report, Attorney General Michael Mukasey appointed a special prosecutor to investigate whether former Attorney General Alberto Gonzales (R) and other officials involved in the firings of nine U.S. attorneys broke the law. Citizens for Responsibility and Ethics in Washington filed an Ethics Committee complaint against Bond over his role in ousting Graves.

After resigning from his position as U.S. attorney, Graves formed the law firm of Graves Bartle & Marcus, LLC, which has evolved into the firm Graves Garrett LLC and is based in Kansas City, Missouri.

== Subsequent career ==
Graves was unanimously elected to a two-year term as chairman of the Missouri Republican Party in January 2017. His firm is the registered agent of Cornerstone 1791 and Liberty Alliance USA, an organization described by its executive director, Chris Vas, as "formed in order to grow the conservative movement in Missouri now and for decades to come."

Graves serves as President of the Board to the Stanley M. Herzog Foundation, which supports the advancement of Christian education through an endowment of nearly half a billion dollars. The foundation's stated mission is to support education that instills values like commitment to God, family, and community. The foundation is headquartered in Smithville, Missouri at their 18,000 square foot training and office facility completed in the summer of 2022.

On March 18, 2021, Governor Mike Parson nominated Graves to serve on the University of Missouri Board of Curators from the 6th congressional district. On April 7, 2021, Graves was confirmed to the board. His term will end on January 1, 2027.

== Personal life ==
As of 2017, Graves operates a cattle ranching business near Smithville, Missouri. As of 2007, he is married and has four children. He has a brother, Sam, a politician.

== Sources ==
- Talev, Margaret; Ron Hutcheson and Marisa Taylor (2007-04-27). Administration considered firing 12 U.S. attorneys but cut list down", realcities.com; accessed April 24, 2015.
- David Stout (May 10, 2007). "House "Democrats Raise New Criticism of Gonzales", The New York Times; retrieved May 10, 2007.

Legal offices
Preceded by Stephen Hill	United States Attorney for the Western District of Missouri; 2001–2006	Succeeded by Bradley Schlozman (Acting)
Party political offices
Preceded by Carl Bearden	Republican nominee for State Treasurer of Missouri; 2000	Succeeded by Sarah Steelman
Preceded by John Hancock	Chair of the Missouri Republican Party; 2017–2019	Succeeded by Kay Hoflander
