= David Iglesias =

Panamanian and American lawyer

David C. Iglesias
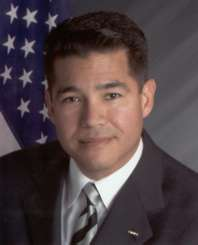

United States Attorney for the District of New Mexico
- In office October 18, 2001 – December 19, 2006
- President: George W. Bush
- Preceded by: Norman Bay
- Succeeded by: Larry Gomez

Personal details
- Born: David Claudio Iglesias; 1958 (age 67–68) Panama City, Panama
- Party: Republican
- Spouse: Cynthia Iglesias
- Children: 4
- Education: Wheaton College; University of New Mexico
- Occupation: Attorney

Military service
- Allegiance: United States
- Branch/service: United States Navy
- Years of service: 1985–2014
- Rank: Captain
- Awards: Defense Meritorious Service Medal; Meritorious Service Medal; Navy Achievement Medal; Joint Service Commendation Medal; Navy Commendation Medal
- Meritorious Service Medal

David Claudio Iglesias (born 1958) is a Panamanian-American attorney from Albuquerque, New Mexico.

Iglesias serves as the director of the Wheaton Center for Faith, Politics and Economics in Illinois. He is also the Jean and E. Floyd Kvamme Associate Professor of Politics and Law. In April 2014, Iglesias retired from the U.S. Naval Reserve Judge Advocate General's Corps (JAG) after 30 years of active and reserve service.

He was appointed by President George W. Bush as the United States Attorney for the District of New Mexico in August 2001 and confirmed by the U.S. Senate in October 2001. He was one of eight U.S. attorneys fired by the Bush administration in 2006 for "performance-related issues." (see Dismissal of U.S. attorneys controversy). A review of the matter released by the U.S. Department of Justice Inspector General in October 2008 found that his firing had not been performance-related but was politically motivated.

In October 2008, Iglesias was re-activated by the Navy as part of a special prosecution team for Guantanamo detainees suspected of committing terrorism and war crimes. He supervised the conviction of the U.S. v. Noor Uthman terrorism case; one of only six completed war crimes cases since the Commissions were re-established. In 2009, Iglesias was named as an honoree to Esquire magazine's annual "Best and Brightest" issue for his work as a terrorism prosecutor with the Defense Department's Office of Military Commissions.

== Early life ==
Iglesias was born in Panama City, Panama to Southern Baptist missionaries; his mother, Margaret Geiger (1923-2012), was a German-American, and his father, Claudio Iglesias (1923-2008), was a Guna-Panamanian. His mother and father raised him on a small island off the coast of Panama where they were building a church, and doing medical, dental, and linguistic work with the Guna language (creating the Guna alphabet). After Panama, his family moved first to Newkirk, Oklahoma (1964-1970), then to Gallup, New Mexico, then back to Panama for one year. Moving again, he graduated from Santa Fe High School, in Santa Fe, New Mexico (1976). He obtained a Bachelor of Arts degree from Wheaton College in Wheaton, Illinois (1980), and a Juris Doctor from the University of New Mexico School of Law (1984).

Iglesias served in the United States Navy and later in the U.S. Naval Reserve. He was a Judge Advocate (JAG), at the Pentagon and Naval Legal Service Office, in Washington, D.C., at the Washington Navy Yard (1985-1988). In 1986, he was one of the members of the legal team that was the inspiration for the film A Few Good Men, with Tom Cruise and Jack Nicholson, a case involving the assault of a fellow Marine at their base in Guantanamo Bay, Cuba.

== Politics ==
A political independent during his college years, he became a Republican while in the Navy. Iglesias in an interview with Tavis Smiley, said that he was for: "smaller government, less taxes, personal responsibility, and government restraint." He added, "Only problem is, our leaders haven't been practicing that. We've outspent the Democrats for the past eight years. So there's a difference between the ideals, which I love, and the actual application, which I don't love."

In 1995 he was competitively chosen to be a White House Fellow, and served as a Special Assistant to the Secretary of Transportation. He ran for New Mexico Attorney General as a Republican in 1998, but narrowly lost to Democrat Patricia A. Madrid.

== Political career ==
Iglesias was a state Assistant Attorney General (Special Prosecutions; focusing on white collar fraud cases) for the state of New Mexico (1988-1991), then an assistant city attorney for the city of Albuquerque (1991-1993). He returned to employment with the state of New Mexico, first for the State Risk Management Legal Office as Chief Counsel (1995-1998), and the Taxation and Revenue Department as General Counsel (1998-2001).

He was an associate with the law firm of Walz and Associates in Albuquerque when he was nominated as US Attorney for the District of New Mexico in August 2001. Iglesias headed a panel that advised the U.S. Attorney General John Ashcroft on border and immigration matters. While serving on the panel, he opposed pulling the National Guard away from the U.S. border with Mexico.

== Dismissal of U.S. attorneys controversy ==
In 2005 Allen Weh, chairman of the New Mexico Republican Party, complained about U.S. Attorney Iglesias to a White House aide for Karl Rove, asking that Iglesias be removed. Weh was dissatisfied with Iglesias due in part to his failure to indict New Mexico State Senator Manny Aragon (D) on fraud and conspiracy charges. Then in 2006 Rove personally told Weh "He's gone." Weh followed up with, "There's nothing we've done that's wrong. It wasn't that Iglesias wasn't looking out for Republicans. He just wasn't doing his job, period." Three weeks after Iglesias was dismissed, his replacement brought a 26 count felony indictment against Aragon. In a plea bargain, Aragon pleaded guilty to three felony fraud counts.

Iglesias testified before Congress in March 2007, stating that Senator Pete Domenici (R-N.M.) and Representative Heather Wilson (R-N.M.) called and urged him to rush indictments against Aragon prior to the November 2006 election. In October 2006, when Domenici called to ask about the progress of an investigation, New Mexico U.S. Iglesias said he felt this inquiry was trying to "pressure" him to speed up indictments in a federal corruption investigation that involved Aragon. When Iglesias said he didn't think an indictment would be issued before November, "the line went dead." Earlier in October, Rep. Wilson also called about the indictments in the same investigation. One month after the election, Iglesias was fired by the Bush administration, and his firing was central to the dismissal of U.S. Attorneys controversy. Larry Gomez, who had been Iglesias' assistant, took over as acting U.S. Attorney, but never received a presidential appointment to the post.

One of the stated reasons for Iglesias' dismissal was dissatisfaction in his prosecution of voter-fraud cases. Nevertheless, Iglesias "had been heralded for his expertise in that area by the Justice Department, which twice selected him to train other federal prosecutors to pursue election crimes" and was "one of two chief federal prosecutors invited to teach at a 'voting integrity symposium' in October 2005… sponsored by Justice's public integrity and civil rights sections." The Justice Department said that part of the reason for Iglesias's dismissal was because of his frequent absences. In response to this charge, Iglesias stated that the reason for these absences was his mandatory service as part of the Naval Reserve. That would have constituted a possible violation of the Uniformed Services Employment and Reemployment Act (USERRA).

== Dismissal aftermath ==
In 2008 Iglesias wrote (with contributor Davin Seay) In Justice: Inside the Scandal That Rocked the Bush Administration.

On The Daily Show first broadcast on June 16, 2008, Iglesias was asked about his political ideology. Host Jon Stewart pointed out that Iglesias had been a committed Republican. Stewart asked whether Iglesias' experiences made him feel disappointed and betrayed. Iglesias replied, "Yes, and to use a Star Wars kind of imagery, I thought I was working with the Jedi Knights, and I was working for the Sith Lords."

In October 2008, a report by the Department of Justice's Inspector General found that Iglesias had been wrongfully dismissed because he had refused to pursue prosecutions against the Democrat-linked community organization ACORN and a prominent New Mexico Democrat. "The real reasons for Iglesias' removal were the complaints from New Mexico Republican politicians and party activists about how Iglesias handled voter fraud and public corruption cases in the state," the report says. The Inspector General's report says that Senator Domenici's complaints were the "primary" reason Iglesias was fired.

In July 2010, Department of Justice prosecutors closed the two-year investigation without filing charges after determining that the firing was inappropriately political, but not criminal, saying "Evidence did not demonstrate that any prosecutable criminal offense was committed with regard to the removal of David Iglesias. The investigative team also determined that the evidence did not warrant expanding the scope of the investigation beyond the removal of Iglesias."

== Personal life ==
Iglesias reviews Native American films, both fictional and documentary, and has written feature length articles for Native Peoples Magazine since 1992. In 2002, he contributed an article to Native Peoples, called "Brothers in Arms: Windtalkers".

Iglesias lives with his wife, Cynthia, and has four daughters. He is a practicing Evangelical Christian.

Legal offices
Preceded by Norman Bay	United States Attorney; District of New Mexico; 2002–2006	Succeeded by Larry Gomez
