= Alberto Gonzales =

American lawyer (born 1955)

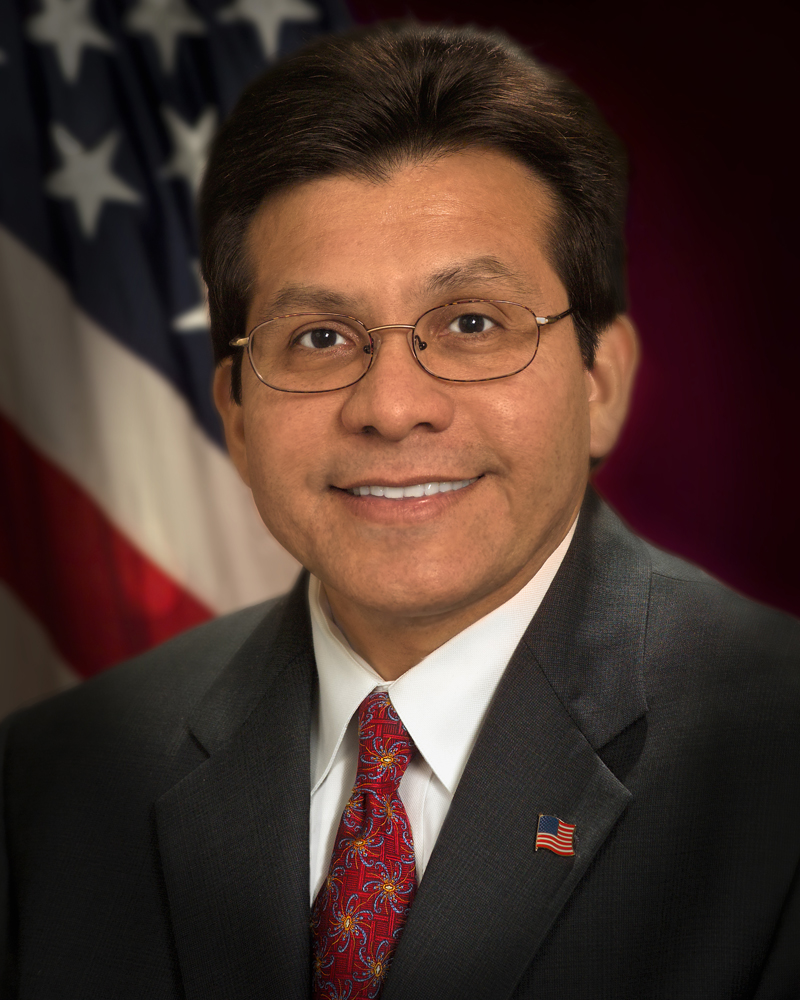
- Official portrait, 2005

80th United States Attorney General
- In office February 3, 2005 – September 17, 2007
- President: George W. Bush
- Deputy: James Comey; Robert McCallum Jr. (acting); Paul McNulty; Craig S. Morford (acting)
- Preceded by: John Ashcroft
- Succeeded by: Michael Mukasey

White House Counsel
- In office January 20, 2001 – February 3, 2005
- President: George W. Bush
- Preceded by: Beth Nolan
- Succeeded by: Harriet Miers

Associate Justice of the Texas Supreme Court
- In office January 3, 1999 – January 20, 2001
- Appointed by: George W. Bush
- Preceded by: Raul Gonzalez
- Succeeded by: Wallace B. Jefferson

100th Secretary of State of Texas
- In office January 1, 1998 – January 3, 1999
- Governor: George W. Bush
- Preceded by: Tony Garza
- Succeeded by: Elton Bomer

Personal details
- Born: Alberto Reynaldo Gonzales; August 4, 1955 (age 71) San Antonio, Texas, U.S.
- Party: Republican
- Spouse(s): Diana Clemens (div. 1985) Rebecca Turner
- Children: 3
- Education: United States Air Force Academy (attended); Rice University (BA); Harvard University (JD)

Military service
- Allegiance: United States
- Branch/service: United States Air Force
- Years of service: 1973–1975
- Gonzales's voice Gonzales testifying before the Senate Judiciary Committee on antiterrorism efforts and Justice Department authority. Recorded July 18, 2006

Alberto Reynaldo Gonzales (born August 4, 1955) is an American lawyer who served as the 80th United States attorney general from 2005 to 2007. He was the highest-ranking Hispanic American in the executive government in American history until the appointment of Marco Rubio as Secretary of State in 2025. He previously served as Secretary of State of Texas, as a Texas Supreme Court Justice, and as White House Counsel, becoming the first Hispanic to hold that office.

Gonzales's tenure as U.S. Attorney General was marked by controversy regarding warrantless surveillance of U.S. citizens and the legal authorization of "enhanced interrogation techniques", later generally acknowledged as constituting torture, in the U.S. government's post-9/11 "war on terror". Gonzales had also presided over the controversial firings of several U.S. Attorneys, resulting in allegations that the office of Attorney General was becoming improperly politicized. Following calls for his removal, Gonzales resigned from the office "in the best interests of the department", on August 27, 2007, effective September 17, 2007.

In 2008, Gonzales began a mediation and consulting practice. Additionally, he taught a political science course and served as a diversity recruiter at Texas Tech University. As of 2024, Gonzales is the dean of Belmont University College of Law in Nashville, Tennessee, where he teaches National Security Law. He was formerly Of Counsel at a Nashville-based law firm, Waller Lansden Dortch & Davis, LLP, where he advised clients on special matters, government investigations and regulatory matters.

== Early life and education ==
Gonzales was born in San Antonio, Texas, to a Catholic family, and raised in Humble, Texas, a town outside of Houston. Of Mexican descent, he was the second of eight children born to Maria (Rodriguez) and Pablo M. Gonzales. His father, who died in 1982, was a migrant worker and then a construction worker with a second grade education. His mother worked at home raising eight children and had a sixth grade education. Gonzales and his family of ten lived in a small, two-bedroom home built by his father and uncles with no telephone and no hot running water. According to Gonzales, he is unaware whether immigration documentation exists for three of his grandparents who were born in Mexico and may have entered and resided in the United States illegally.

An honors student at MacArthur High School in unincorporated Harris County, Gonzales enlisted in the United States Air Force in 1973, for a four-year term of enlistment. He served one year at a remote radar site with 100 other GIs at Fort Yukon, Alaska. He was then released from active duty to attend the USAFA Prep School after which he received an appointment to the United States Air Force Academy. Prior to beginning his third year at the academy, which would have caused him to incur a further service obligation, he left the academy and was released from the enlistment contract. He transferred to Rice University in Houston, where he was a resident of Lovett College. He went on to be selected as the Charles Parkhill Scholar of Political Science and was awarded a bachelor's degree with honors in political science in 1979. He then earned a Juris Doctor (J.D.) degree from Harvard Law School in 1982.

== Personal life ==
Gonzales has been married twice: he and his first wife, Diane Clemens, divorced in 1985; he and his second wife, Rebecca Turner Gonzales, have three sons.

== Early career ==
Gonzales was an attorney in private practice from 1982 until 1994 with the Houston law firm Vinson and Elkins, where he became a partner—one of the first Hispanic partners in its history—and where he worked primarily with corporate clients. In 1994, he was named general counsel to then–Texas Governor George W. Bush, rising to become Secretary of State of Texas in 1997 and named to the Texas Supreme Court in 1999, both appointments made by Governor Bush. Gonzales won his election bid to remain on the court in the Republican primary in 2000, and was elected to a full six-year term on the State Supreme Court in the November 2000 general election.

== Recognition ==
Gonzales has been active in the community, serving as board director or committee member for several non-profit organizations between 1985 and 1994.

In the legal sphere Gonzales provided pro bono legal services to the Host Committee for the 1992 Republican National Convention in Houston, acted as a board director for the State Bar of Texas from 1991 to 1994, and was board trustee of the Texas Bar Foundation from 1996 to 1999. He has received numerous professional awards, including the Presidential Citation from the State Bar of Texas in 1997 in claimed recognition of his dedication to addressing basic legal needs of the indigent. In 1999, he was named Latino Lawyer of the Year by the Hispanic National Bar Association.

Between 2002 and 2003, Gonzales was recognized as a Distinguished Alumnus of Rice University and received the Harvard Law School Association Award, John Ben Shepperd Public Leadership Institute Outstanding Texas Leader Award, United States Hispanic Chamber of Commerce President's Award, League of United Latin American Citizens President's Award, the Gary L. McPherson Distinguished Alumni Award from the American Council of Young Political Leaders, the Chairman's Leadership Award from the Texas Association of Mexican American Chamber of Commerce, the Hispanic Scholarship Fund's Truinfador Award, the Hispanic Hero Award from the Association for the Advancement of Mexican Americans, the Good Neighbor Award from the United States–Mexican Chamber of Commerce, and the Lifetime Achievement Award from the Travis County, Texas Republican Party. In 2004, Gonzales was given the Exemplary Leader Award by the Houston American Leadership Forum. In 2005 he was given the Hector Barreto, Sr. Award by the Latino Coalition and a President's Award by the U.S. Hispanic Chamber of Commerce.

As the son of former migrant workers, many believed Gonzales's appointment as Attorney General of the United States to be an example of the American dream. He was named Hispanic American of the Year by Hispanic magazine in 2005 and one of the 25 Most Influential Hispanics in America by Time magazine. Gonzales was inducted into the Class of 2005 in the American Academy of Achievement. Gonzales received the Distinguished Leadership Award in 2006 from Leadership Houston. In 2007, as he left government service, he was given the Director's Award from the Central Intelligence Agency, and the Office of the Secretary of Defense Medal for Exceptional Public Service.

On May 20, 2006, Houston Mayor Bill White proclaimed "Alberto R. Gonzales Day" in Houston in recognition of what was believed to be his contributions to the betterment of the City of Houston. Academic institutions have also recognized Gonzales's achievements. He received an Honorary Doctor of Laws in 2002 from The Catholic University of America; an Honorary Degree in Arts and Letters in 2003 from Miami-Dade Community College; an Honorary Degree of Doctor of Laws in 2005 from the University of the District of Columbia; an Honorary Degree in Associate of Arts in 2005 from the Houston Community College System; and an Honorary Alumnus Award in 2007 from Southern Methodist University.

== Counsel to Governor Bush ==
As counsel to Governor Bush, Gonzales helped advise Bush in connection with jury duty when he was called in a 1996 Travis County drunk driving case. The case led to controversy during Bush's 2000 presidential campaign because Bush's answers to the potential juror questionnaire did not disclose Bush's own 1976 misdemeanor drunk driving conviction. Gonzales made no formal request for Bush to be excused from jury duty but raised a possible conflict of interest because as the Governor, Bush might be called upon to pardon the accused party. Gonzales's work in this case has been described as "canny lawyering".

As Governor Bush's counsel in Texas, Gonzales also reviewed all clemency requests. A 2003 article in The Atlantic Monthly asserted that Gonzales gave insufficient counsel, and failed to second-guess convictions and failed appeals. Gonzales's deputy general counsel from 1995 to 1999, Pete Wassdorf, in turn sought to defend Gonzales from what he characterized as an inaccurate and incomplete picture of the clemency process under Bush. Under Section II, Article 4 of the Texas Constitution, the Governor cannot grant a pardon or commute a death sentence except with a majority vote recommendation of the Texas Board of Pardons and Paroles, so Bush was constrained in granting clemency even if he had wanted to do so in a case. The fact remains that only one death sentence was overturned by Governor Bush, and the state of Texas executed more prisoners during Gonzales's term than any other state.

== White House Counsel ==
As White House counsel, and later as attorney general, Gonzales served president George W. Bush through a period of escalating controversy over the legality of U.S. policies in the fight against terrorism. Gonzales approved the legal framework for the administration's anti-terrorism efforts and was a reliable advocate for White House policy. He supported positions that enlarged the power of the executive and diminished protections for interrogation subjects. These rulings were vocally challenged by many scholars and human-rights advocates and were partly overturned by the courts. He resigned following sharp criticism of his handling of the firing of nine U.S. attorneys and subsequent testimony during congressional hearings.

=== Support for use of torture ===
Gonzalez was a supporter of the Bush administration's policy of torture of detainees, internally referred to as "Enhanced interrogation techniques".

In January 2002, Gonzales authored a memo that explored whether the Geneva Convention section III on the Treatment of Prisoners of War (GPW) applied to Al-Qaeda and Taliban fighters captured in Afghanistan and held in detention facilities around the world, including Camp X-Ray in Guantánamo Bay, Cuba. The memo made several arguments both for and against providing GPW protection to al-Qaeda and Taliban fighters. The memo concluded that certain provisions of GPW were outdated and ill-suited for dealing with captured Al-Qaeda and Taliban fighters: "[The war against terrorism] is not the traditional clash between nations adhering to the laws of war that formed the backdrop for GPW. The nature of the new war places a high premium on other factors, such as the ability to quickly obtain information from captured terrorists and their sponsors in order to avoid further atrocities against American civilians, and the need to try terrorists for war crimes such as wantonly killing civilians."

Gonzales later explained, "The old ways may not work here. That's what the memo was intended to convey to the President. I never meant to convey to the President that the basic values in the Geneva Convention were outdated." He noted that a British parliamentary committee visiting Guantánamo, while horrified by conditions at the base, had reached a similar conclusion when it said, "the Geneva Conventions are failing to provide necessary protection because they lack clarity and are out of date". He argued that existing military regulations and instructions from the President were more than adequate to ensure that the principles of the Geneva Convention would be applied. He also expressed a concern that undefined language in Common Article III of GPW, such as "outrages upon personal dignity" and "inhuman treatment" could make officials and military leaders subject to the War Crimes Act of 1996 if actions were deemed to constitute violations of the Act. Attorney General John Ashcroft made a similar argument on behalf of the Justice Department by letter to the President dated February 1, 2002, writing that a presidential determination "against treaty application would provide the highest assurance that no court would subsequently entertain charges that American military officers, intelligence officials or law enforcement officials violated Geneva Convention rules relating to field conduct, detention conduct or interrogation of detainees. The War Crimes Act of 1996 makes violations of parts of the Geneva Convention a crime in the United States."

Gonzalez oversaw President Bush's Office of Legal Counsel on August 1, 2002, at which time the OLC produced the Bybee memo, a document that provided the legal framework by which previous interpretations of the Geneva Convention and the United Nations Convention Against Torture were modified to expand Presidential authority to enable so-called "enhanced interrogation techniques".

The memo was produced in response to a specific CIA request for clarification of the standards of interrogation under U.S. law, in the specific case of Abu Zabaydah, a man believed at the time to be a high-level al-Qaeda leader. In response, the Justice Department issued a classified August 1, 2002, memo to the CIA from Jay Bybee, the Assistant Attorney General for the Office of Legal Counsel, and an August 1, 2002, legal opinion to Gonzales from Jay Bybee defining torture as an act specifically intended to inflict severe physical or mental pain or suffering.

Journalists including Jane Mayer, Joby Warrick and Peter Finn, and Alex Koppelman have reported the CIA was already using these harsh tactics before the memo authorizing their use was written, and that it was used to provide after-the-fact legal support for harsh interrogation techniques. A Department of Justice 2009 report regarding prisoner abuses reportedly stated the memos were prepared one month after Abu Zubaydah had already been subjected to the specific techniques authorized in the August 1, 2002, memo. John Kiriakou stated in July 2009 that Abu Zubaydah was waterboarded in the early summer of 2002, months before the August 1, 2002, memo was written.

The memo described ten techniques that the interrogators wanted to use: "(1) attention grasp, (2) walling, (3) facial hold, (4) facial slap (insult slap), (5) cramped confinement, (6) wall standing, (7) stress positions, (8) sleep deprivation, (9) insects placed in a confinement box, and (10) the waterboard." Many of the techniques were, until then, generally considered illegal. Many other techniques developed by the CIA were held to constitute inhumane and degrading treatment and torture under the United Nations Convention against Torture and Article 3 of the European Convention on Human Rights. As reported later, many of these interrogation techniques were previously considered illegal under U.S. and international law and treaties at the time of Abu Zubaydah's capture. For instance, the United States had prosecuted Japanese military officials after World War II and American soldiers after the Vietnam War for waterboarding. Since 1930, the United States had defined sleep deprivation as an illegal form of torture. Many other techniques developed by the CIA constitute inhuman and degrading treatment and torture under the United Nations Convention against Torture, and Article 3 of the European Convention on Human Rights.

In May 2005, three months after Gonzales became attorney general, Steven G. Bradbury of the Office of Legal Counsel issued a pair of classified opinions that, for the first time, provided Central Intelligence Agency explicit authorization to apply to terror suspects a variety of painful physical and psychological interrogation methods, either alone or in combination. The approved techniques included striking a prisoner, exposure to extreme temperatures, stress positions, walling, sleep deprivation for up to 180 hours (7 1/2 days), and the simulated drowning procedure known as "waterboarding". These secret memos superseded a previous, unclassified legal opinion that declared torture "abhorrent." Nevertheless, the classified opinions claimed that their reasoning and conclusions were based upon and fully consistent with the previous legal opinion. Gonzales reportedly approved the May 10, 2005, classified legal memoranda over the policy objections of James B. Comey, the outgoing deputy attorney general, who told colleagues at the Justice Department that they would all be "ashamed" when the world eventually learned of it. Patrick Leahy and John Conyers, chairmen of the respective Senate and House Judiciary Committees, requested that the Justice Department turn over documents related to the classified 2005 legal opinions to their committees for review.

In 2009, The Obama administration stated it would abide by the Geneva Convention and described some of the enhanced interrogation techniques established under Attorney General Gonzales's tenure as torture. On January 22, 2009, President Obama signed an executive order requiring the CIA to use only the 19 interrogation methods outlined in the United States Army Field Manual on interrogations "unless the Attorney General with appropriate consultation provides further guidance." Bradbury's memoranda were publicly released by the Obama Administration on April 16, 2009.

=== Objectivity ===
Gonzales had a long relationship with former president George W. Bush. Gonzales served as a general counsel when Bush was the governor of Texas. Such relationship made critics question whether he would maintain independence in his administration of the U.S. Department of Justice. Gonzales has been called Bush's "yes man." Even though the advice given by Gonzales was based and supported by other lawyers, specifically the Department of Justice, charged by statute to provide legal advice to the President, critics claim that Gonzales gave only the legal advice Bush wanted. Critics questioned Gonzales's ethics and professional conduct.

"To his backers, Gonzales is a quiet, hardworking attorney general notable for his open management style and his commitment to the administration of justice and to the war on terrorism."

One publication reported, "Gonzales contends that his friendship with Bush makes him a better advocate for the rule of law within the executive branch." My responsibilities is to ensure that the laws are enforced, that everyone in the country receives justice under the law—independent of my relationship with the White House, independent of my relationship with the President of the United States," he told National Journal. Another report states that Gonzales has "a long history of dogged obedience to the President, which often has come at the cost of institutional independence and adherence to the rule of law."

=== Executive Order 13233 ===
Executive Order 13233, drafted by Gonzales and issued by President George W. Bush on November 1, 2001, shortly after the September 11, 2001 attacks, attempted to place limitations on the Freedom of Information Act by restricting access to the records of former presidents. The order asserted the President's power to delay the release of presidential records longer than the congressionally mandated period of 12 years after the president leaves office. Executive Order 13233 revoked President Ronald Reagan's Executive Order 12667 on the same subject and had the effect of delaying the release of Reagan's papers, which were due to be made public when Bush took office in 2001. While the policy was being drawn up, Gonzales as Counsel to the President issued a series of orders to the U.S. Archivist to delay the release of Reagan's records. This order was the subject of a number of lawsuits and Congressional attempts to overturn it. In 2007, a D.C. district court ordered the Archivist not to obey this order, finding it to be "arbitrary, capricious, and contrary to law in violation of the Administrative Procedure Act." On January 21, 2009 (his first day in office), President Barack Obama revoked Executive Order 13233 by issuing Executive Order 13489, with wording largely matching Reagan's Executive Order 12667.

=== Energy Task Force secrecy ===
Gonzales fought with Congress to keep Vice President Dick Cheney's Energy Task Force documents from being reviewed. His arguments were ultimately upheld by courts. On July 2, 2004, the Supreme Court ruled in favor of the Vice President, but remanded the case back to the D.C. Circuit. On May 11, 2005, the D.C. Circuit threw out the lawsuit and ruled the Vice President was free to meet in private with energy industry representatives in 2001 while drawing up the President's energy policy.

== Attorney general ==
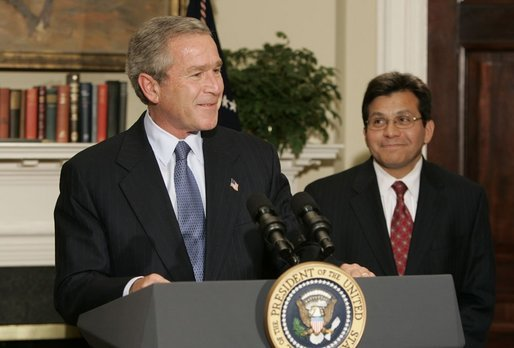
U.S. President George W. Bush announces his nomination of Gonzales to succeed Ashcroft as the next Attorney General during a press conference in the Roosevelt Room Wednesday, November 10, 2004.

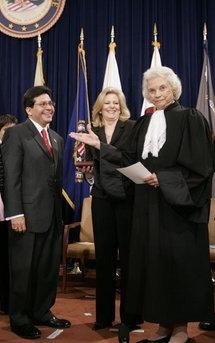
Justice Sandra Day O'Connor presents Gonzales to the audience after swearing him in as Attorney General, as Mrs. Gonzales looks on.

Gonzales's name was sometimes floated as a possible nominee to the United States Supreme Court during Bush's first presidential term. On November 10, 2004, it was announced that he would be nominated to replace United States Attorney General John Ashcroft for Bush's second term. Gonzales was regarded as a moderate compared to Ashcroft because he was not seen as opposing abortion or affirmative action. Although he has never stated publicly his support for abortion and later as attorney general, was the plaintiff in the Supreme Court case Gonzales v. Carhart, which reinforced the ban on late-term abortion that was previously overturned, and had stated publicly his opposition to racial quotas, some people assumed Gonzales did not oppose abortion or affirmative action. According to a Texas Monthly article, Gonzales has never said he was pro-choice and he has publicly opposed racial quotas.

The perceived departure from some conservative viewpoints elicited strong opposition to Gonzales that started during his Senate confirmation proceedings at the beginning of President Bush's second term. The New York Times quoted anonymous Republican officials as saying that Gonzales's appointment to attorney general was a way to "bolster Mr. Gonzales's credentials" en route to a later Supreme Court appointment.

Gonzales enjoyed broad bipartisan support in connection with his nomination, including the support of former Democratic HUD Secretary Henry Cisneros and Colorado Democratic Senator Ken Salazar. Writer Lisa Tucker McElroy noted that a senator from Pennsylvania told her, "I have always found him [Alberto Gonzales] to be completely forthright, brutally honest—in some cases telling me things I did not want to hear but always forthright, always honest, sincere, serious. This is a serious man who takes the responsibilities that have been given to him as a great privilege and a great honor which he holds very carefully and gently in his hands," and another from Kentucky said, "Judge Gonzales is proof that in America, there are no artificial barriers to success. A man or woman can climb to any height that his or her talents can take them. For Judge Gonzales, that is a very high altitude indeed. And luckily for his country, he is not quite finished climbing yet." The nomination was approved on February 3, 2005, with the confirming vote largely split along party lines 60–36 (54 Republicans and six Democrats in favor, and 36 Democrats against, along with four abstentions: three Democrats and one Republicans). He was sworn in on February 3, 2005.

=== Right to writ of habeas corpus in the U.S. Constitution ===
Gonzales helped draft the January 2002 Presidential Order that authorized the use of military tribunals to try terrorist suspects. The order provided the President the power to hold any non-citizen who he deemed a terrorist, or accessory to a terrorist, in military detention and subject to trial before a military commission. Subsequently the United States Department of Defense (DOD) organized military tribunals to judge charges against enemy combatant detainees being held at Guantanamo Bay detention camp. In the early years, the camp authorities did not allow foreign detainees access to attorneys, or materials supporting their charges, and the executive branch declared them outside the reach of due process under habeas corpus. In Rasul v. Bush (2004), the US Supreme Court ruled that they did have rights to habeas corpus and had to be provided access to legal counsel and an opportunity to challenge their detention before an impartial tribunal. Further, in 2006, the Supreme Court ruled in Hamdan v. Rumsfeld that trying Guantanamo Bay detainees under the existing Guantanamo military commission (known also as Military Tribunal) was illegal under US law, including the Geneva Conventions.

The president requested and Congress passed the Military Commissions Act of 2006. The bill was controversial for continuing to authorize the President to designate certain people as "unlawful enemy combatants," thus making them subject to military commissions, and depriving them of habeas corpus. In Boumediene v. Bush (2008), the US Supreme Court ruled that foreign detainees held by the United States, including those at Guantanamo Bay detention camp, did have the right of habeas corpus under the US constitution, as the US had sole authority at the Guantanamo Bay base. It held that the 2006 Military Commissions Act was an unconstitutional suspension of that right.

On January 18, 2007, Gonzales was invited to speak to the Senate Judiciary Committee, where he shocked the committee's ranking member, Arlen Specter of Pennsylvania, with statements regarding the right of habeas corpus in the United States Constitution. An excerpt of the exchange follows:

Gonzales: The fact that the Constitution—again, there is no express grant of habeas in the Constitution. There is a prohibition against taking it away. But it's never been the case, and I'm not a Supreme—

Specter: Now, wait a minute. Wait a minute. The Constitution says you can't take it away, except in the case of rebellion or invasion. Doesn't that mean you have the right of habeas corpus, unless there is an invasion or rebellion?

Gonzales: I meant by that comment, the Constitution doesn't say, "Every individual in the United States or every citizen is hereby granted or assured the right to habeas." It doesn't say that. It simply says the right of habeas corpus shall not be suspended except by —

Senator Specter was referring to 2nd Clause of Section 9 of Article One of the Constitution of the United States, which reads: "The Privilege of the Writ of Habeas Corpus shall not be suspended, unless when in Cases of Rebellion or Invasion the public Safety may require it." This passage has been historically interpreted to mean that the right of habeas corpus is inherently established. Gonzales dissented from the consensus view, siding with Professor Erwin Chemerinsky, who said "[a]though the Constitution prohibits Congress from suspending the writ of habeas corpus except during times of rebellion or invasion, this provision was probably meant to keep Congress from suspending the writ and preventing state courts from releasing individuals who were wrongfully imprisoned. The constitutional provision does not create a right to habeas corpus; rather federal statutes [do]." Additionally, "the Constitutional Convention prevented Congress from obstructing the states courts' ability to grant the writ, but did not try to create a federal constitutional right to habeas corpus". "After all, if the suspension clause itself were an affirmative grant of procedural rights to those held in federal custody, there would have been little need for the first Congress to enact as it did, habeas corpus protections in the Judiciary Act of 1789." Chemerinsky's argument has been denied by Justice Paul Stevens in a 2001 opinion in an immigration case involving the issue, where Stevens touches upon what he believes the 'far more sensible view':

The dissent reads into Chief Justice Marshall's opinion in Ex parte Bollman, 4 Cranch 75 (1807), support for a proposition that the Chief Justice did not endorse, either explicitly or implicitly. See post, at 14—15. He did note that "the first congress of the United States" acted under "the immediate influence" of the injunction provided by the Suspension Clause when it gave "life and activity" to "this great constitutional privilege" in the Judiciary Act of 1789, and that the writ could not be suspended until after the statute was enacted. 4 Cranch, at 95. That statement, however, surely does not imply that Marshall believed the Framers had drafted a Clause that would proscribe a temporary abrogation of the writ, while permitting its permanent suspension. Indeed, Marshall's comment expresses the far more sensible view that the Clause was intended to preclude any possibility that "the privilege itself would be lost" by either the inaction or the action of Congress. See, e.g., ibid. (noting that the Founders "must have felt, with peculiar force, the obligation" imposed by the Suspension Clause).

Justice Stevens' assertion is backed up by sentiments found in the Federalist No. 84, which enshrines the right to petition for habeas corpus as fundamental:

The establishment of the writ of habeas corpus, the prohibition of ex post facto laws, and of TITLES OF NOBILITY, to which we have no corresponding provision in our Constitution, are perhaps greater securities to liberty and republicanism than any it contains. The creation of crimes after the commission of the fact, or, in other words, the subjecting of men to punishment for things which, when they were done, were breaches of no law, and the practice of arbitrary imprisonments, have been, in all ages, the favorite and most formidable instruments of tyranny."

The Constitution presupposes that courts in the United States will have the authority to issue the writ as they historically did at common law. See, e.g., Immigration and Naturalization Service v. St. Cyr, 533 U.S. 289 (2001); Felker v. Turpin, 518 U.S. 651, 666 (1996). The Suspension clause of the Constitution provides that "[t]he privilege of the writ of Habeas Corpus shall not be suspended, unless when in case of rebellion or invasion the public safety may require it." As some commentators have noted, "the text does not explicitly confer a right to habeas relief, but merely sets forth when the Privilege of the Writ may be suspended".

As Robert Parry writes in the Baltimore Chronicle & Sentinel:

Applying Gonzales's reasoning, one could argue that the First Amendment doesn't explicitly say Americans have the right to worship as they choose, speak as they wish or assemble peacefully. Ironically, Gonzales may be wrong in another way about the lack of specificity in the Constitution's granting of habeas corpus rights. Many of the legal features attributed to habeas corpus are delineated in a positive way in the Sixth Amendment ...

=== Dismissal of U.S. attorneys ===
By law, U.S. Attorneys are appointed for a term of four years, and each U.S. Attorney serves at the pleasure of the President and is subject to removal by the President for any reason, or no reason at all, barring only illegal and improper reasons. When Gonzales became attorney general in 2005, he ordered a performance review of all U.S. Attorneys. On December 7, 2006, seven United States attorneys were notified by the United States Department of Justice that they were being dismissed, after the George W. Bush administration sought their resignation. One more, Bud Cummins, who had been informed of his dismissal in June 2006, announced his resignation on December 15, 2006, effective December 20, 2006, upon being notified of Tim Griffin's appointment as interim U.S. attorney for the Eastern District of Arkansas. In the subsequent congressional hearings and press reports, it was disclosed that additional U.S. attorneys were controversially dismissed without explanation to the dismissee in 2005 and 2006, and that at least 26 U.S. attorneys were at various times considered for dismissal.

Although U.S. attorneys can be dismissed at the discretion of the president, critics claimed that the dismissals were either motivated by desire to install attorneys more loyal to the Republican party ("loyal Bushies," in the words of Kyle Sampson, Gonzales's former chief of staff) or as retribution for actions or inactions damaging to the Republican party. At least six of the eight had received positive performance reviews at the Department of Justice. DOJ officials Will Moschella and Monica Goodling both testified under oath that EARS evaluations are office-wide reviews, they are not reviews of the U.S. Attorneys themselves. Gonzales testified under oath that EARS evaluations do not necessarily reflect on the U.S. Attorney. In other words, these reviews were not evaluations of the performance of the fired federal prosecutors.

In a press conference given on March 13, Gonzales suggested that "incomplete information, was communicated or may have been communicated to the Congress" and he accepted full responsibility. Nonetheless, Gonzales avowed that his knowledge of the process to fire and select new US attorneys was limited to how the US attorneys may have been classified as "strong performers, not-as-strong performers, and weak performers." Gonzales also asserted that was all he knew of the process, saying that "[I] was not involved in seeing any memos, was not involved in any discussions about what was going on. That's basically what I knew as the Attorney General."

Department of Justice records released on March 23, however, appeared to contradict some of the Attorney General's assertions, indicating that on his Nov 27 schedule "he attended an hour-long meeting at which, aides said, he approved a detailed plan for executing the purge." Despite insisting that he was not involved in the "deliberations" leading up to the firing of the attorneys, newly released emails also suggest that he had indeed been notified and that he had given ultimate approval.

In his prepared testimony to Congress on April 19, 2007, Gonzales insisted he left the decisions on the firings to his staff. ABC News, however, obtained an internal department email showing that Gonzales urged the ouster of Carol Lam, one of the fired attorneys, six months before she was asked to leave. During actual testimony on April 19, Gonzales stated at least 71 times that he couldn't recall events related to the controversy. Those dubious explanations led to diminished Senate support for his continued tenure, with even conservative Republicans Jeff Sessions of Alabama and Tom Coburn of Oklahoma calling for his resignation.

His responses frustrated the Democrats on the committee, as well as several Republicans. One example of such frustration came in an exchange between Sessions and Gonzales regarding a November 2006 meeting. Sessions was one of the most conservative members of the Senate, and was one of the Bush Administration's staunchest allies. At the meeting, the attorney firings were purportedly discussed, but Gonzales did not remember such discussion. As reported by the Washington Post, the dialogue went as follows:

Gonzales: Well, Senator, putting aside the issue, of course, sometimes people's recollections are different, I have no reason to doubt Mr. Battle's testimony [about the November meeting].

Sessions: Well, I guess I'm concerned about your recollection, really, because it's not that long ago. It was an important issue. And that's troubling to me, I've got to tell you.

Gonzales: Senator, I went back and looked at my calendar for that week. I traveled to Mexico for the inauguration of the new president. We had National Meth Awareness Day. We were working on a very complicated issue relating to CFIUS.

GONZALES: And so there were a lot of other weighty issues and matters that I was dealing with that week.

Another example came when Senator Chuck Schumer of New York, who had been the first lawmaker to call for Gonzales's ouster, declined to ask his last round of questions. Instead, a visibly angry Schumer said there was no point to further questioning and reiterated his call for Gonzales to resign. By Schumer's count, Gonzales had stated "over a hundred times" that he didn't know or couldn't recall important details concerning the firings, and also didn't seem to know about the workings of his own department. Gonzales responded that the onus was on the committee to prove whether anything improper occurred. Schumer replied that Gonzales faced a higher standard, and that under this standard he had to give "a full, complete and convincing explanation" for why the eight attorneys were fired.

Both Democrats and Republicans were critical of Gonzales's testimony to congress, which was widely regarded as exhibiting greater loyalty to president Bush than to the truth. With increasing numbers of senators calling for him to go, Gonzales resigned as attorney general effective September 17, 2007.

The Inspector General and the Office of Professional Responsibility commenced an investigation into the removal of nine U.S. Attorneys and issued a report in September 2008. The report cited serious issues of accountability removing a few of the U.S. Attorneys, but there was no finding that the nine U.S. Attorneys were removed for illegal or improper reasons. To the contrary, the report concluded that Margaret Chiara and Kevin Ryan were removed appropriately for management issues. Paul Charlton was removed for his action relating to a death penalty case and unilateral implementation of an interrogation policy. The report found Carol Lam was removed because of the Justice Department's concerns about the low number of gun and immigration prosecutions in her district. The report concluded John McKay was asked to leave because of his disagreement with the Deputy Attorney General over an information-sharing program. The report could not cite to a reason Dan Bogden was asked to leave, but there was no finding that anything illegal or improper occurred with his removal. The report concluded Bud Cummins was asked to leave to make room for another political appointee that he himself conceded under oath was qualified to serve as a U.S. Attorney. These findings were consistent with testimony given by Gonzales. Politics was clearly involved.

The report also concluded Todd Graves was removed to settle a political dispute in Missouri, which was motivated by politics. The report found that it could not conclude that David Iglesias was removed for an improper reason. Because the IG had no authority to investigate Congress or the White House, the IG asked Attorney General Mukasey to appoint a special prosecutor to investigate the Iglesias removal. This special prosecutor found no wrongdoing in the removal of Iglesias. The DOJ IG found no criminal wrongdoing in the records. As the Wall Street Journal reported "the Justice Department informed Congress on Wednesday that a special investigator in the case found no evidence of wrongdoing ... the investigator's final word is that no Administration official gave 'false statements' to Congress or to the DOJ Inspector General, which carried out their own investigation." In particular, the report found no evidence that Gonzales made false or misleading statements to Congress, thus clearing him of accusations of perjury.

The IG report determined that some statements made by Gonzales at a March 13, 2007, press conference about his involvement were inaccurate. The report did not conclude that Gonzales deliberately provided false information. He acknowledged from the outset his misstatements, accepted responsibility, and attempted to set the record straight well before congressional testimony on April 19, 2007. Gonzales testified 18 months before the IG reports that statements he made at the March 13, 2007, press conference were misstatements and were overboard. Further, in his written statement to the Senate Judiciary Committee, presented April 19, 2007, Gonzales wrote: "I misspoke at a press conference on March 13th when I said that I "was not involved in any discussions about what was going on." That statement was too broad. At that same press conference, I made clear that I was aware of the process; I said, "I knew my Chief of Staff was involved in the process of determining who were the weak performers, where were the districts around the country where we could do better for the people in that district, and that's what I knew". Of course, I knew about the process because of, at a minimum, these discussions with Mr. Sampson. Thus, my statement about "discussions" was imprecise and overboard, but it certainly was not in any way an attempt to mislead the American people."

In August 2009, White House documents released showed that Rove raised concerns directly with Gonzales and that Domenici or an intermediary may have contacted the Justice Department as early as 2005 to complain. In contrast, Gonzales told the Senate Judiciary Committee in 2007: "I don't recall ... Senator Domenici ever requesting that Mr. Iglesias be removed." In July 2010, Department of Justice prosecutors closed the two-year investigation without filing charges after determining that the firings were not criminal, saying "Evidence did not demonstrate that any prosecutable criminal offense was committed with regard to the removal of David Iglesias. The investigative team also determined that the evidence did not warrant expanding the scope of the investigation beyond the removal of Iglesias."

=== NSA domestic eavesdropping program ===
Gonzales was an early advocate of the controversial USA PATRIOT Act, which was passed by Congress and signed into law by President Bush on October 26, 2001. During Gonzales's tenure, the Justice Department and the Federal Bureau of Investigation were accused of improperly, and perhaps illegally, using the USA PATRIOT Act to uncover personal information about U.S. citizens.

In a December 2005 article in The New York Times, it was revealed that the National Security Agency (NSA) was eavesdropping on U.S. citizens without warrants in cases where (i) NSA intelligence agents had reason to believe at least one party to the call was a member of al Qaeda or a group affiliated with al Qaeda, and (ii) the call was international. The New York Times acknowledged that the activities had been classified, and that it had disclosed the activities over the Administration's objections. As such, Attorney General Gonzales threatened the Times with prosecution under the Espionage Act of 1917, since knowing publication of classified information is a federal crime. Gonzales raised the possibility that The New York Times journalists could be prosecuted for publishing classified information based on the outcome of the criminal investigation underway into leaks to the Times of data about the National Security Agency's surveillance of terrorist-related calls between the United States and abroad. He said, "I understand very much the role that the press plays in our society, the protection under the First Amendment we want to protect and respect ..." As for the Times, he said, "As we do in every case, it's a case-by-case evaluation about what the evidence shows us, our interpretation of the law. We have an obligation to enforce the law and to prosecute those who engage in criminal activity."

The publication led to an investigation by the Office of Professional Responsibility (OPR) over the role of Department of Justice (DOJ) lawyers in giving legal advice to support various intelligence collection activities. OPR is responsible for investigating allegations of professional misconduct by DOJ attorneys. The objective of OPR is to ensure that DOJ attorneys perform their duties in accordance with the highest professional standards.

The Bush Administration and Attorney General Gonzales believed that OPR did not have the authority to investigate Gonzales's role as White House Counsel in connection with certain intelligence activities authorized by the President. In response to suggestions that Gonzales blocked the investigation or that the President blocked the investigation to protect Gonzales, Assistant Attorney General Richard Hertling informed Chairman John Conyers on March 22, 2007, that "the President made the decision not to grant the requested security clearances to" OPR staff. Judge Gonzales "was not told he was the subject or target of the OPR investigation, nor did he believe himself to be ..." Judge Gonzales "did not ask the President to shut down or otherwise impede the OPR investigation". Judge Gonzales "recommended to the President that OPR be granted security clearance."

In a letter to the Senate dated August 1, 2007, Gonzales disclosed that shortly after the September 11 attacks, the President authorized the NSA, under a single Presidential Authorization, to engage in a number of intelligence activities, which would later be collectively described as the "President's Surveillance Program" (PSP) by the DOJ Inspector General, Glenn A. Fine. Some of these authorized activities were described as the "Terrorist Surveillance Program" (TSP) by President Bush, in an address to the nation on December 16, 2005. As the August 1 letter indicates, the dispute between the President and James Comey that led to the hospital visit was not over TSP, it concerned other classified intelligence activities that are part of PSP and have not been disclosed. He defended his authorization of the program, asserting "if you are talking with al-Qaeda, we want to know why." In his letter, Gonzales wrote the Senate Judiciary Committee that he defined TSP as the program the President publicly confirmed, a program that targets communications where one party is outside the United States, and as to which the government had reason to believe at least one party to the communication is a member of al-Qaeda or an affiliated terrorist organization. Indeed, prior to the 2007 letter, Gonzales provided the same definition of TSP in several public appearances leading up to a hearing in Congress on February 6, 2006.

In March 2004, the TSP operations, (code-named Stellar Wind,) became the focal point for a dispute between the White House and then-acting-Attorney-General James B. Comey, resulting in a dramatic, late-night meeting between Gonzales, Comey, the bedridden AG John Ashcroft, and other DOJ officials, in a George Washington University Hospital room. According to initial statements by Gonzales, the disagreement was not over TSP; rather, he claimed it concerned other classified intelligence activities that fell under the PSP, which had not been disclosed. Comey contended that the incident, (which had culminated in a heated phone conversation following the hospital visit,) had indeed been over the activities comprising the TSP. Through a spokesperson, Gonzales later denied his original assertion that the dispute was over TSP, claiming that he had misspoken. The controversy over these conflicting statements led Senator Charles Schumer to request appointment of a special prosecutor to investigate if Gonzales had committed perjury.

In testimony to the Senate Judiciary Committee on May 15, 2007, former Deputy Attorney General Comey was asked to recall the events of the evening of March 10, 2004, when, (at the behest of President Bush,) Gonzales and Bush's then-chief-of-staff Andrew H. Card Jr. sought to bypass Comey's refusal to authorize "a particular classified program," by appealing to the ailing John Ashcroft in a visit to his hospital bedside, as he recovered from surgery for pancreatitis. According to Comey, he had consulted with AG Ashcroft prior to his hospitalization and, (though Ashcroft had previously signed off on the program many times in previous years,) the two of them came to agree that there had arisen legitimate concerns, which interfered with the ability of the attorney general's office, "to certify (the program's) legality, which was our obligation for the program to be renewed." More than a week later, Comey continued, Ashcroft had become extremely ill and his wife had forbidden any visitors to his hospital room, so when he and the other officials met at his bedside on March 10, he was very concerned about General Ashcroft's ability to think clearly about the issue at hand.

In walked Mr. Gonzales, carrying an envelope, and Mr. Card. They came over and stood by the bed. They greeted the attorney general very briefly, and then Mr. Gonzales began to discuss why they were there, to seek his approval ... I was very upset. I was angry. I thought I had just witnessed an effort to take advantage of a very sick man, who did not have the powers of the attorney general because they had been transferred to me.

Later testimony from Gonzales and others confirmed that Ashcroft did not seem disoriented, but in fact seemed lucid enough to describe to Card and Gonzales, in great detail, the basis of the Department's legal arguments, and even to complain about clearance decisions by the President relative to the TSP.

Comey also testified that there was significant dissent among top law enforcement officers over the program, although he did not specifically identify it in the hearing. Moreover, in light of the incident at the hospital, "top Justice Department officials were prepared to resign over it."

Jack Goldsmith, the former head of the Office of Legal Counsel at the Justice Department, corroborates many of the details of Comey's Senate testimony regarding the March 10, 2004, hospital room visit, in a preview of his book "The Terror Presidency", which was to be published in Fall 2007. In the September 9, 2007, issue of The New York Times Magazine Jeffrey Rosen reports on an extended interview he had with Goldsmith, who was also in the hospital room that night.

As he recalled it to me, Goldsmith received a call in the evening from his deputy, Philbin, telling him to go to the George Washington University Hospital immediately, since Gonzales and Card were on the way there. Goldsmith raced to the hospital, double-parked outside and walked into a dark room. Ashcroft lay with a bright light shining on him and tubes and wires coming out of his body.

Suddenly, Gonzales and Card came in the room and announced that they were there in connection with the classified program. "Ashcroft, who looked like he was near death, sort of puffed up his chest," Goldsmith recalls. "All of a sudden, energy and color came into his face, and he said that he didn't appreciate them coming to visit him under those circumstances, that he had concerns about the matter they were asking about and that, in any event, he wasn't the attorney general at the moment; Jim Comey was. He actually gave a two-minute speech, and I was sure at the end of it he was going to die. It was the most amazing scene I've ever witnessed."

After a bit of silence, Goldsmith told me, Gonzales thanked Ashcroft, and he and Card walked out of the room. "At that moment," Goldsmith recalled, "Mrs. Ashcroft, who obviously couldn't believe what she saw happening to her sick husband, looked at Gonzales and Card as they walked out of the room and stuck her tongue out at them. She had no idea what we were discussing, but this sweet-looking woman sticking out her tongue was the ultimate expression of disapproval. It captured the feeling in the room perfectly."

Comey also testified that Ashcroft "expressed himself in very strong terms." Goldsmith testified that Ashcroft spoke at length about the legal issue. "Attorney General Ashcroft ... [gave] a couple of minutes' speech in which he said that he .... shared the Justice department's concerns." Although he was not present for the conversation between Gonzales and Ashcroft, FBI Director Bob Mueller testified, "Ashcroft complained to Judge Gonzales about White House compartmentalization rules preventing Ashcroft from getting the advice he needed." On July 24, 2007, Gonzales testified that he and Card were also concerned about Ashcroft's competency. "Obviously there was concern about General Ashcroft's condition. And we would not have sought nor did we intend to get any approval from General Ashcroft if in fact he wasn't fully competent to make the decision." In response to a question from Senator Hatch, Gonzales continued, "Obviously we were concerned about the condition of General Ashcroft. We obviously knew he had been ill and had surgery. And we never had any intent to ask anything of him if we did not feel that he was competent. When we got there, I will just say that Mr. Ashcroft did most of the talking. We were there maybe five minutes – five to six minutes. Mr. Ashcroft talked about the legal issues in a lucid form, as I've heard him talk about legal issues in the White House. During the July 24 hearing, Gonzales's testimony lasted for almost four hours before the Senate Judiciary Committee. He appeared to contradict the earlier statements made by James Comey regarding the hospital room meeting with John Ashcroft.

Mr. Comey's testimony about the hospital visit was about other intelligence activities—disagreement over other intelligence activities. That's how we'd clarify it.

Senator Chuck Schumer confronted Gonzales over this statement: "That is not what Mr. Comey says; that is not what the people in the room say." Gonzales responded "That's how we clarify it." Nonetheless, the DOJ Inspector General's report concluded that there was nothing false or intentionally misleading in Gonzales's account.

The Inspector General also concluded that the dispute between the White House and the DOJ concerned "Other Intelligence Activities," which, though they had been implemented through the same Presidential Authorization, were not the same as the communications interception activities that the President publicly identified as the Terrorist Surveillance Program. The DOJ Inspector General agreed with Gonzales noting in his report that the "dispute-which resulted in the visit to Attorney General Ashcroft's hospital room by Gonzales and Card and brought several senior DOJ and FBI officials to the brink of resignations – concerned certain of the Other Intelligence Activities that were different from the communication interception activities that the President later publicly acknowledged as the Terrorist Surveillance Program, but that had been implemented through the same Presidential Authorization. As the IG report confirms, the dispute involved Other Intelligence Activities, it was not about TSP.

Through his testimony before Congress on issues ranging from the Patriot Act to U.S. Attorney firings, he commonly admitted ignorance. The response to Gonzales's testimony by those Senators serving on both the Judiciary and Intelligence Committees was one of disbelief. Russ Feingold, who is a member of both the Judiciary and Intelligence committees, said, "I believe your testimony is misleading at best," which Sheldon Whitehouse—also a member of both committees—concurred with, saying, "I have exactly the same perception." Chuck Schumer said Gonzales was "not being straightforward" with the committee. Judiciary Committee Chairman Patrick Leahy said, "I just don't trust you," and urged Gonzales to carefully review his testimony. The ranking Republican on the Judiciary Committee, Arlen Specter, said to Gonzales, "Your credibility has been breached to the point of being actionable." Leahy and Specter's comments were interpreted as warnings that Gonzales might have been perjuring himself. After the meeting, Intelligence Committee Chairman Jay Rockefeller said Gonzales was being "untruthful." Rockefeller's sentiments were echoed by Jane Harman, a senior member of the House Intelligence Committee, who accused Gonzales of "selectively declassifying information to defend his own conduct."

On July 26, 2007, the Associated Press obtained a four-page memorandum from the office of former Director of National Intelligence John D. Negroponte dated May 17, 2006, which appeared to contradict Gonzales's testimony the previous day regarding the subject of a March 10, 2004, emergency Congressional briefing that preceded his hospital room meeting with former attorney general John Ashcroft, James B. Comey and former White House Chief of Staff Andrew H. Card Jr. There was no contradiction, however, as the July 1, 2009, IG report confirms. Shortly after the September 11 attacks, the President authorized a number of intelligence activities reported by the IG on the President's Surveillance Program (PSP). One set of activities were TSP, but the dispute was about certain of the Other Intelligence Activities. The IG report is clear on p. 37 that the TSP "was not the subject of the hospital room confrontation or the threatened resignations." P. 36 of the Inspector General report goes on to say that the White House had a major disagreement related to PSP. The dispute that resulted in the visit to Attorney General Ashcroft's hospital room by Gonzales and Card and brought several senior DOJ and FBI officials to the brink of resignation-concerned certain of the Other Intelligence Activities that were different from the communications interception activities that the President later publicly acknowledged as the TSP, but that had been implemented through the same President Authorizations.

On that same day, Federal Bureau of Investigation (FBI) Director Robert S. Mueller III also seemed to dispute the accuracy of Gonzales's Senate Judiciary Committee testimony of the previous day regarding the events of March 10, 2004, in his own sworn testimony on that subject before the House Judiciary Committee.

Rep. Sheila Jackson Lee (D-TX) asked Mueller "Did you have an opportunity to talk to General Ashcroft, or did he discuss what was discussed in the meeting with Attorney General Gonzales and the chief of staff?" He replied "I did have a brief discussion with Attorney General Ashcroft." Lee went on to ask "I guess we use [the phrase] TSP [Terrorist Surveillance Program], we use warrantless wiretapping. So would I be comfortable in saying that those were the items that were part of the discussion?" He responded "It was—the discussion was on a national—an NSA program that has been much discussed, yes."

On Thursday, August 16, 2007, the House Judiciary Committee released the heavily redacted notes of FBI Director Robert S. Mueller III regarding the Justice Department and White House deliberations of March 2004, which included the March 10, 2004, hospital-room visit of Gonzales and Andrew H. Card Jr. on John Ashcroft in the presence of then-acting Attorney General James B. Comey. The notes list 26 meetings and phone conversations over three weeks—from March 1 to 23—during a debate that reportedly almost led to mass resignations at the Justice Department and the Federal Bureau of Investigation.

On July 26, 2007, a letter to Solicitor General Paul Clement, Senators Charles Schumer, Dianne Feinstein, Russ Feingold and Sheldon Whitehouse urged that an independent counsel be appointed to investigate whether Gonzales had perjured himself in his testimony before the Senate Judiciary Committee on the previous day. "We ask that you immediately appoint an independent special counsel from outside the Department of Justice to determine whether Attorney General Gonzales may have misled Congress or perjured himself in testimony before Congress," the letter read in part. According to the July 10, 2009, DOJ Inspector General Unclassified Report on the President's Surveillance Program, Gonzales did not intend to mislead Congress. There was no finding of perjury or other criminal wrongdoing by Gonzales.

On Wednesday, June 27, 2007, the Senate Judiciary Committee issued subpoenas to the United States Department of Justice, the White House, and Vice President Dick Cheney seeking internal documents regarding the program's legality and details of the NSA's cooperative agreements with private telecommunications corporations. In addition to the subpoenas, committee chairman Patrick Leahy sent Gonzales a letter about possible false statements made under oath by U.S. Court of Appeals Judge Brett M. Kavanaugh during his confirmation hearings before the committee the previous year. In an August 17, 2007, reply letter to Leahy asking for an extension of the August 20 deadline for compliance, White House counsel Fred Fielding argued that the subpoenas called for the production of "extraordinarily sensitive national security information," and he said much of the information—if not all—could be subject to a claim of executive privilege. On August 20, 2007, Fielding wrote to Leahy that the White House needed yet more time to respond to the subpoenas, which prompted Leahy to reply that the Senate might consider a contempt of Congress citation when it returned from its August recess.

On July 27, 2007, both White House Press Secretary Tony Snow and White House spokeswoman Dana Perino defended Gonzales's Senate Judiciary Committee testimony regarding the events of March 10, 2004, saying that it did not contradict the sworn House Judiciary Committee account of FBI director Robert S. Mueller III, because Gonzales had been constrained in what he could say because there was a danger he would divulge classified material. Lee Casey, a former Justice Department lawyer during the Ronald Reagan and George H. W. Bush administrations, told The NewsHour with Jim Lehrer that it is likely that the apparent discrepancy can be traced to the fact that there are two separate Domestic Surveillance programs. "The program that was leaked in December 2005 is the Comey program. It is not the program that was discussed in the evening when they went to Attorney General Ashcroft's hospital room. That program we know almost nothing about. We can speculate about it. ... The program about which he said there was no dispute is a program that was created after the original program died, when Mr. Comey refused to reauthorize it, in March 2004. Mr. Comey then essentially redid the program to suit his legal concerns. And about that program, there was no dispute. There was clearly a dispute about the earlier form or version of the program. The attorney general has not talked about that program. He refers to it as "other intelligence activities" because it is, in fact, still classified."

On Tuesday, August 28, 2007—one day after Gonzales announced his resignation as Attorney General effective September 17—Senate Judiciary Committee chairman Patrick Leahy indicated that it would not affect ongoing investigations by his committee. "I intend to get answers to these questions no matter how long it takes," Leahy said, suggesting that Gonzales could face subpoenas from the committee for testimony or evidence long after leaving the administration. "You'll notice that we've had people subpoenaed even though they've resigned from the White House," Leahy said, referring to Harriet E. Miers, the former White House counsel, and Karl Rove, who resigned in August 2007 as the president's top political aide. "They're still under subpoena. They still face contempt if they don't appear." Gonzales testified voluntarily to Congress and provided interviews to the Inspector General on numerous occasions. He ordered full cooperation by all Department of Justice employees with ongoing investigations.

On Thursday, August 30, 2007, Justice Department Inspector General Glenn A. Fine disclosed in a letter to the Senate Judiciary Committee that as part of a previously ongoing investigation, his office is looking into whether Gonzales made statements to Congress that were "intentionally false, misleading, or inappropriate," both about the firing of federal prosecutors and about the terrorist-surveillance program, as committee chairman Patrick Leahy had asked him to do in an August 16, 2007, letter. Fine's letter to Leahy said that his office "has ongoing investigations that relate to most of the subjects addressed by the attorney general's testimony that you identified." Fine said that his office is conducting a particular review "relating to the terrorist-surveillance program, as well as a follow-up review of the use of national security letters," which investigators use to obtain information on e-mail messages, telephone calls and other records from private companies without court approval. Fine concluded his investigation and found that Gonzales did not intend to mislead Congress.

It has been reported that a person involved in the incident of March 10, 2004, hospital room meeting with John Ashcroft has said that much of the confusion and conflicting testimony that occurred about intelligence activities was because certain programs were so classified that they were impossible to speak about clearly. The Department of Justice Inspector General recognized that Gonzales was in the difficult position of testifying before the Senate Judiciary Committee about a highly classified program in an open forum.

On July 31, 2007, Director of National Intelligence Mike McConnell confirmed, in a letter to Senator Specter, that the activities publicly referred to "as the TSP did not exhaust the activities subject to periodic authorization by the President." Gonzales was then able to explain publicly, on August 1, 2007, that while TSP "was an extraordinary activity that presented novel and difficult issues and was, as [he understood], the subject of intense deliberations within the Department," the aspect of Mr. Comey's advise [sic] that prompted the Gang of Eight meeting on March 10, 2004, was not about TSP, but was about another or other aspects of the intelligence activities in question, which activities remain classified. Comey himself acknowledged that the nature of the disagreement at issue on March 10, 2004, is "a very complicated matter", but he declined to discuss in a public setting. Professor Jack Goldsmith appears to acknowledge that there is a difference between TSP and other classified intelligence activities that prompted the March 10, 2004, Gang of Eight meeting and visit to General Ashcroft's hospital room.

=== Gonzales v. Carhart ===
As Attorney General, Gonzalez led the Justice Department's defense of the 2003 Partial Birth Abortion Act when it was challenged in court and for this reason the legal case bears his name. The Supreme Court issued its opinion in this case on April 18, 2007, ruling in favor of Gonzalez and the Justice Department and upholding the 2003 Partial Birth Abortion Act as constitutional.

== Speculation on Supreme Court nomination ==
Shortly before the July 1, 2005, retirement announcement of Associate Justice of the Supreme Court of the United States Sandra Day O'Connor, rumors started circulating that a memo had leaked from the White House stating that upon the retirement of either O'Connor or Chief Justice of the United States William Rehnquist, that Gonzales would be the first nominee for a vacancy on the Court.

Quickly, conservative stalwarts such as National Review magazine and Focus on the Family, among other socially conservative groups, stated they would oppose a Gonzales nomination.

Much of their opposition to Gonzales was based on his perceived support of abortion rights as a result of one vote on a single case before the Texas Supreme Court, In re Jane Doe 5 (43 Tex. Sup. J.910).

In a series of cases before the Texas Supreme Court in 2000, the court was asked to construe for the first time the 1999 Texas parental notification law forbidding a physician from performing an abortion on a pregnant, unaccompanied minor without giving notice to the minor's parents at least 48 hours before the procedure. Texas legislators adopted a policy to create a judicial bypass exception in those cases where (1) the minor is mature and sufficiently well informed to make the decision to have an abortion performed without notification to either of her parents; (2) notification will not be in the best interest of the minor or (3) notification may lead to physical, sexual or emotional abuse of the minor. The court was asked in these cases to discern legislative intent for the first time to these subjective standards, presumably included in the law as a matter of Texas policy and to make the law constitutional under U.S. Supreme Court precedents.

In the seven parental notification decisions rendered by the court, Gonzales voted to grant one bypass. For In re Jane Doe 5 his concurring opinion began with the sentence, "I fully join in the Court's judgment and opinion." He went on, though, to address the three dissenting opinions, primarily one by Nathan L. Hecht alleging that the court majority's members had disregarded legislative intent in favor of their personal ideologies. Gonzales's opinion dealt mostly with how to establish legislative intent. He wrote, "We take the words of the statute as the surest guide to legislative intent. Once we discern the Legislature's intent we must put it into effect, even if we ourselves might have made different policy choices." He added, "[T]o construe the Parental Notification Act so narrowly as to eliminate bypasses, or to create hurdles that simply are not to be found in the words of the statute, would be an unconscionable act of judicial activism," and "While the ramifications of such a law and the results of the Court's decision here may be personally troubling to me as a parent, it is my obligation as a judge to impartially apply the laws of this state without imposing my moral view on the decisions of the Legislature."

Political commentators had suggested that Bush forecast the selection of Gonzales with his comments defending the Attorney General made on July 6, 2005, in Copenhagen, Denmark. Bush stated, "I don't like it when a friend gets criticized. I'm loyal to my friends. All of a sudden this fellow, who is a good public servant and a really fine person, is under fire. And so, do I like it? No, I don't like it, at all." This speculation proved to be incorrect, however.

After the death of Chief Justice William Rehnquist on September 3, 2005, creating a vacancy, speculation resumed that President George W. Bush might nominate Gonzales to the Court. Bush, however, decided instead to nominate D.C. Circuit Court judge John Roberts to the chief justice position. On October 3, 2005, he nominated Harriet Miers as associate justice to replace the retiring Justice Sandra Day O'Connor. On October 27, 2005, Miers withdrew her nomination, again renewing speculation about a possible Gonzales nomination. This was laid to rest when Judge Samuel Alito received the nomination and subsequent confirmation.

On September 11, 2005, U.S. Senate Committee on the Judiciary chairman Arlen Specter was quoted as saying that it was "a little too soon" after Gonzales's appointment as attorney general for him to be appointed to another position, and that such an appointment would require a new series of confirmation hearings. "He [Gonzales] is attacked a lot," observes Larry Sabato, a political analyst and the director of the Center for Politics at the University of Virginia, who adds that the serious political spats "virtually eliminated him from the Supreme Court chase."

== Resignation ==
=== Demand ===
A number of members of both houses of Congress publicly said Gonzales should resign, or be fired by Bush. Calls for his ousting intensified after his testimony on April 19, 2007. But the President gave Gonzales a strong vote of confidence saying, "This is an honest, honorable man, in whom I have confidence." The President said that Gonzales's testimony "increased my confidence" in his ability to lead the Justice Department. Separately, a White House spokeswoman said, "He's staying".

On May 24, 2007, Senators Charles Schumer (D-NY), Dianne Feinstein (D-CA), and Sheldon Whitehouse (D-RI) of the Senate Judiciary Committee announced the Democrats' proposed no-confidence resolution to vote on whether "Attorney General Alberto Gonzales no longer holds the confidence of the Senate and the American People." (The vote would have had no legal effect, but was designed to persuade Gonzales to depart or President Bush to seek a new attorney general.) A similar resolution was introduced in the House by Rep. Adam Schiff (D-CA).

On June 11, 2007, a Senate vote on cloture to end debate on the resolution failed (60 votes are required for cloture). The vote was 53 to 38 with 7 not voting and 1 voting "present" (one senate seat was vacant). Seven Republicans, John E. Sununu, Chuck Hagel, Susan Collins, Arlen Specter, Olympia Snowe, Gordon Smith and Norm Coleman voted to end debate; Independent Democrat Joseph Lieberman voted against ending debate. No Democrat voted against the motion. Not voting: Biden (D-DE), Brownback (R-KS), Coburn (R-OK), Dodd (D-CT), Johnson (D-SD), McCain (R-AZ), Obama (D-IL). Stevens (R-AK) voted "present."

On July 30, 2007, MSNBC reported that Rep. Jay Inslee announced that he would introduce a bill the following day that would require the House Judiciary Committee to begin an impeachment investigation against Gonzales.

Others wrote in support of Gonzales, including the Latino Coalition and the Federal Law Enforcement Officers Association.

Partial list of Members of Congress calling for departure

Democrats calling for departure:

- Sen. Harry Reid (D-NV), Senate Majority Leader: "It's foolishness if (President Bush) hangs on to him"
- Sen. Chuck Schumer (D-NY), Vice-Chairman of Senate Democratic Conference, chairman of the Democratic Senatorial Campaign Committee and member of the Senate Judiciary Committee: "doesn't accept or doesn't understand that he is no longer just the president's lawyer," "carrying out the political wishes of the President" (first member of either chamber to call for ouster)
- Sen. Patrick Leahy (D-VT), Chairman of the Senate Judiciary Committee: "I don't think he can be effective"
- Sen. Joe Biden (D-DE), member of the Senate Judiciary Committee: "I think we'd be better off if he did (resign), but that's a judgment the president is going to have to make"
- Sen. Maria Cantwell (D-WA): "perplexed by the attorney general's testimony," "he has served as the president's lawyer, not our nation's"
- Sen. Hillary Clinton (D-NY): "buck should stop somewhere"
- Sen. Chris Dodd (D-CT): "egregious lapses in judgment"
- Sen. Dianne Feinstein (D-CA), member of the Senate Judiciary Committee: "I believe he should step down ... the nation is not well served by this"
- Sen. Ted Kennedy (D-MA), member of the Senate Judiciary Committee: "his resignation is long overdue"
- Sen. John Kerry (D-MA): "there must be accountability from the top down"
- Sen. Blanche Lincoln (D-AR): "I believe the Administration and the nation would be better served if Mr. Gonzales were replaced."
- Sen. Bill Nelson (D-FL): "lost his credibility"
- Sen. Barack Obama (D-IL): "subverted justice to promote a political agenda"
- Sen. Mark Pryor (D-AR): "when the Attorney General lies to a United States Senator ... it's time for that Attorney General to go"
- Sen. Sheldon Whitehouse (D-RI), member of the Senate Judiciary Committee: "he had a hard sell to make to me, and he didn't make it"
- Sen. Ken Salazar (D-CO): "I believe it is in the best interest of our Nation for the Department of Justice to get a fresh start with a new Attorney General."
- Rep. Nancy Pelosi (D-CA), Speaker of the House of Representatives: "has lost the trust of the American people"
- Rep. Shelley Berkley (D-NV): "shredded his credibility"
- Rep. Rick Larsen (D-WA): "has not been forthcoming"
- Rep. Adam Schiff (D-CA), member of the House Judiciary Committee: told Gonzales in House testimony that it "makes me ill to see what has happened" to the Justice Department, and that "I don't think you're the one to fix it"

Republicans calling for Gonzales to leave:

- Sen. John E. Sununu (R-NH), first Republican to call for ouster: "If I were the president, I would fire the attorney general"
- Sen. Gordon Smith (R-OR): ouster "would be helpful"
- Sen. Tom Coburn (R-OK), member of the Senate Judiciary Committee: told Gonzales at hearing that "the best way to put this behind us is your resignation"; had earlier described affair as "idiocy"
- Sen. John McCain (R-AZ): "very disappointed in his performance", "it would be best for Gonzales to quit"
- Sen. Jeff Sessions (R-AL), member of Senate Judiciary Committee: "If he and the President decide that he cannot be an effective leader moving forward, then he should resign."
- Sen. Norm Coleman (R-MN): "deeply concerned"
- Sen. Arlen Specter (R-PA), ranking Republican on Senate Judiciary Committee: called failure to step down "bad for the Justice Department"
- Sen. Chuck Hagel (R-NE): "lost the moral authority to lead"
- Rep. Dana Rohrabacher (R-CA): "the president should have an attorney general who is less a personal friend and more professional in his approach"
- Rep. Paul Gillmor (R-OH): "lightning rod"
- Rep. Vern Ehlers (R-MI): "he's hurt the President by what he's doing ... he's damaged himself and the President"
- Rep. Jon Porter (R-NV): "egregiously mishandled," "we need to restore confidence"
- Rep. Dean Heller (R-NV): "it's become a distraction"
- Rep. Lee Terry (R-NE): "I trusted him before, but I can't now"
- Rep. Adam Putnam (R-FL), House Republican Conference Chairman, 1st top House Republican to call for ouster: "time for fresh leadership"
- Rep. Tom Tancredo (R-CO): "a series of leadership failures"

In addition, several Republicans were critical of Gonzales, without calling for his resignation or firing:

- Sen. John Cornyn (R-TX), member of Senate Judiciary Committee: "the way this has been handled has been deplorable"
- Sen. John Ensign (R-NV), chairman of National Republican Senatorial Committee: "incompetence," "they blew it"
- Sen. Lindsey Graham (R-SC), member of Senate Judiciary Committee: "He has said some things that just don't add up"
- Sen. Susan Collins (R-ME): "I do not think he has served the president well"
- Rep. Jim Sensenbrenner (R-WI), member of House Judiciary Committee: "could die by a thousand cuts"

Republican Senators Trent Lott and Orrin Hatch expressed support for Gonzales, although Hatch conceded that Gonzales had "bungled."

=== Announcement ===
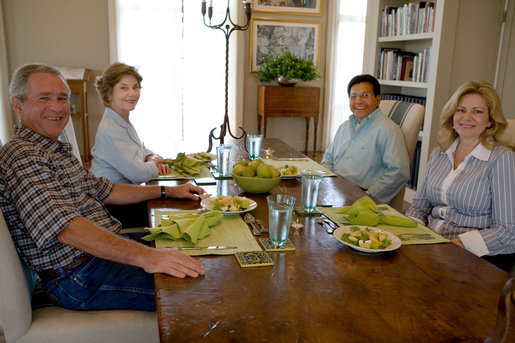
Gonzales and his wife Rebecca, with George W. Bush and Laura Bush, at the Prairie Chapel Ranch on August 26, 2007, the day that Gonzales's resignation was accepted

On August 26, 2007, Gonzales submitted his resignation as attorney general with an effective date of September 17, 2007. In a statement on August 27, Gonzales thanked the President for the opportunity to be of service to his country, giving no indication of either the reasons for his resignation or his future plans. Later that day, President Bush praised Gonzales for his service, reciting the numerous positions in Texas government, and later, the government of the United States, to which Bush had appointed Gonzales. Bush attributed the resignation to Gonzales's name having been "dragged through the mud" for "political reasons". Senators Schumer (D-NY), Feinstein (D-CA), and Specter (R-PA) replied that the resignation was entirely attributable to the excessive politicization of the attorney general's office by Gonzales, whose credibility with Congress, they asserted, was nonexistent.

=== Successor ===
On September 17, 2007, President Bush announced the nomination of ex-Judge Michael B. Mukasey to serve as Gonzales's successor. Bush also announced a revised appointment for acting attorney general: Paul Clement served for 24 hours and returned to his position as solicitor general; the departing assistant attorney general of the Civil Division, Peter Keisler was persuaded to stay on, and was appointed acting attorney general effective September 18, 2007.

== Post-resignation ==
On September 12, 2024, Gonzales endorsed Kamala Harris for president, calling Donald Trump "perhaps the most serious threat to the rule of law in a generation."

=== Investigations ===
Soon after departure from the DOJ in September 2007, continuing inquiries by Congress and the Justice Department led Gonzales to hire a criminal-defense lawyer George J. Terwilliger III, partner at White & Case, and former deputy attorney general under former president George H. W. Bush. Terwiliger was on the Republican law team involved in Florida presidential election recount battle of 2000.

On October 19, 2007, John McKay, the former U.S. Attorney for Washington's Western District, told The (Spokane) Spokesman-Review that Inspector General Glenn A. Fine may recommend criminal charges against Gonzales. The Inspector General did not recommend criminal charges against Gonzales. To the contrary, the Inspector General found no criminal wrongdoing and no perjury.

On November 15, 2007, The Washington Post reported that supporters of Gonzales had created a trust fund to help pay for his legal expenses, which were mounting as the Justice Department Inspector General's office continued to investigate whether Gonzales committed perjury or improperly tampered with a congressional witness. The Inspector General determined that Gonzales did not commit perjury or improperly tamper with a congressional witness.

In July 2008, the DOJ-OIG issued a report investigating improperly politicized hirings by the attorney general's office.

On September 2, 2008, the Inspector General found that Gonzales had stored classified documents in an insecure fashion, at his home and insufficiently secure safes at work. The Inspector General investigation found no evidence showing that there was any unauthorized disclosure of classified information resulting from his mishandling and storage of the materials in question, and the IG did not make a referral to the National Security Division for violation of a criminal statute.

Some members of Congress criticized Gonzales for selectively declassifying some of this information for political purposes. The Justice Department declined to press criminal charges.

=== Later career ===
In April 2008, The New York Times reported that Gonzales was having difficulty securing a new job, unusual for a former attorney general. Gonzales had a mediation and consulting practice in Austin, TX and taught at Texas Tech beginning in 2009. In October 2011, Belmont University College of Law announced that Gonzales would fill the Doyle Rogers Distinguished Chair of Law. Gonzalez also joined the Nashville law firm of Waller Lansden Dortch & Davis, LLP as Of Counsel.

Gonzales gave an interview to The Wall Street Journal on December 31, 2008, in which he discussed the effect that controversies in his Bush Administration roles had had on his career and public perception. He stated:

For some reason, I am portrayed as the one who is evil in formulating policies that people disagree with. I consider myself a casualty, one of the many casualties of the war on terror.

Since leaving public office he has appeared on a number of television and radio news shows, including The Situation Room with Wolf Blitzer, to discuss the nomination of Sonia Sotomayor to the U.S. Supreme Court, Larry King Live to discuss the challenges of immigration, and Geraldo at Large to discuss terrorism related issues. He has given numerous radio interviews on shows such as NPR's Tell Me More, covering such topics as Guantanamo Bay and Supreme Court nominations. Additionally, he has written opinion pieces for The Washington Post, Los Angeles Times, and USA Today, covering issues ranging from immigration to sexual predators. He stated an intention to write a book about his roles, with the intention of publishing the book "for my sons, so at least they know the story." No publishing company had agreed to promote the book at the time of the interview.

Gonzales was featured in the 2008 Academy Award-winning documentary Taxi to the Dark Side. A biography of Gonzales and his controversial public life, "The President's Counselor: The Rise to Power of Alberto Gonzales," was written in 2006 by presidential biographer and historian Bill Minutaglio.

=== Texas Tech University ===
In 2009, Texas Tech University System hired Gonzales. He acted as the diversity recruiter for both Texas Tech University and Angelo State University. Additionally, at Texas Tech, he taught a political science "special topics" course dealing with contemporary issues in the executive branch, and a graduate level course to students pursuing a master's degree in public administration. He began the new job on August 1, 2009. After the announcement, more than 40 professors at Texas Tech signed a petition opposing the hiring. Texas Tech Chancellor Kent Hance said Gonzales has generated interest in the University by recruiting outside of Lubbock and through his reputation in the news. "I had a young man come up to me Monday in a restaurant and he said, "I'm in Judge Gonzales's class, and it's the best class I've ever taken. Thank you for providing him to the community." Hance said.

=== Grand jury indictment ===
In November 2008 Gonzales was indicted by a grand jury in Willacy County in Texas. He was accused of stopping an investigation into abuses at the Willacy Detention Center, a federal detention center. Vice President Dick Cheney and other elected officials were also indicted. A judge dismissed the indictments and chastised the Willacy County district attorney, Juan Angel Gonzales, who brought the case. The district attorney himself had been under indictment for more than a year and a half before the judge dismissed the indictment. The district attorney left office after losing in a Democratic primary in March 2008. All charges were dropped after further investigation.

=== International investigation ===
On November 14, 2006, invoking universal jurisdiction, legal proceedings were started in Germany against Gonzales for his alleged involvement under the command responsibility of prisoner abuse by writing the controversial legal opinions. On April 27, 2007, Germany's Federal Prosecutor announced she would not proceed with an investigation. In November 2007, the plaintiffs appealed the decision. On April 21, 2009, the Stuttgart Regional Appeals Court dismissed the appeal.

On March 28, 2009, a Spanish court, headed by Baltasar Garzón, the judge who ordered the arrest of former Chilean President Augusto Pinochet, announced it would begin an investigation into whether or not Gonzales, and five other former Bush Justice and Defense officials violated international law by providing the Bush Administration a legal framework and basis for the torture of detainees at Guantanamo Bay. Garzón said that it was "highly probable" the matter would go to court and that arrest warrants would be issued. Also named in the Spanish court's investigation are John Yoo, Douglas Feith, William Haynes II, Jay Bybee, and David Addington. In April 2010, on the advice of the Spanish Attorney General Cándido Conde-Pumpido, who believes that an American tribunal should judge the case (or dismiss it) before a Spanish Court ever thinks about becoming involved, prosecutors recommended that Judge Garzon should drop his investigation. As CNN reported, Mr. Conde-Pumpido told reporters that Judge Garzon's plan threatened to turn the court "into a toy in the hands of people who are trying to do a political action".

== Texas Supreme Court opinions ==
This is a list of opinions in which Alberto Gonzales wrote the majority court opinion, wrote a concurring opinion, or wrote a dissent. Cases in which he joined in an opinion written by another justice are not included. A justice "writes" an opinion if the justice has primary responsibility for the opinion. Justices are assisted by a law clerk who may play an important role in the actual analysis of legal issues and drafting of the opinion. The Texas Supreme Court issued 84 opinions during Gonzales's tenure on the court, according to LexisNexis.

=== Majority opinions ===
- Fitzgerald v. Advanced Spine Fixation Systems, 996 S.W.2d 864 (Tex. 1999).
- Texas Farmers Insurance Company v. Murphy, 996 S.W.2d 873 (Tex. 1999).
- Mid-Century Insurance Company v. Kidd, 997 S.W.2d 265 (Tex. 1999).
- General Motors Corporation v. Sanchez, 997 S.W.2d 584 (Tex. 1999).
- In re Missouri Pac. R.R. Co., 998 S.W.2d 212 (Tex. 1999).
- Mallios v. Baker, 11 S.W.3d 157 (Tex. 2000).
- Gulf Insurance Company v. Burns Motors, 22 S.W.3d 417 (Tex. 2000).
- Southwestern Refining Co. v. Bernal, 22 S.W.3d 425 (Tex. 2000).
- Golden Eagle Archery, Inc. v. Jackson, 24 S.W.3d 362 (Tex. 2000).
- City of Fort Worth v. Zimlich, 29 S.W.3d 62 (Tex. 2000).
- Prudential Insurance Company of America v. Financial Review Services, Inc., 29 S.W.3d 74 (Tex. 2000).
- Texas Department of Transportation v. Able, 35 S.W.3d 608 (Tex. 2000).
- Pustejovsky v. Rapid-American Corp., 35 S.W.3d 643 (Tex. 2000).
- John G. & Marie Stella Kenedy Memorial Foundation v. Dewhurst, 44 Tex. Sup. J. 268 (2000), withdrawn.

=== Concurring opinions ===
- In re Dallas Morning News, 10 S.W.3d 298 (Tex. 1999).
- Osterberg v. Peca, 12 S.W.3d 31 (Tex. 2000).
- In re Jane Doe 3, 19 S.W.3d 300 (Tex. 2000).
- In re Doe, 19 S.W.3d 346 (Tex. 2000). (This case is popularly referred to as "In re Jane Doe 5".)
- Grapevine Excavation, Inc. v. Maryland Lloyds, 35 S.W.3d 1 (Tex. 2000).

=== Partial dissent, partial concurrence ===
- Lopez v. Munoz, Hockema, & Reed, 22 S.W.3d 857 (Tex. 2000)

== See also ==
- George W. Bush Supreme Court candidates

Political offices
Preceded by Tony Garza	Secretary of State of Texas; 1998–1999	Succeeded by Elton Bomer
Legal offices
Preceded by Raul Gonzalez	Associate Justice of the Texas Supreme Court; 1999–2001	Succeeded by Wallace Jefferson
Preceded by Beth Nolan	White House Counsel; 2001–2005	Succeeded by Harriet Miers
Preceded by John Ashcroft	United States Attorney General; 2005–2007	Succeeded by Michael Mukasey
U.S. order of precedence (ceremonial)
Preceded by Jim Nicholson as Former U.S. Cabinet Member	Order of precedence of the United States as Former U.S. Cabinet Member	Succeeded by Carlos Gutierrez as Former U.S. Cabinet Member
