= Raul A. Gonzalez =

American judge (born 1940)

Raul A. Gonzalez (born March 22, 1940) was a justice of the Supreme Court of Texas from October 8, 1984 to December 31, 1998. A Democrat, Gonzalez was appointed to the court by Governor Mark White in 1984 to replace the retiring Justice Charles Barrow. He was subsequently elected in 1986, 1988, and 1994. He retired in 1999 and was replaced by Alberto Gonzales.

Political offices
Preceded by Charles Barrow	Justice of the Texas Supreme Court; 1984–1998	Succeeded by Alberto Gonzales
