= Timeline of the investigation into the 2012 Benghazi attack =

2012 Benghazi attack
- Location: Benghazi, Libya
- Date: September 11–12, 2012; 22:00 – 02:00 EET (UTC+02:00)
- Target: United States consulate and second location (annex)
- Attack type: Armed assault, rioting, arson
- Deaths: 4 (including U.S. Ambassador J. Christopher Stevens)
- Injuries: 10

The timeline below details the ongoing investigation into the September 11, 2012 attack upon the American diplomatic mission at Benghazi, in Libya. The attack and the investigation are the subject of much controversy in the American political sphere.

== Timeline ==
=== September 2012 ===
September 12	The New York Times reported: "American and European officials said that while many details about the attack remained unclear, the assailants seemed organized, well trained and heavily armed, and they appeared to have at least some level of advance planning." The article also noted that a senior Obama administration official told reporters that "it was clearly a complex attack," but provided no details. CBS News reported that Wanis al-Sharef (also spelled al-Sharif), a Libyan Interior Ministry official in Benghazi, said that an angry mob had gathered outside the consulate to protest a U.S.-made film that schedule ridiculed the Islamic prophet Muhammad. According to al-Sharef, the mob stormed the consulate after the U.S. troops who responded fired rounds into the air to try and disperse the crowd. CBS News later reported that U.S. officials said the attack was not an out-of-control demonstration as first suspected, but a well-executed assault. From the wording of the report it is unclear whether the protesters were a group distinct from the attackers or were the attackers themselves. The Guardian published a video interview of a local Libyan on the consulate compound right after the attack, who presumed and empathized that the attack was in response to the anti-Islamic film. The Washington Post reported that U.S. officials and Middle East analysts said that the attack "may have been planned by extremists and inspired by al-Qaeda." In a press release, the Qulliam Foundation, a counter-extremism think tank based in London, stated that the "military assault" was not related to the film but was to "avenge the death of Abu Yahya al-Libi, al-Qaeda's second in command killed a few months ago." BBC reported that Libya's deputy ambassador to London, Ahmad Jibril, named Ansar al-Sharia, also known as Al-Qaeda in the Arabian Peninsula, as the perpetrators. They also said a Libyan reporter told them that the attack was executed by as many as 80 militiamen "armed with assault rifles, rocket-propelled grenades, mortars and 14.5 mm anti-aircraft machine guns." Deputy Interior Minister Wanis al-Sharif of the Libyan government told a news conference in Benghazi that it was likely that the perpetrators had been Gaddafi loyalists, suggesting the attack could have been intended as a revenge for the extradition of Abdullah al-Senoussi (Gaddafi's former intelligence chief) from Mauritania the previous month.
September 13	The FBI opened an investigation into the deaths; a team was sent to investigate, with another team for security. The FBI officials were set to arrive by September 21 in Benghazi to work with Libyan officials. In a briefing to congressional staffers, State Department Under Secretary Patrick Kennedy said that the attack appeared planned because it was so extensive and because of the "proliferation" of small and medium weapons. CNN reported that the attackers were part of an Al Qaeda spinoff group. They spoke with Sen. Dianne Feinstein (D-Calif.), who said the killings were possibly linked to the terrorist group blamed for the 9/11 hijackings. According to Sen. Feinstein, "The weapons were somewhat sophisticated, and they blew a big hole in the building and started a big fire."
September 14	The Senate Armed Services Committee was briefed by Secretary of Defense Leon Panetta about the response to the situation in Libya. Afterwards, Senate Armed Services Chairman Carl Levin (D-MI) was quoted as saying, "I think it was a planned, premeditated attack." He added that he did not know the group responsible for the attack.
September 15	SITE Intelligence Group released a report that said al-Qaeda claimed that the attack was in revenge for the killing of the network's number two Sheikh Abu Yahya al-Libi. Talking points prepared by the CIA, stated "The currently available information suggests that the demonstrations in Benghazi were spontaneously inspired by the protests at the U.S. Embassy in Cairo and evolved into a direct assault against the U.S. Consulate and subsequently its annex. There are indications that extremists participated in the violent demonstrations."
September 16	In an interview with NPR in Benghazi, President Mohammed el-Megarif said that foreigners infiltrated Libya over the past few months, planned the attack, and used Libyans to carry it out. According to el-Megarif: "The idea that this criminal and cowardly act was a spontaneous protest that just spun out of control is completely unfounded and preposterous. We firmly believe that this was a precalculated, preplanned attack that was carried out specifically to attack the U.S. Consulate." He said the attackers used the protesters outside the consulate as a cover, and there is evidence showing that elements of Ansar al-Sharia, an extremist group in eastern Benghazi, were used by foreign citizens with ties to al-Qaida to attack the consulate. U.S. Ambassador to the United Nations Susan Rice appeared on several Sunday morning talk shows and stated, "Putting together the best information that we have available to us today our current assessment is that what happened in Benghazi was in fact initially a spontaneous reaction to what had just transpired hours before in Cairo, almost a copycat of-- of the demonstrations against our facility in Cairo, which were prompted, of course, by the video. What we think then transpired in Benghazi is that opportunistic extremist elements came to the consulate as this was unfolding. They came with heavy weapons which unfortunately are readily available in post revolutionary Libya. And it escalated into a much more violent episode." Senator John McCain (R-AZ), the top Republican on the Senate Armed Services Committee, voiced suspicion that the attack was planned in advance and not prompted by the furor over the film. He noted that "[m]ost people don't bring rocket-propelled grenades and heavy weapons to demonstrations. That was an act of terror."
September 17	Fox News reported that an "intelligence source on the ground in Libya" said "there was no demonstration outside the U.S. Consulate in Benghazi" before the attack. The source was quoted as saying, "There was no protest and the attacks were not spontaneous." The source also said that the attack "was planned and had nothing to do with the movie." The source said the assault came with no warning at about 9:35 p.m. local time and included fire from more than two locations. The information for the time and for multiple directions of the attack corroborates an eyewitness report. Representative Mike Rogers (R) Michigan, the chairman of the House Intelligence Committee, said in an interview with Real Clear Politics that there were reports that the Consulate sustained "indirect fire, artillery type fire from mortars. They had direct unit action. It was coordinated in a way that was very unusual. They repulsed a quick reaction force that came to the facility...."
September 19	The director of the National Counterterrorism Center, Matthew Olson, appeared before the Senate Homeland Security and Governmental Affairs Committee. During the hearing Olsen said that the Americans killed in Libya died "in the course of a terrorist attack." But he said that "the facts that we have now indicate that this was an opportunistic attack," one in which heavily armed militants took advantage of an ongoing demonstration at the Consulate. Sen. Susan Collins (R-Maine) disagreed with Olsen's statement that the attack did not appear pre-planned. She said, "Based on the briefings I have had, I've come to the opposite conclusion. I just don't think that people come to protests equipped with RPGs [rocket-propelled grenades] and other heavy weapons. And the reports of complicity—and they are many—with Libyan guards who were assigned to guard the consulate also suggest to me that this was premeditated." Olsen told committee members that the U.S. is "looking at indications" that some attackers had connections to al-Qaeda or its North African affiliate, al-Qaeda in the Islamic Maghreb. Fox News reported intelligence sources that the attack was tied to Al Qaeda via the involvement of Abu Sufian bin Qumu, a former Guantanamo Bay detainee. However, a US national security official tells Mother Jones that "that report is wrong, there's no intelligence suggesting that he was leading the attack on the consulate that evening."
September 20	Reuters reported that U.S. authorities are investigating the prospect of collusion between the militants who launched the attack on the consulate and locally hired Libyan personnel guarding the facility. This corroborates earlier statements by U.S. government officials who stated there were multiple accounts of collusion between the attackers and the Libyan security guards. Secretary Clinton announced the formation of a panel to investigate the attack, which is separate from the FBI investigation. White House Press Secretary Jay Carney for the first time called the event "a terrorist attack." In the same report CNN noted conflicting reports that U.S. Ambassador to Libya Chris Stevens "believed he was on an al Qaeda hit list."
September 21	U.S. officials said that the heavily armed extremists who laid siege to the consulate used "military-style tactics" in what appeared to be a "sophisticated operation". Intelligence reports indicated that 50 or more people, many of them masked, took part in the attack and used gun trucks and precise mortar fire. Intelligence reports also indicated that the attackers set up a perimeter to control access in and out of the compound.
September 23	A report in The New York Times has stated that there were two facilities used by the Americans in Benghazi, one for the American mission and an annex a half-mile away and that: Neither was heavily guarded, and the annex was never intended to be a "safe house," as initial accounts suggested. Two of the mission's guards — Tyrone S. Woods and Glen A. Doherty, former members of the Navy SEALs — were killed just outside the villa's front gate.
September 25	U.S. Senators John McCain (R-AZ), Lindsey Graham (R-SC), Kelly Ayotte (R-NH) and Ron Johnson (R-WI) sent a letter to U.N. Ambassador Susan Rice seeking clarification on statements she made on the five Sunday talk shows on September 16 that the September 11 attack in Benghazi was the result of a "spontaneous reaction." The senators wrote that the evidence clearly showed the attack was planned and coordinated. Ms. Rice wrote in her reply letter, "I relied solely and squarely on the information the intelligence community provided to me ... This information represented the intelligence community's best, current assessment as of the date of my television appearances." The four senators replied in a statement: "Elements of the intelligence community apparently told the administration within hours of the attack that militants connected with al Qaeda were involved, yet Ambassador Rice claims her comments five days later reflected the 'best' and 'current' assessment of the intelligence community. Either the Obama administration is misleading Congress and the American people, or it is blaming the entire failure on the intelligence community."
September 26	The Daily Beast reported that three separate U.S. intelligence officials knew within 24 hours of the attack that it was "planned and the work of al Qaeda affiliates operating in Eastern Libya." Libyan president Mohamed Magariefd, in an interview with NBC News, said that there were no protestors at the site before the attack and that the anti-Islam film had "nothing to do with" the attack. "Reaction should have been, if it was genuine, should have been six months earlier. So it was postponed until the 11th of September," he said. "They chose this date, 11th of September to carry a certain message." Eight Republican Representatives on the House Armed Services Committee sent a letter to President Obama asking him to provide answers to questions in a classified format. Their letter reads in part: "While we appreciate your willingness to provide the House of Representatives with an interagency briefing last week, many of the members' questions were left unanswered. To that end, we are seeking additional information regarding the intelligence leading up to the attack, the security posture of our embassy, the role former Guantanamo Bay detainees may have played, as well as the way forward in Libya and, indeed, the region."
September 28	A statement released by the Director of Public Affairs for the Director of National Intelligence, Shawn Turner, on the intelligence related to the terrorist attack on the U.S. Consulate in Benghazi, Libya, read in part: "As we learned more about the attack, we revised our initial assessment to reflect new information indicating that it was a deliberate and organized terrorist attack carried out by extremists. It remains unclear if any group or person exercised overall command and control of the attack, and if extremist group leaders directed their members to participate. However, we do assess that some of those involved were linked to groups affiliated with, or sympathetic to al-Qa'ida. We continue to make progress, but there remain many unanswered questions. As more information becomes available our analysis will continue to evolve and we will obtain a more complete understanding of the circumstances surrounding the terrorist attack."

=== October 2012 ===
October 2	In a letter to Secretary of State Clinton, Darrell Issa (R-CA, chairman of the Committee) and Jason Chaffetz (R-UT, chairman of the subcommittee on National Security, Homeland Defense, and Foreign Operations) write that "the attack that claimed the Ambassador's life was the latest in a long line of attacks on Western diplomats and officials in Libya in the months leading up to September 11, 2012. It was clearly never, as Administration officials once insisted, the result of a popular protest." The letter goes on to state that the mission in Benghazi was denied increased security they repeatedly requested. Subpoenaed witnesses set to testify before the committee on October 10 are Charlene Lamb, Deputy Assistant Secretary for International Programs, Bureau of Diplomatic Security, U.S. Department of State; Eric Nordstrom, Regional Security Officer, U.S. Department of State; and Lt. Col. Andrew Wood, Utah National Guard, U.S. Army. According to Lt. Col. Wood, his 16-member team and a six-member State Department elite force called a Mobile Security Deployments team left Libya in August, one month before the assault on the diplomatic mission. Wood says that's despite the fact that U.S. officials in Libya wanted security increased, not decreased.
October 3	The Washington Post reported that the FBI investigation team was in Tripoli and had not reached Benghazi yet.
October 4	The State Department announced an Accountability Review Board "to examine the facts and circumstances of the attacks." The Washington Post reported that the FBI team arrived in Benghazi and left after about 12 hours.
October 5	The House Committee on Oversight and Government Reform is conducting its own investigation of the attack. In doing so, the House Oversight Committee issued a subpoena to LTC Andy Wood.
October 9	In an evening briefing to reporters, the State Department said it never concluded that the consulate attack in Libya stemmed from protests over the video. Senate Foreign Relations Committee member Bob Corker (R-TN) met with Libyan officials in Tripoli, and said that investigators are examining video from security cameras at the primary Benghazi compound to help them reconstruct what happened in the attack and identify attack participants. Senators John McCain (R-AZ), Lindsey Graham (R-SC), Kelly Ayotte (R-NH), and Saxby Chambliss (R-GA) sent letters to Director of National Intelligence James Clapper, CIA Director David Petraeus, and John Brennan, Assistant to the President for Homeland Security and Counterterrorism, asking them to respond to "specific questions regarding the shifting official explanations" about the attack.
October 10	The four witnesses called to testify at the October 10, 2012 hearing of the House Committee on Oversight and Government Reform (l to r) were Lt. Col. Andrew Wood, Utah National Guard, U.S. Army; Eric Nordstrom, Regional Security Officer, U.S. Department of State; Charlene Lamb, Deputy Assistant Secretary for International Programs, Bureau of Diplomatic Security, U.S. Department of State; and Ambassador Patrick Kennedy, Under Secretary for Management, U.S. Department of State. An image of the U.S. compound can be seen behind Ms. Lamb. The House Committee on Oversight and Government Reform held its hearing, "The Security Failures of Benghazi." In addition to the three witnesses originally named, a fourth witness testified: Ambassador Patrick Kennedy, Under Secretary for Management, U.S. Department of State.: In sworn testimony, Mr. Kennedy said, "...if any administration official, including any career official, were on television on Sunday, September 16th, they would have said what Ambassador Rice said. The information she had at that point from the intelligence community is the same that I had at that point." However, in a briefing to congressional staffers on September 13, Mr. Kennedy said that the attack appeared planned. With regard to the so-called "talking points" memo UN Ambassador Susan Rice relied upon for information during television interviews following the Benghazi attack, The Guardian reports that on 16 November 2012, former CIA Director David Petraeus told congressional hearings, references to al-Queda had been removed from the memo. The references were removed so as not to give up information which could compromise classified sources. Rice was unaware of al-Qaida ties to the Benghazi attack.; During testimony State Department witnesses acknowledged that it rejected appeals for more security at its diplomatic posts in Libya in the months before the attack. The "annex" and "safe house" in the second diplomatic compound was inadvertently revealed to be a U.S. intelligence post.; Charlene Lamb, Deputy Assistant Secretary of State for International Programs, said in her prepared testimony that she had a firm grasp on what happened in Benghazi, starting moments after the assault began. "When the attack began, a Diplomatic Security agent working in the tactical operations center immediately ... alerted the annex U.S. quick reaction security team stationed nearby ... and the Diplomatic Security Command Center in Washington. From that point on, I could follow what was happening in almost real-time."; During testimony Representative Issa described the existence of video tape of the attack taken from consulate security cameras; the tape was not available to committee members at the time of the hearing.
October 12	U.S. Senate Committee on Homeland Security and Governmental Affairs announced its plan to conduct a bipartisan investigation. Part of their investigation will seek to determine "why the Administration's initial public assessments of this attack were subsequently proven inaccurate."
October 14	Senator Lindsey Graham (R-SC), speaking on CBS' Face the Nation, said that "[t]he intelligence community on the ground in Libya has told Senator Corker and myself that within twenty-four hours, they communicated up to Washington that this was a terrorist attack."
October 15	U.S. Secretary of State Hillary Rodham Clinton assumed responsibility for the Benghazi attack, saying that she is in charge of her 60,000-plus staff all over the world and "the president and the vice president wouldn't be knowledgeable about specific decisions that are made by security professionals. They're the ones who weigh all of the threats and the risks and the needs and make a considered decision." Republican Senator John McCain praised her "laudable gesture, especially when the White House is trying to avoid any responsibility whatsoever" but insisted that either there were drastic failures in the national security operation in not keeping the president aware of ongoing threats, or Obama himself knew of the threats and needed to take responsibility for the shortcomings. In an interview with the Los Angeles Times, the two Libyan militiamen guarding the consulate denied aiding the attackers. The compound was "lazily quiet" in the hours before the assault, they said. Around 9:30 p.m., the guards heard cries of "Allahu akbar!"—"God is great"—three times from outside the walls, then a voice called out in Arabic "You infidels!" and the attackers raced inside. The New York Times reported that witnesses of the attack knowledgeable of the circumstances were very convinced that it was carried out by a group of local Islamic militants in response to the video. According to local militia leaders familiar with the militant group, it was capable of carrying out the attack on short notice with only a few hours' planning.
October 17	Libyan officials report that the founder of Libya's Islamist militia Ansar al-Sharia was at the compound during the attack, but that he remains free a week after those allegations were disclosed to Libyan political leaders and U.S. investigators. The militia commander, identified as Ahmed Abu Khattalah, is a former political prisoner whose fighters were also blamed for assassinating a senior military officer after he defected to the opposition during last year's revolution against Moammar Kadafi.
October 18	The New York Times reported that Ahmed Abu Khattala, 41, claimed the Benghazi attack had grown out of a peaceful protest against a video made in the United States that mocked Muhammad and Islam. On or about 15 June 2014 American military and law enforcement personnel operating in Libya captured Ahmed Abu Khattala, who had been secretly indicted in the U.S. for his alleged role as a mastermind and/or ring-leader in the Benghazi attack. Senate Committee on Homeland Security & Governmental Affairs made its first request for documents and briefings into the circumstances surrounding the attack. In separate letters to Secretary Hillary Clinton, Director of National Intelligence James Clapper, and Secretary of Defense Leon Panetta, the committee requested a classified briefing for members of the committee. The briefing is to address threat assessments before the attack, security needs, requests for security, description and chronology of the attack, and what the Obama administration knew about the attack in the immediate aftermath and "whether any initial public statements issued by members of the Administration in the days following the attack were inaccurate and, if so, why." Senator Dianne Feinstein (D-CA), chair of the Senate Intelligence Committee, questioned the security at the compound and the initial intelligence surrounding the attack. Feinstein was quoted in an interview: "I think what happened was the director of national intelligence, which we call the DNI, who is a very good individual, the former head of the Defense Intelligence Agency, Gen. Jim Clapper, put out some speaking points on the initial intelligence assessment. I think that was possibly a mistake."
October 19	Oversight and Government Reform Committee Chairman Darrell Issa and National Security Subcommittee Chairman Jason Chaffetz sent a 10-page letter to President Obama, accompanied by 166 pages of unclassified documents and photos. The committee stated that the "letter requests that the White House respond to questions about its role in the controversial decision to have the U.S. diplomatic mission in Libya pursue a course of 'normalization' that was intended to help create the perception of success in Libya and contrast it to U.S. operations in Iraq and Afghanistan." Representative Peter T. King (R-NY), Chairman of the House Committee on Homeland Security, sent a letter to President Obama requesting him to release Intelligence Community (1) reporting that led Obama Administration officials to initially characterize the assault as a "spontaneous reaction" to a film and (2) data and intelligence that led the Administration to change its characterization from a "spontaneous reaction" to a "terrorist attack." Senators John McCain (R-AZ), Lindsey Graham (R-SC), and Kelly Ayotte (R-NH) renewed their request from 10 days ago that Director of National Intelligence James Clapper, CIA Director David Petraeus and John Brennan, Assistant to the President for Homeland Security and Counterterrorism, answer questions regarding "the shifting official explanations surrounding" the attack. The senators wrote, "Our questions should not be hard to answer, and the American people have a right to learn what our intelligence communities knew about the events of September 11, 2012, and when they knew it." U.S. officials told The Associated Press that the CIA station chief in Libya compiled intelligence reports within 24 hours of the attack that indicated there was evidence it was carried out by militants, using the pretext of demonstrations against U.S. facilities in Egypt against the film to cover their intent. The report from the station chief was written late Wednesday, Sept. 12, and reached intelligence agencies in Washington the next day. It was not clear how widely the information was circulated.
October 20	The Washington Post reported that talking points prepared by the CIA on Sept. 15 stated: "The currently available information suggests that the demonstrations in Benghazi were spontaneously inspired by the protests at the U.S. Embassy in Cairo and evolved into a direct assault against the U.S. Consulate and subsequently its annex. There are indications that extremists participated in the violent demonstrations." CBS News reported Congress members have asked why military assistance was not sent. General Dempsey and Secretary Panetta "looked at available options, and the ones we exercised had our military forces arrive in less than 24 hours, well ahead of timelines laid out in established policies." An unmanned Predator drone was sent to Benghazi, and the drone observed the final hours of the attack. The Pentagon said it moved a team of special operators from central Europe to Naval Air Station Sigonella; other nearby military forces available were fighter jets and AC-130 gunships. Gary Berntsen stated, "They made zero adjustments in this. They stood and they watched and our people died."
October 22	The New York Times reported that Ms. Rice, the US ambassador to the UN, "has said that the judgments she offered on the five talk shows on Sept. 16 came from talking points prepared by the C.I.A., which reckoned that the attack that killed Ambassador J. Christopher Stevens and three other Americans had resulted from a spontaneous mob that was angry about an anti-Islamic video that had set off protests elsewhere. That assessment, described to Ms. Rice in briefings the day before her television appearances, was based on intercepted communications, informants' tips and Libyan press reports, officials said."
October 23	Media reports indicate that the State Department's Operations Center sent a "Sensitive but unclassified" email at 4:05 p.m. Washington time (10:05 p.m. Benghazi time) on September 11 titled "U.S. Diplomatic Mission in Benghazi Under Attack" to the White House Situation Room and other U.S. security units and two hours later sent an email titled "Update 2: Ansar al-Sharia Claims Responsibility for Benghazi Attack." The first email reads in part: "approximately 20 armed people fired shots; explosions have been heard as well. Ambassador Stevens, who is currently in Benghazi, and four COM (Chief of Mission/embassy) personnel are in the compound safe haven." Secretary of State Hillary Rodham Clinton cautioned that those emails are "not in and of itself evidence" that the administration had definitively assessed the assault as a terrorist attack from the beginning. A Tunisian man who was arrested in Turkey earlier this month with reported links to the Benghazi attack has been returned to Tunisia and is facing terrorism charges.
October 24	It is reported that both Reuters and Fox News obtained copies of an email sent about 2 hours after the attack in which the White House, Pentagon, and other agencies are told that the Islamist militant group Ansar al-Sharia had "claimed responsibility."
October 25	A suspected Al-Qaeda member who was believed to have been involved in the Consulate attack was shot dead by Egyptian police, after they received a tip that he was staying in an apartment in Madinat Nasr. Egyptian police also arrested a seven-member cell in Cairo, five of whom are Libyans and the other two Egyptians.
October 26	Republican Senators John McCain, Lindsey Graham, and Kelly Ayotte wrote to Defense Secretary Leon Panetta, CIA Director David Petraeus, and Attorney General Eric Holder requesting they make public the surveillance video taken at the consulate during the attack. Fox News reported that military back-up was denied by the CIA chain of command, and the annex was instructed twice to "stand down". Woods, and two others, ignored those instructions and evacuated the consulate. Upon returning to the annex, and after beginning to taking fire, the annex requested fire support as they had a laser targeted on the mortar team that was attacking them. A CIA spokeswoman, Jennifer Youngblood, denied the claims.
October 27	The Associated Press published a timeline of the comments by the administration and Libyan officials regarding the Benghazi attack, as well as Libyan witnesses account. The AP article noted that a witness said he militants before the attack gathering around 20 youths from nearby to chant against the anti-Islam film. The article reports that American officials suggest it was a planned militant assault and that the attackers may have used the film controversy as a cover for the attack.
October 31	Former House Speaker Newt Gingrich suggested that "at least two networks have emails from the National Security Adviser's office telling a counterterrorism group to stand down" in assisting the besieged U.S. consulate in Benghazi. Fox News reported that a cable marked "SECRET" and addressed to the Office of the Secretary of State Hillary Clinton summarized an "emergency meeting" convened by the U.S. Mission in Benghazi on August 15, 2012. In the meeting the State Department's regional security officer "expressed concerns with the ability to defend Post in the event of a coordinated attack due to limited manpower, security measures, weapons capabilities, host nation support, and the overall size of the compound." According to Fox News, "The details in the cable seemed to foreshadow the deadly Sept. 11 attack on the U.S. compound, which was a coordinated, commando-style assault using direct and indirect fire. Al Qaeda in North Africa and Ansar al-Sharia, both mentioned in the cable, have since been implicated in the consulate attack."

=== November 2012 ===
November 1	CBS News reported that during the attack the Obama administration did not convene its top interagency counterterrorism resource: the Counterterrorism Security Group, (CSG). A high-ranking government official was quoted: "The CSG is the one group that's supposed to know what resources every agency has. They know of multiple options and have the ability to coordinate counterterrorism assets across all the agencies. They were not allowed to do their job. They were not called upon." The article goes on to state that counterterrorism sources and internal emails reviewed by CBS News expressed frustration that key responders were ready to deploy but were not called upon to help in the attack. Documents found by reporters for the American magazine Foreign Policy on Oct. 26 amid the wreckage of the U.S. consulate indicate there was concern about security at the compound. One letter dated Sept. 11 and addressed to Mohamed Obeidi, the head of the Libyan Ministry of Foreign Affairs' office in Benghazi, reads in part: "Finally, early this morning at 0643, September 11, 2012, one of our diligent guards made a troubling report. Near our main gate, a member of the police force was seen in the upper level of a building across from our compound. It is reported that this person was photographing the inside of the U.S. special mission and furthermore that this person was part of the police unit sent to protect the mission." The article states that this accords with a message written by Smith, the IT officer who was killed in the assault, on a gaming forum on Sept. 11. "Assuming we don't die tonight. We saw one of our 'police' that guard the compound taking pictures," he wrote hours before the assault. Washington Post published a detailed CIA timeline of the attack described by a senior intelligence official.
November 2	Fifty-three members of the House of Representatives sent a letter to President Obama and Secretary Clinton requesting responses to oversight questions, including questions on the president's Daily Brief, how the State Department designated the Benghazi compound (and how it affected security requirements), contradictions in the administration's public statements of the attack as a deliberate terrorist attack or a spontaneous protest, and discrepancies between danger pay increases for mission personnel but denial for additional security. Senior U.S. intelligence officials acknowledged that Woods and Doherty were contracted by the Central Intelligence Agency, not the State Department as originally publicly identified. Fox News reported that U.S. military intelligence informed senior commanders as early as 7 p.m. ET (that is, less than 4 hours after the attack began) that Ansar al-Sharia carried out the attack. The intelligence was relayed with no caveats, according to a source familiar with the intelligence. The Pentagon said that two U.S. service members volunteered to join the CIA team that travelled from Tripoli to Benghazi on the rescue mission.
November 3	U.S. Senators John McCain (R-AZ), Lindsey Graham (R-SC) and Kelly Ayotte (R-NH) urged the immediate creation of a temporary Select Committee to investigate the Benghazi attack. Fox News reported that the Blue Mountain Security manager (who was in charge of the local force hired to guard the consulate perimeter) made calls on both two-way radios and cell phones to colleagues in Benghazi warning of problems at least an hour earlier than the attack. Allegedly, those calls were to local security contractors, who say that the annex was also notified much earlier than 9:40 p.m., when the attack started. U.S. military intelligence also said that armed militias were gathering up to 3 hours before the attack.
November 9	David H. Petraeus resigned his position as CIA Director and admitted to having an extramarital affair; he was scheduled to testify before Congress the week of November 12 on the Benghazi attack. As of then it was not clear that General Petraeus would have to testify, and whether he would be disposed to do so if requested or required by Congress, though Senator Dianne Feinstein, D-CA, Chair of the Senate Intelligence Committee, indicated that the Congress would need to interview him. On Wednesday, November 14, 2012, it was made known that he had agreed to testify the following day, Thursday, November 15.
November 10	The Department of Defense released a press release stating they released a detailed timeline yesterday of the Pentagon's response to the attack.
November 12	Paula Broadwell gave a talk on October 26 at the University of Denver in which she revealed that the CIA annex was used to imprison Libyan militia members. In the same speech, Broadwell speculated that this may have been the motivation behind the attack on the consulate. A Fox News Source confirmed to them that the CIA Annex was used as a detention center for not just militia members, but for prisoners from all parts of Northern Africa and the Middle East. The CIA has denied these allegations.
November 15	U.S. intelligence and counter-terrorism officials testified in congressional public and closed hearings today. CNN reported that legislators saw "real-time film (showing) exactly what happened", starting before the attack began up "through the incident and the exodus," according to Sen. Dianne Feinstein. The video was reported to be from "a combination of video from a surveillance camera and a drone."
November 16	Former CIA Director David Petraeus testified in closed hearings to both congressional intelligence committees. Speaking with reporters after the hearing, Representative Peter T. King (R-NY), Chairman of the House Committee on Homeland Security, said that Petraeus testified that he knew that the attack was a terrorist attack linked to al-Qaeda affiliates and not sparked by a protest over an anti-Islam video, as White House officials and President Obama had said for days afterwards. "The original talking points put out by the CIA were different from what was later put out," King said. "Petraeus says his initial assessment was from the start it was a terrorist attack." King said a CIA analyst specifically told lawmakers that the al-Qaeda affiliates line "was taken out." Other House members in attendance at the hearing said that Petraeus made clear that the modifications of the original talking points were not done for political reasons. Petraeus "was adamant there was no politicization of the process, no White House interference or political agenda," said Rep. Adam Schiff (D-CA). "He completely debunked that idea." Regarding Ambassador Susan Rice's comments during television interviews after the attack, Schiff went on to say that the, according to Petraeus, the comments "reflected the best intelligence at the time that could be released publicly". "There was an interagency process to draft it, not a political process," Schiff said. "They came up with the best assessment without compromising classified information or source or methods. So changes were made to protect classified information." According to Petraeus's statements during the hearing, administration officials were concerned that, by publicly disclosing the involvement of Al Qaeda affiliates and sympathizers in the attack, those groups would be tipped off that US government agencies were aware of their involvement. The Washington Post reported that, since the attack, the CIA and other intelligence analysts have settled on a hybrid view of the attack, suggesting that the Cairo protest sparked militants in Libya, who quickly mobilized the assault on U.S. facilities in Benghazi. Details about possible al-Qaeda links were not in initial talking points used by both Petraeus and UN Ambassador Susan Rice because they were preliminary and based on classified sources, intelligence officials said.
November 20	CBS News reported that the Office of the Director of National Intelligence (DNI) cut specific references to "al Qaeda" and "terrorism" from the unclassified talking points given to Ambassador Susan Rice on the attack, with the agreement of the CIA and FBI.
November 27	In a White House press briefing to reporters, Press Secretary Jay Carney told reporters: "There was no protest outside the Benghazi facility. To this day, it is the assessment of this administration and of our intelligence community and certainly the assessment of your colleagues and the press who have interviewed participants on the ground in the assault on our facilities in Benghazi that they acted at least in part in response to what they saw happening in Cairo and took advantage of that situation." U.S. Ambassador to the UN Susan Rice testified for about an hour in a closed session with Republican Senators John McCain, Lindsey Graham, and Kelly Ayotte. McCain told reporters after the meeting: "We are significantly troubled by many of the answers that we got, and some that we didn't get, concerning evidence that was overwhelming leading up to the attack on our consulate.... It is clear that the information that she gave the American people was incorrect when she said that it was a spontaneous demonstration triggered by a hateful video." Rice later issued a statement saying: "We explained that the talking points provided by the intelligence community, and the initial assessment upon which they were based, were incorrect in a key respect: there was no protest or demonstration in Benghazi.... While, we certainly wish that we had had perfect information just days after the terrorist attack, as is often the case, the intelligence assessment has evolved."

=== December 2012 ===
December 7	The House Committee on Foreign Affairs announced that Secretary of State Hillary Clinton will testify, as early as next week, at an open hearing on the Benghazi attack.
December 15	Hillary Clinton faints and suffers a concussion. As a result, her aides announce that they no longer expect her to testify at the hearing on the Benghazi attack.
December 18	An independent inquiry into the attack sharply criticises State Department officials in Washington for ignoring requests for more guards and safety upgrades, and for failing to adapt security procedures to a deteriorating security environment.
December 31	A bipartisan Senate Homeland Security Committee report faults the State Department and Pentagon for providing inadequate protection to the U.S. Consulate. It also criticized the Obama Administration's handling of the attack.

=== January 2013 ===
January 23	Hillary Clinton testifies before Congress on the subject of the attack. She decries the "politicization" of incident, and defends the State Department. Noteworthy highlights from her testimony include her comment, "What difference, at this point, does it make?" in response to questions about why the Benghazi attack occurred and how the controversial talking points were created. She also stated, in response to Senator Rand Paul's question about the U.S. transferring weapons to Turkey from Libya, "I do not know. I don't have any information on that," further stating, "you'll have to direct that question to the agency that ran the annex."

=== February 2013 ===
February 07	Leon Panetta and Martin Dempsey testify before Senate Armed Services Committee on the subject of the attack. Under questioning by Lindsey Graham, Panetta and Dempsey said that they both only talked to President Obama one time on the day of the attack.
February 18	The United States has been denied access to individuals who were detained after a raid in the Nasr City neighborhood of Cairo by Egyptian officials. One of these individuals is Muhammad Jamal al Kashef, who is suspected of establishing training camps where attackers of the Benghazi consulate and CIA annex had trained.

=== April 2013 ===
April 23	House Republicans released a report on the Benghazi attack that was highly critical of the White House and the State Department; the White House dismissed the report, and House Democrats called the report biased. Among dozens of findings, the report states that: "Senior State Department officials knew that the threat environment in Benghazi was high and that the Benghazi compound was vulnerable and unable to withstand an attack, yet the department continued to systematically withdraw security personnel"; The "[Obama] Administration willfully perpetuated a deliberately misleading and incomplete narrative that the attacks evolved from a political demonstration caused by a YouTube video."; "... after a White House Deputies Meeting on Saturday, September 15, 2012, the Administration altered the talking points to remove references to the likely participation of Islamic extremists in the attacks. The Administration also removed references to the threat of extremists linked to al-Qa'ida in Benghazi and eastern Libya...."; "The Administration deflected responsibility by blaming the IC [intelligence community] for the information it communicated to the public in both the talking points and the subsequent narrative it perpetuated."

=== May 2013 ===
May 8	Gregory Hicks, Eric Nordstrom, and Mark Thompson testify before the United States House Committee on Oversight and Government Reform, and were called "whistleblowers" by the committee chairman. Hicks testified that more assistance from the U.S. military could have been provided, that attempts to send additional forces were told to stand down by another authority, and he was demoted for telling his recollection of events; the Defense Department disputed Hicks' testimony, and the State Department did not respond. Hicks further stated that since the Libyan government had called the attack a terrorist attack, and the United States did not, complicated the FBI investigation. Thompson testified that a Foreign Emergency Support Team was not sent due to instructions from the State Department, which the State Department said would have taken too long to be effective; Nordstrom criticized the Accountability Review Board, that it did not look into decisions made by those individuals in higher authority. Furthermore, they testified that their previous attempts to increase security leading up to the attacks were denied. Democrats charged that the Republicans were politicizing the investigation.

=== August 2013 ===
August 06	The United States Department of Justice filed the first criminal charges in the Benghazi attack against Ahmed Abu Khattala, leader of a Libyan militia. The charges were sealed and their exact nature wasn't clear, nor was the number of suspects named in the case. The Justice Department declined to comment on specific charges.

=== 2014 ===
May 8	House voted 232–186 to establish the United States House Select Committee on Benghazi, with 225 Republicans and 7 Democrats in favor, and 186 Democrats voting against.

=== 2015 ===
May 8	House Select Committee chairman Trey Gowdy releases a 15-page "interim progress report."
June 16	House Select Committee deposition of Clinton aide Sidney Blumenthal about State Department emails sent on Secretary Clinton's private email server, linking the Benghazi controversy to the Hillary Clinton email controversy.
October 22	Clinton testifies for a second time before the Benghazi Committee and answers questions from committee members in a session beginning at 10 a.m. and lasting until 9 p.m.

=== 2016 ===
July 8	House Select Committee votes to make its proposed report on the Benghazi attack final.
December 7	House Select Committee Final Report officially published with the Government Publishing Office
