= Belmont University College of Law =

Law school in Nashville, Tennessee

Coordinates: 36.13442°N 86.79257°W

- Parent school: Belmont University
- Established: 2011; 15 years ago
- School type: Private
- Dean: Deborah Farringer (beginning Fall 2026)
- Location: Nashville, Tennessee, US
- Enrollment: 372
- USNWR ranking: 85th (2026)
- Bar pass rate: 96.49% (2025 first-time takers)
- Website: www.belmont.edu/law
- ABA profile: Belmont Law

Belmont University College of Law is the law school of Belmont University, a private Christian university in Nashville, Tennessee. Founded in 2011, the College of Law was accredited by the American Bar Association in 2013.

== History ==
Belmont University announced plans for the College of Law in 2009, with the first class beginning in 2011. Belmont Law was accredited by the American Bar Association in 2013, making it the first new accredited law program in Tennessee in more than 50 years and the first new law school in Middle Tennessee in nearly 100 years. Belmont Law achieved American Bar Association accreditation in the earliest possible time allowed by accreditation guidelines.

== Admissions ==
For the class entering in 2025, the college accepted 503 out of 1,337 applicants, a 37.62% acceptance rate, with 136 of those accepted enrolling, a 27.04% yield rate (the percentage of accepted students who enrolled). The median LSAT reported score was 161 and the median undergraduate GPA was 3.84. Seven students were not included in the LSAT calculation. The 25th/75th percentile of reported LSAT scores and of GPAs were 158/163 and 3.66/3.94.

== Curriculum ==
The college's curriculum includes the Juris Doctor (J.D.) with specialized certificate programs available in Criminal Law, Health Law, and Entertainment Law. The College of Law curriculum focuses on creating practice-ready attorneys with a practicum requirement in each semester to help students become proficient in the "practice" of law. These practicums give instruction in all aspects of the practice of law, such as legal writing, legal research, client interviewing, document drafting, litigation, negotiation, and more.

In 2017, a dual JD/MBA program was launched, allowing students to take classes for both degrees concurrently and complete requirements for both degrees within three years.

== Facilities ==
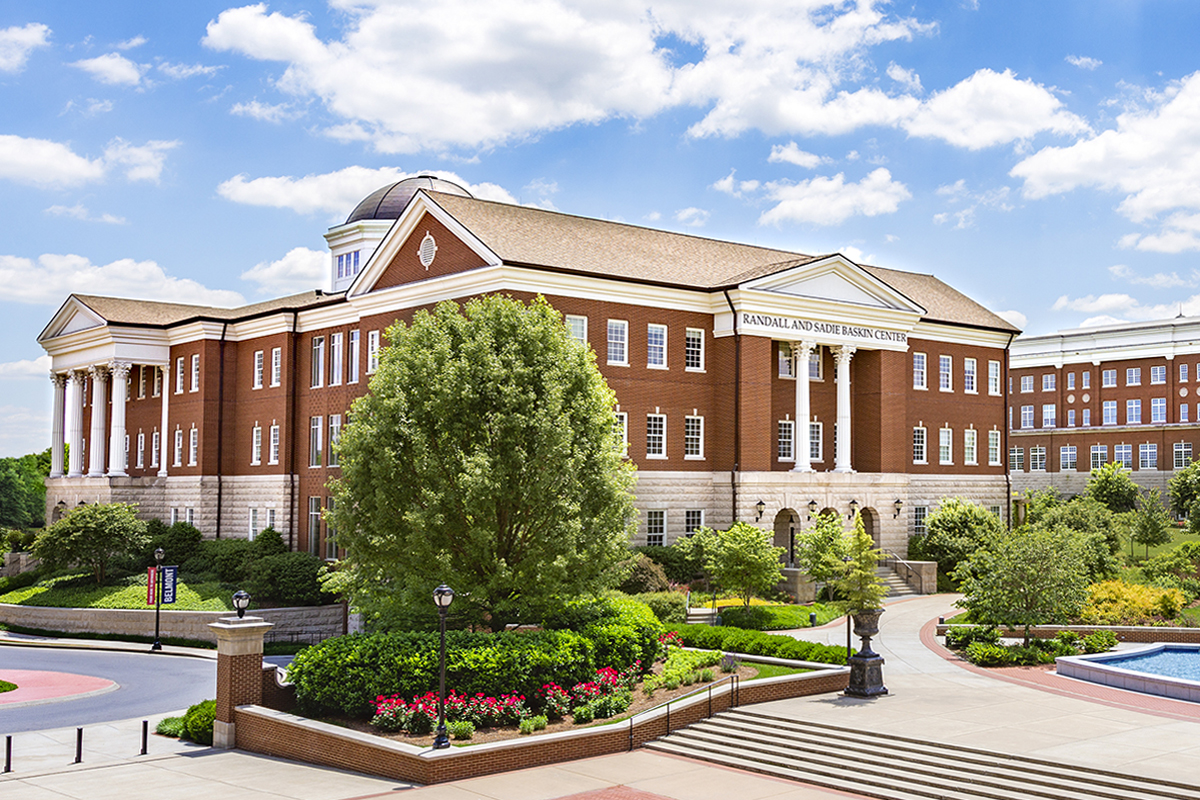
College is in the Belmont Baskin Center

The law school is located in the Randall and Sadie Baskin Center building, a 75,000-square-foot LEED Gold building atop a five-level underground garage. The Randall and Sadie Baskin Center houses more than a dozen large classrooms, a trial courtroom, an appellate court room, faculty offices, student commons, and a two-story law library.

== Organizations and publications ==
Students can participate in local and national competitions through the Board of Advocates program, which includes mock-trial, moot-court, and transactional teams. The moot-court team has won numerous competitions, including: National Champions of the 17th Annual Emory Civil Rights and Liberties Moot Court Competition, 2017, 2023 Regional Champions of the American Bar Association’s (ABA) National Appellate Advocacy Competition, National Champions of the 2018 Emory Civil Rights and Liberties Moot Court Competition.

The College of Law publishes two academic journals, the Belmont Law Review and the Belmont Law Journal (Dean Deborah Farringer merged the Criminal Law Journal, Entertainment Law Journal, and Health Law Journal into a single journal in the Summer of 2023.)

== Employment ==
Statistics for the class of 2018 indicate 96% of students are employed in some capacity, with 95% employed in bar-passage-required or J.D.–advantage positions. Most graduates remain in state, with 89% employed in Tennessee. Of those employed, 63% work at a law firm, 14.5% work in business or industry, 18.5% work in government or judicial clerkships, and 4% work in public interest.

Belmont Law's Law School Transparency under-employment score is 6.4%, which reflects the percentage of the Class of 2018 that is unemployed, pursuing an additional degree, or working in a nonprofessional, short-term, or part-time job nine months after graduation.

== Bar passage ==
On the July 2019 bar exam, 97.18% of Belmont Law's first-time test takers and 94.52% of its total takers passed, the highest of any law school in Tennessee and 23.62% higher than Tennessee's 70.90% pass rate. In 2018, 94.52% of Belmont Law's first-time test takers and 90.79% of its total takers passed the bar exam, ranking 12th in the nation and 2nd in the state of Tennessee for bar passage. Belmont's success has been attributed to the bar preparation course created by Jeff Kinsler, Belmont Law's founding Dean.

In 2023, the bar passage rate for first time test-takers was 93.4%, ranking 1st out of 5 programs in Tennessee.

TN Bar Passage Statistics for Belmont Law
Exam Date	1st Time Pass Rate	Total Pass Rate
July, 2024	94.79%	92.93%
July, 2023	93.41%	90.43%
July, 2022	86.60%	86.87%
July, 2021	88.75%	85.71%
July (October), 2020	82.56%	81.82%
July, 2019	94.52%	97.18%

Bar Pass Outcomes Within Two Years of Graduation
Graduation Year	Total Pass Rate
2021	95.65%
2020	94.95%
2019	100.00%
2018	100.00%
2017	94.74%
2016	94.29%
2015	96.51%

== Costs ==
Tuition for the 2022-2023 school year is $48,660, with 49% of students receiving scholarships. Belmont Law ranks #104 in terms of highest tuition among full-time law students based on 283 tuition rates from 194 law schools, with in-state tuition counting separately.
