= Charles Barrow =

American judge

Charles Wallace Barrow (September 22, 1921 – June 25, 2006) was a justice of the Texas Supreme Court and a Dean of Baylor University Law School.

== Early career ==
Barrow was born in Poteet, Texas and graduated from Baylor Law School in 1943 and joined the U.S. Navy. He served in both the Pacific and European Theaters, participating in the Normandy Landings. He left the Navy having earned seven Service stars. Barrow practiced law in San Antonio until he was recalled to active duty for the Korean War, after which he returned to his law practice. He remained in the Naval Reserve until 1976 when he retired a full Captain.

== Judicial career ==
In 1959, Barrow was appointed as judge of the 45th District Court in Texas. In 1962, both his parents were killed in a car accident and Barrow was elected to replace his father, who, at the time of his death had been an Associate Chief Justice of the Fourth Court of Appeals. He later went on to be elected Chief Justice, a position he held until 1977. In July 1977, Governor Dolph Briscoe appointed Barrow to the Texas Supreme Court (place 4). He was elected in 1978 and re-elected in 1982. In September 1984, he resigned to return to Baylor.

== Baylor and later ==
On 1 October 1984, Barrow assumed the position of Dean of his alma mater, Baylor Law School, a post he held for seven years. During his tenure he increased Baylor's endowment and enhanced its teaching staff. In 1991, he returned to his ranch near San Antonio and served part-time as a Senior District Judge of Bexar and surrounding counties until his retirement in 1996.

Charles Barrow died in San Antonio aged 84. He was survived by three sons and his wife of 62 years Sugie.
