= Prepared testimony =

Testimony ahead of time

Prepared testimony is a form of testimony which is prepared ahead of time, and is then presented verbally or in writing. It is attested as true by the author(s), or given under oath. Typically it is given to a large body or organization. Questions may be posed to the attestor or witness, but the forum where the testimony is given may not permit this, or it may be impractical, or questioning may be cast implicitly in the form of further testimony by others.

This form of testimony has been common in parliamentary or Congressional hearings. It has also been reported in Administrative law hearings.
