= List of people granted executive clemency by Donald Trump =

List of people granted executive clemency by Donald Trump may refer to:

- List of people granted executive clemency in the first Trump presidency
- List of people granted executive clemency in the second Trump presidency
