= Murder of Wallie Howard Jr. =

1990 murder in Syracuse, New York, U.S.

Wallie Howard
- Born: Wallie Howard Jr. April 23, 1959; Syracuse, New York, U.S.
- Died: October 30, 1990 (aged 31); Syracuse, New York, U.S.
- Cause of death: Gunshot wound

On October 30, 1990, Syracuse police officer Wallie Howard Jr. was murdered in Syracuse, New York, during a botched robbery that took place during a drug deal gone wrong. Howard, who was working undercover as a narcotics investigator, was waiting in a vehicle in a parking lot to buy four pounds of cocaine when two drug dealers approached him. One of them, 16-year-old Robert "Bam Bam" Lawrence, fatally shot Howard in the side of the head. It was later discovered that a man named Jaime Davidson had planned the robbery to target a rival drug dealer. Both Lawrence and Davidson were sentenced to life in prison for Howard's murder. In 2014, Lawrence's life sentence was reduced to 31 years following a U.S. Supreme Court ruling that held mandatory life sentences without the possibility of parole for juvenile offenders unconstitutional. In October 2020, Lawrence was released from prison two days before the 30th anniversary of Howard's murder.

The case received renewed attention and controversy in 2021 when President Donald Trump commuted Davidson's life sentence on the final day of his first presidency. The decision was met with outrage by Howard's family, the Syracuse Police Department, and the prosecutors who tried Davidson. In total, Trump granted clemency to 143 people, with Davidson being the only one convicted of murder. Further controversy arose in 2024 when it was revealed that Davidson had since been charged with beating and strangling his wife. In May 2024, Davidson was convicted of misdemeanor domestic battery and sentenced to three months in jail. Assistant U.S. Attorney John Duncan has since pointed out that, while both Davidson and Lawrence have been released from prison, the three accomplices, who neither pulled the trigger nor ran the drug ring, remain in jail for life.

Howard was the first Syracuse police officer to be killed in the line of duty since 1929. Since 1994, the DEA and FBI have used a reenactment video of Howard's murder for agent training.

== Victim ==
Wallie Howard Jr. was born on April 23, 1959, at Syracuse Memorial Hospital in Syracuse, New York, to Wallie Howard Sr. and Delores Howard. He was the second of four children and was nicknamed "Junie" by his mother, a name derived from "Junior", that stayed with him throughout his life. Howard graduated from Henninger High School and later attended Syracuse University. In January 1982, he left school and joined the Syracuse Police Department. In 1985, his older sister Stephanie died at the age of 27 from kidney disease.

In April 1990, Deputy Police Chief Herman Edge, who Howard considered his mentor, died from a heart attack. Two months later, Howard's second child, Najee, died at the age of 3 months from sudden infant death syndrome. At the time of Howard's death, he lived with Cynthia Boggs, who was his partner of 10 years and the mother of his two children, 7-year-old Wallie III and his infant daughter, 5-month-old Cyntia.

== Murder ==
On October 30, 1990, at approximately 2:20 p.m. in Syracuse, New York, Howard sat in a car in the parking lot of Mario's Foodmarket, waiting to purchase four pounds of cocaine from drug dealers he had arranged to meet. Members of the Central New York Drug Enforcement Task Force had been alerted to the situation and were stationed nearby, ready to arrest the dealers after the transaction. Howard had been a police officer for nine years, the last three of which he spent as an undercover drug investigator.

As he waited, a car with three men inside approached. Two of the men, 26-year-old Anthony Stewart and 16-year-old Robert "Bam Bam" Lawrence, got out and walked toward him. Stewart entered Howard's car and sat in the driver's seat beside him. Howard quickly sensed something was wrong when he noticed their weapons. As Stewart exited the car, Howard reached for his gun and shot Stewart once in the back as he tried to flee. Lawrence then fired a shot at Howard, hitting him in the left side of his head.

After being shot, Stewart dropped his weapon and limped toward the supermarket before collapsing. Lawrence returned to the getaway vehicle, and he, along with the driver, 21-year-old Juan Morales, fled the scene. Meanwhile, Howard fell out of his car and collapsed on the ground. Moments later, officers rushed to his car and found him unconscious. About half a block away, police stopped the vehicle Morales and Lawrence were fleeing in and arrested them. Stewart was also arrested at the scene in the parking lot. Howard was rushed to University Hospital and placed on life support. At 8:15 p.m., he succumbed to his injuries and was pronounced dead.

== Aftermath ==
In a police interview, Morales stated that he had been working for a man named Jaime Davidson, whom he identified from a police mugshot. Davidson was arrested the following day in Brooklyn. Morales also identified Lawrence as the triggerman who ultimately shot and killed Howard. A fifth man, Lenworth Parke, who supplied the murder weapon and was considered Davidson's chief lieutenant, was also arrested and charged. All five men were then tried for Howard's murder.

In 1991, Lawrence, Morales, and Stewart were tried and convicted in state court for the murder of Howard. They were each sentenced to at least 25 years to life terms. Parke was also convicted in state court of selling cocaine to Howard a week before his murder. He was sentenced to eighteen years to life. Davidson, however, was not tried in state court and had never been convicted of a crime. The federal government then chose to prosecute the five men as they wanted both Davidson and Parke to be convicted of Howard's murder. Because of different rules of evidence, it was reportedly easier to prosecute the men in federal court as opposed to state court.

In 1993, Lawrence, Morales, Stewart, Davidson, and Parke were all tried in federal court for Howard's murder. On February 25, 1993, all five men were found guilty of intentionally killing a federal drug enforcement agent to advance a cocaine trafficking ring and on a second charge of murdering Howard to rob him of thousands of dollars. They were also convicted on cocaine distribution charges.

On May 28, 1993, all the men apart from Davidson were sentenced in federal court to life without parole. On July 1, 1993, Davidson was also sentenced in federal court to life without parole. He was accused of being the mastermind of the plot and the leader of a New York-based drug ring. Lawrence personally testified against Davidson at his trial and told the jury that Davidson gave him the murder weapon hours before Howard's murder and had instructed him to get the money. Howard's mother, Delores, later said, "I wanted them to get Davidson. It doesn't get Junior back. But he won't be setting up nobody else's killing or robbery." Davidson maintained his innocence.

== Release of Robert Lawrence ==
In 2012, the U.S. Supreme Court ruled in Miller v. Alabama that mandatory life sentences without the possibility of parole for juvenile offenders were unconstitutional. Lawrence, the only person involved in Howard's murder who was a juvenile at the time, appealed for a new sentence. On January 14, 2014, a federal judge reduced Lawrence's sentence from life to 31 years. The judge justified his decision by saying that Lawrence was acting on the orders of Davidson and did not know Howard was a police officer before shooting him. Before his resentencing, Lawrence faced members of Howard's family, including Howard's mother, son, and sister, and apologized for his role in the murder. He told them he was not the same person he was in 1990. Howard's mother told the judge that she had never received any kind of apology from Lawrence. Under the ruling, Lawrence would become eligible for parole in 2020.

On October 28, 2020, two days before the 30th anniversary of Howard's murder, Lawrence was released from prison. He had been confined at the Auburn Correctional Facility and was 46 years old at the time of his release. In total, he served nearly 29 years in prison. Howard's mother was against Lawrence's release, saying, "They say he was a kid when it happened. I say no. When he decided to pick up that gun, he became a man." In 2014, a week before Lawrence was resentenced, she said she did not want to think about the possibility that Lawrence could ever be a free man.

== Jaime Davidson ==
=== Commutation of sentence by President Donald Trump ===
On January 20, 2021, the final day of Donald Trump's first presidency, Trump granted pardons to 73 people and commuted the sentences of an additional 70 people. One of the people granted commutation was Jaime A. Davidson. Notably, he was the only person of the 143 who had been convicted of murder. Davidson's sentence was commuted on the basis that while he had been incarcerated he had reportedly mentored and tutored over 1,000 prisoners to help them achieve their GED certificates. He had also earned praise from prison officials for his dedication to helping others. It was argued that witnesses who testified against Davidson had later recanted their testimonies in sworn affidavits and further attested that Davidson had no involvement in Howard's murder. Supporters of Davidson also argued that the admitted shooter, Lawrence, had already been released from prison.

The commutation of Davidson's sentence by Trump came as a shock, as Trump had emphasized law and order in his re-election campaign and was a supposed ally of the Blue Lives Matter movement. Upstate politicians, prosecutors, and police union officials reacted with outrage and disbelief that Trump had personally commuted the sentence of a convicted cop killer. However, Davidson had ties to Trump, as his longtime lawyer was part of a team that represented Donald Trump Jr. Davidson had previously petitioned unsuccessfully for clemency in 2013 and 2017. The man who prosecuted Davidson, John Duncan, told The New York Times he had not been notified about the decision to commute Davidson's sentence. He further stated, "If you ask me for a list of people who nobody should give a presidential commutation to, Davidson would pretty much be at the top of the list." Duncan also pointed out that while both Davidson and Lawrence, the two people he believes are most responsible for Howard's murder, have been released from prison, Morales, Stewart, and Parke, remain incarcerated. Duncan commented, "If that's the kind of rationale the White House is using, it's kind of hard to explain or justify."

=== Subsequent conviction ===
Further controversy arose in 2024 when it was learned that Davidson had since been convicted of domestic battery in Orange County, Florida. In May 2024, an Orange County jury found Davidson guilty of attacking his wife, Nayeli Chang. Davidson was sentenced to three months in prison for the offense. He was acquitted of a third-degree felony battery charge and was ultimately just convicted of domestic battery, a misdemeanor. Court records show he is appealing his case.

According to Chang's in-court testimony and an arrest affidavit, Chang and Davidson got into an argument in 2023 after she found messages on his phone indicating he planned to leave her after five months of marriage. When she told him to leave, Davidson allegedly grabbed her by the neck but eventually let go after she threatened to call the police. However, she ended up calling them anyway.

Davidson's conviction could mean he will return to federal prison for violating the terms of his release. Ultimately, his freedom rests on the outcome of his appeal. The Tampa Bay Times reached out to a Trump campaign spokesperson through email seeking comment but did not receive a response. The New York Times received a response from Karoline Leavitt, a spokeswoman for Trump, who said, "President Trump believes anyone convicted of a crime should spend time behind bars." A lawyer who represented Davidson in his domestic battery case did not respond.

== Death of Howard's parents ==
On October 23, 2023, Wallie Howard's mother, Delores Howard, died at the age of 84. Wallie Howard's father, Wallie Howard Sr., died sometime before Delores's death.

== Training video ==
In 1994, the DEA and FBI started showing a video of a reenactment of Howard's murder at their training academies near Washington, D.C. The video, titled, "Just Another Deal," warns agents about the dangers of undercover police work. The video of the reenactment of Howard's murder is still used for agent training by both the DEA and FBI.

== See also ==
- List of law enforcement officers killed in the line of duty in the United States
- List of people granted executive clemency by Donald Trump
