= Michael Harris (music executive) =

American music executive and criminal

- Born: September 20, 1960 (age 65); Los Angeles, California, U.S.
- Education: West Los Angeles College (attended)
- Criminal charges: crack dealing, kidnapping, attempted murder
- Criminal penalty: 28-year prison sentence
- Criminal status: Clemency (2021); Pardoned (2025)
- Spouse: Lydia Harris (div. 2005)
- Children: 1

Michael R. "Harry-O" Harris (born September 20, 1960) is an American hip hop music industry executive, entrepreneur, and social activist. Harris received a 28-year prison sentence in 1987 for crack dealing, kidnapping, and attempted murder. While in prison, Harris was a consultant and early investor in Death Row Records. Harris was granted clemency in 2021 by President Donald Trump. Harris is the chief operating officer of the newly-formed Death Row Records and has founded multiple activist organizations.

== Drug dealing and incarceration ==
Harris worked odd jobs and attended West Los Angeles Community College while studying marketing and business. Harris dropped out of school and quit his job before his 20th birthday, and began selling crack cocaine in his native Los Angeles. Within 5 years, Harris built a large, national drug operation working with his brother David, using gangs including both the Bloods and Crips and the Cali Cartel. The network brought in almost $2 million daily. Harris invested some of the proceeds into multiple, legitimate Los Angeles businesses. These included a deli, beauty salon, limousine service, an electrical company, and a theatrical production company involved in the 1988 play Checkmates which marked Denzel Washington's Broadway debut. In 1987, Harris received a 28-year prison sentence for the kidnapping and attempted murder of James Lester, a distant relative and member of the drug ring. While incarcerated, Harris became editor-in-chief of the San Quentin News.

== Death Row Records ==
In the fall of 1991, Harris states he introduced his lawyer, David Kenner, to Suge Knight. Harris states he invested $1.5 million to co-found Godfather Entertainment with Knight, inclusive of the Death Row division. As it is illegal for a prisoner to run a business, Harris described his role as a "consultant" to his wife Lydia's role in the business. Knight disputes the substance of this financing story, instead stating the source of funding included Sony, Interscope, and Time Warner. Death Row subsequently generated hundreds of million of dollars in sales.

Death Row Records filed for bankruptcy in April 2006 and was auctioned to WIDEawake Entertainment for $18 million on January 15, 2009. After changing hands multiple times, Snoop Dogg purchased Death Row in 2022.

== Clemency and activism ==
Harris campaigned for early release from prison, after disavowing his prior criminal behavior and starting multiple educational programs in prison. On January 20, 2021, Harris's sentence was commuted by President Donald Trump. In October 2024, Harris endorsed Donald Trump in the 2024 United States presidential election.

Harris serves as chief operating officer of the newly formed Death Row Records, which is run by Snoop Dogg. As of 2024, Harris was working with Denzel Washington and Snoop Dogg on a documentary of his life by Death Row Films.

Harris's non-profit Our Community First Action drew praise from Donald Trump. Harris also established Philanthropy TV, focused on both national and international philanthropy.

On May 28, 2025, Harris received a full and unconditional pardon by President Donald Trump.

== Personal life ==
Harris and wife Lydia divorced in 2005. Lydia has sung under the name Ms. Lydia. They have one daughter.

== See also ==
- List of people granted executive clemency in the first Trump presidency
- List of people granted executive clemency in the second Trump presidency
