= Philip Esformes =

American healthcare executive and felon

- Booking photo (2024)
- Born: October 13, 1968 (age 58); Chicago, IL, U.S.
- Occupations: Businessman; healthcare executive
- Criminal information
- Status: Sentence commuted
- Criminal charges: Felony counts of: Conspiracy to defraud the United States and pay and receive health care kickbacks; Receipt of kickbacks in connection with a federal health care program (two counts); Payment of kickbacks in connection with a federal health care program (four counts); Conspiracy to commit money laundering; Money laundering (six counts); Conspiracy to commit federal program bribery; Conspiracy to commit federal program bribery and honest services wire fraud; obstruction of justice
- Penalty: 20 years imprisonment ; (Note: Esformes had spent four and a half years in prison when Trump commuted his sentence.) 3 years supervised release; $5.53 million in restitution; $38.7 million in forfeiture

Philip Esformes (born 1968) is a former healthcare executive and nursing home mogul primarily known for orchestrating what the U.S. Department of Justice described as the largest healthcare fraud scheme in the country's history involving about $1.3 billion dollars in fraudulent claims. He was convicted in 2019 for healthcare fraud, illegal kickbacks, bribery, and money laundering and sentenced to 20 years in prison. President Donald Trump commuted his sentence in 2020.

== Early life ==
Philip Esformes’ father was Morris Esformes (1946–2022), a prominent Chicago-based nursing home magnate, philanthropist, and ordained Orthodox rabbi. Between 1998 and 2013, the father and son paid over $20 million in settlements to the U.S. government to resolve allegations of kickbacks and substandard care at their facilities, though they never admitted guilt in these cases.

== Medicare fraud ==
Esformes ran a network of nursing homes in Florida, Illinois, and Missouri that he used to perpetrate a massive Medicaid fraud scheme involving about $1.3 billion in fraudulent claims. He billed Medicare and Medicaid for medically unnecessary services or services that were not provided, paid and received kickbacks, paid bribes to doctors to refer patients to his facilities, bribed doctors and state regulators.

Esformes also used narcotics as lures, directing his facilities to give powerful opioids like OxyContin and fentanyl to get the patients addicted so they remained at the facilities and he could continue billing Medicare and Medicaid for their care.

An FBI agent called him “a man driven by almost unbounded greed.” He was sentenced to 20 years in prison for healthcare fraud, illegal kickbacks, bribery, and money laundering and payment of approx. $44 million (about $5.5 million in restitution and $39 million in forfeiture) to the U.S. Government.

On December 22, 2020, President Donald Trump commuted his sentence upon suggestion by Trump's son in law Jared Kushner and the Aleph Institute, meaning the remainder of Esformes's 20-year prison term was canceled, but the other parts of his sentence were left intact.

== University of Pennsylvania college admissions bribery ==
Esformes approached the University of Pennsylvania’s varsity basketball coach Jerome Allen in May 2013 about placing his son on his list of recruits so he would be put on a fast track to gain acceptance to the Ivy League school. Esformes bribed Allen with about $300,000 in total, according to Allen's testimony in a Miami federal court.

== Domestic violence ==
On October 12, 2024, Esformes was arrested on domestic violence charges involving his domestic partner, Aurelia Castiel. On Tuesday, Nov. 12, 2024, prosecutors dropped the case.

== See also ==
- List of people granted executive clemency in the first Trump presidency
- Medicare fraud
- Opioid epidemic in the United States
