= Kristian Saucier =

United States Navy sailor

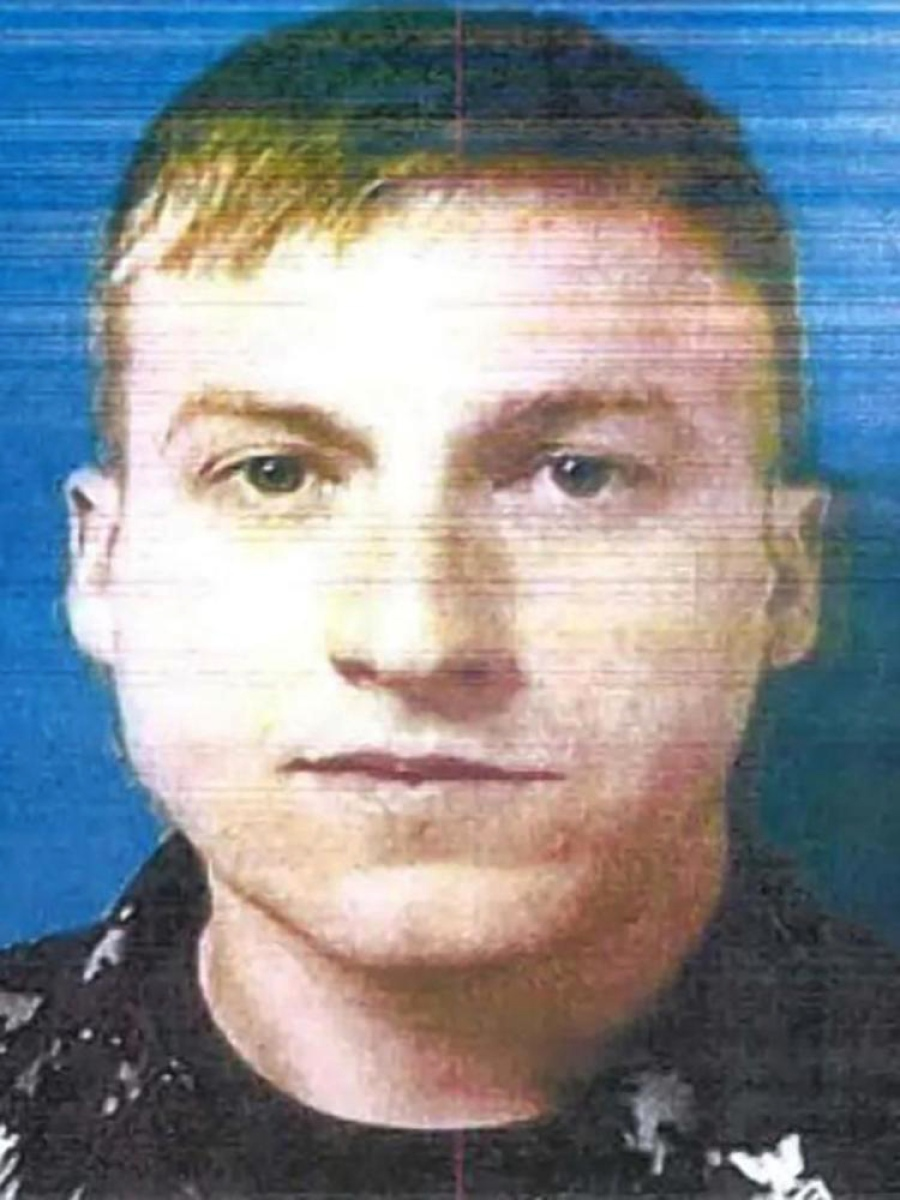
- Born: c. 1986 (age 39–40)
- Allegiance: United States
- Branch: United States Navy

Kristian Mark Saucier (born c. 1986) is a former U.S. Navy sailor who was convicted of unauthorized retention of national defense information and sentenced to one year in prison in October 2016 for taking photographs of classified engineering areas of USS Alexandria (SSN-757), a nuclear-powered attack submarine, in 2009. President Donald Trump pardoned Saucier on March 9, 2018.

== Early life ==
Saucier is a native of Arlington, Vermont.

== Crime and conviction ==
Saucier was a machinist's mate on board the submarine USS Alexandria from September 2007 to March 2012. In 2009, Saucier took photographs of classified areas on the submarine while it was moored at Naval Submarine Base New London in Connecticut. The photographs showed components of the submarine nuclear propulsion system, including "various control panels, a panoramic view of the reactor compartment and a panel that showed the condition and exact location of the submarine at the time the photo was taken." FBI forensics showed that some of the photographs were taken at unusual hours, such as one photograph taken at 4 a.m. and others taken at 1:30 a.m. Personal electronic devices are prohibited aboard U.S. submarines owing to sensitive areas on board. In March 2012, Saucier left his phone at a waste transfer station (dump) in Hampton, Connecticut, where the photographs were discovered by a supervisor. The supervisor contacted a retired Navy officer, who alerted the Naval Criminal Investigative Service and Federal Bureau of Investigation. The FBI said that after being interviewed by FBI agents, Saucier destroyed his camera and computer and disposed of their parts. At the time, Saucier held the rank of petty officer first class.

Saucier was arrested in May 2015 and charged with unlawful retention of national defense information and obstruction of justice in the U.S. District Court for the District of Connecticut. In May 2016, he pleaded guilty to unlawful retention of national defense information. In August 2016, U.S. District Judge Stefan Underhill sentenced Saucier to one year in federal prison. He was given an other-than-honorable discharge from the Navy. At sentencing, Saucier unsuccessfully argued for probation rather than imprisonment on the basis that Hillary Clinton was not indicted for her email controversy. Saucier's lawyers acknowledged that the two cases were different: Saucier admitted knowing that what he was doing was illegal. Judge Underhill rejected this argument as weak, but sentenced Saucier to one year in prison (rather than the five to seven years under the Federal Sentencing Guidelines) because he determined Saucier to be "fundamentally...a good person" who had done a "beyond stupid" act.

Saucier served his sentence at the Federal Medical Center, Devens. He was released from prison in September 2017.

== Pardon ==
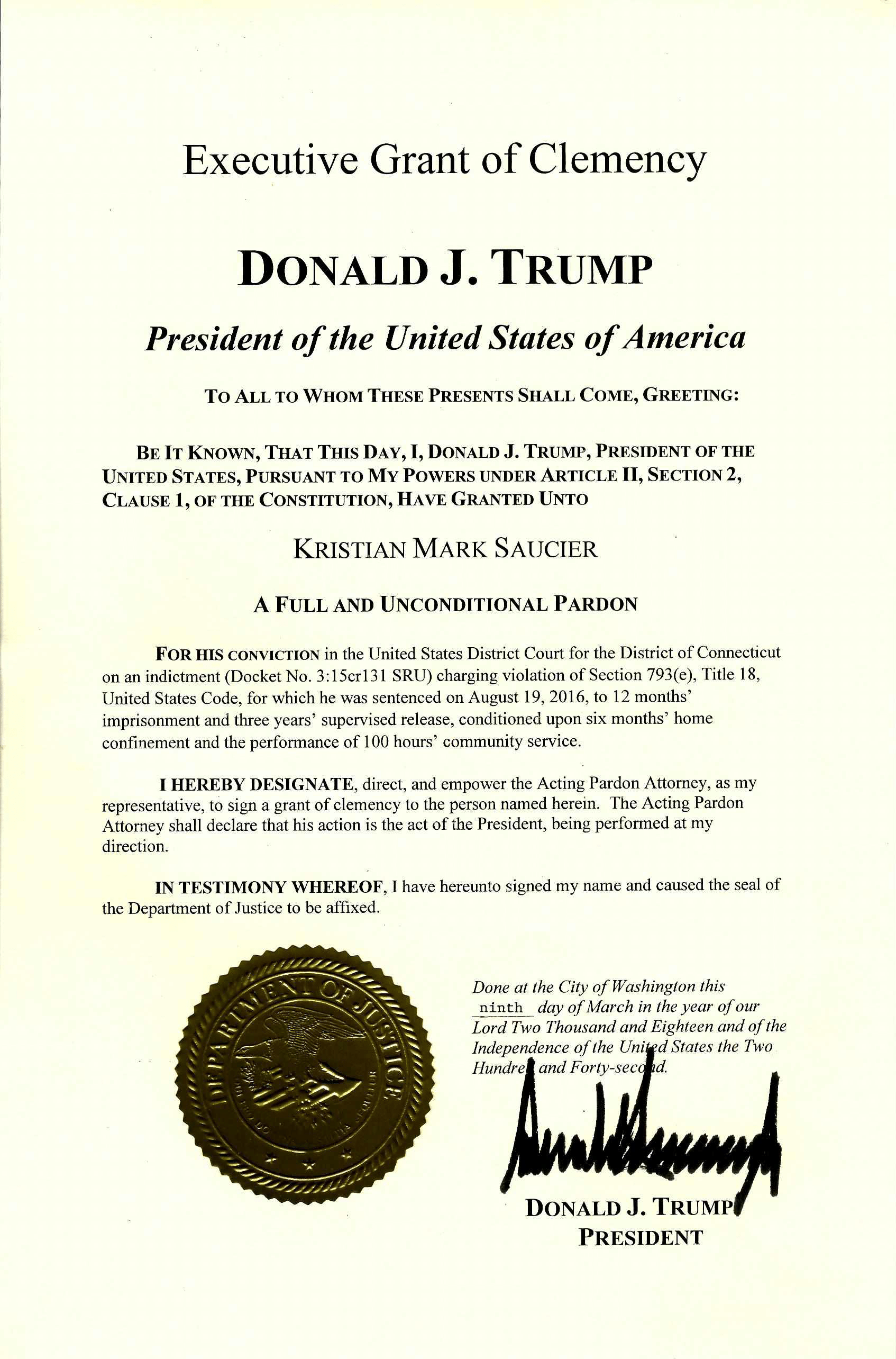
Pardon for Kristian Mark Saucier, signed by President Donald Trump.

Saucier’s family and others waged "an aggressive public campaign" for a presidential pardon. He was represented pro bono by Ronald Daigle. Saucier requested a pardon in 2016 and 2017 but was denied a waiver needed to apply within five years of criminal sentencing.

During his 2016 presidential election campaign, then-Republican-candidate Donald Trump compared Saucier's situation to the Hillary Clinton email controversy, asserting that Clinton's treatment was lenient compared with Saucier's. In January 2018, Trump tweeted about "sailors pictures on submarine" [sic], which was seen as a reference to Saucier.

On February 20, 2018, the Justice Department's Office of the Pardon Attorney informed Saucier that his pardon request was being processed, despite previously refusing to issue a waiver. In early March 2018, Saucier appeared on Fox & Friends and argued that he deserved to be pardoned. Trump pardoned Saucier on March 9, 2018. After issuing the pardon, Trump tweeted, "Congratulations to Kristian Saucier, a man who has served proudly in the Navy, on your newly found Freedom. Now you can go out and have the life you deserve!"

== Lawsuit ==
In July 2018, Saucier filed a lawsuit against former President Barack Obama, former FBI Director James Comey, former U.S. Attorney General Loretta Lynch, former FBI Deputy Director Andrew McCabe, and others, claiming that he was selectively prosecuted, claiming that a double standard exists that protected Hillary Clinton in her email controversy, and seeking $20 million in damages. All of Saucier's claims were dismissed by a federal court by U.S. District Judge David N. Hurd in February 2019.

== See also ==
- List of people granted executive clemency in the first Trump presidency
