= List of people granted executive clemency in the first Trump presidency =

During his tenure as the 45th president of the United States (January 20, 2017 – January 20, 2021), Donald Trump granted executive clemency to 237 individuals in his first term, all of whom were charged or convicted of federal criminal offenses.

== Background ==
The U.S. president's power of clemency arises from Article II of the United States Constitution. Clemency "may take several forms, including pardon, commutation of sentence, remission of fine or restitution, and reprieve", with the two most commonly used forms being a pardon or commutation. A pardon is an official forgiveness for an acknowledged crime. Once a pardon is issued, all further punishment for the crime is waived. The president can only grant pardons for federal offenses. When the president commutes a sentence, it reduces the severity of a sentence without voiding the conviction itself; for example, a commutation may reduce or eliminate a prison term, while leaving other punishments intact. The power of clemency is "one of the most unlimited powers bestowed on the president by the Constitution."

== Trump's first-term use of executive clemency ==
=== Role of the OPA ===
For 125 years, the key adviser to the president on clemency has been the Department of Justice's Office of the Pardon Attorney (OPA) which normally reviews all requests for pardons. Trump often bypassed the OPA, and, unlike previous presidents, made the majority of his grants to executive clemency to "well-connected offenders who had not filed petitions with the pardon office or did not meet its requirements." Ultimately, of the 237 grants of clemency by Trump, only 25 came through the Office of the Pardon Attorney's process (which at the end of Trump's presidency had a backlog of 14,000 applications); the other clemency recipients came to Trump's attention through an ad hoc process at the Trump White House that benefited clemency applicants with money or connections to Trump allies, friends, and family members. Most of Trump's pardons and commutations were granted to people with personal or political connections to him. He frequently bypassed the OPA, and the majority of his executive clemency grants were made to well-connected convicts who did not file a petition with the OPA or meet the OPA's requirements.

Legal experts raised concerns that Trump was "relying on his personal connections rather than the Justice Department's established review process for finding convicts deserving of clemency." A late December 2020 analysis by Harvard Law School's Jack Goldsmith determined that "seven of the 94 Trump grants came on recommendation from the pardon attorney" and "at least 84 out of 94 Trump pardons had a personal or political connection to the president." On February 19, 2020, Vermont Senator Patrick Leahy requested information on the process used by Trump in deciding to grant clemency to 11 people the preceding day. In response to the criticism of his bypassing of the OPA, Trump said that he is the "chief law enforcement officer of the country."

=== Number of pardons ===
Overall, Trump granted fewer clemencies than many of the modern presidents during his first term.

Since 1921, only two Presidents granted clemency on fewer occasions than Trump. In Trump's first term, he granted clemency 237 times, compared with about 78 by George H. W. Bush and about 200 by George W. Bush. Of the pardons and commutations that Trump did grant, the vast majority were to persons to whom Trump had a personal or political connection, or persons for whom executive clemency served a political goal. A significant number had been convicted of fraud or public corruption. The New York Times reported that during the closing days of the Trump presidency, individuals with access to the administration, such as former administration officials, were soliciting fees to lobby for presidential pardons. Compared to other presidents, Trump granted clemency at low rates, with the bulk coming later in his term. Of Trump's grants of clemency, 84% were made in his last fiscal year in office, with 144 (60%) of his 237 grants of clemency being granted on his last night in office; the list was "assembled so hastily that it contained inaccurate information about some cases."

Former Justice Department official and Mueller investigation prosecutor Andrew Weissmann noted that the language of Trump's pardons varied, ranging from a broad pardon of Michael Flynn to narrower pardons for several others, including Paul Manafort and Roger Stone, which Weissmann argued created "windows of opportunity" to prosecute individuals who had been narrowly pardoned.

=== Major beneficiaries ===
==== Supporters and political allies ====
Trump's use of the pardon power was marked by an unprecedented degree of favoritism. He frequently granted executive clemency to his supporters or political allies, or following personal appeals or campaigns in conservative media, as in the cases of Rod Blagojevich, Michael Milken, Joe Arpaio, Dinesh D'Souza, and Clint Lorance, as well as Bernard Kerik. Trump granted clemency to five of his former campaign staff members and political advisers: Paul Manafort, Roger Stone, Michael Flynn, Stephen K. Bannon, and George Papadopoulos.

Many of Trump's grants of clemency were criticized by the federal agents and prosecutors who investigated and prosecuted the cases. Trump's grant of clemency to Stone in July 2020 marked the first time Trump granted clemency to a "figure directly connected to the president's campaign." Representatives Jerrold Nadler and Carolyn B. Maloney, who chair two House committees, said that "No other president has exercised the clemency power for such a patently personal and self-serving purpose" and said that they would investigate whether Stone's commutation was a reward for protecting Trump. Most Republican elected officials remained silent on Trump's commutation of Stone. Exceptions were Republican senators Mitt Romney, who termed the commutation "unprecedented, historic corruption," and Pat Toomey, who called the commutation a "mistake" due in part to the severity of the crimes of which Stone was convicted.

On February 18, 2020, President Trump commuted Rod Blagojevich's 14-year corruption sentence, wiping away the sentence but not the conviction.

==== Requests by celebrities ====
In 2018, following a request by celebrity Kim Kardashian, Trump commuted the life sentence of Alice Marie Johnson who had been convicted of drug trafficking. In August 2020, he pardoned Johnson after she had praised his leadership in a campaign video at the 2020 Republican National Convention.

==== Military personnel accused or convicted of war crimes ====
Trump granted executive clemency to three court-martialed U.S. military officers who were accused or convicted of war crimes in Iraq and Afghanistan. Trump granted the pardons against the advice of senior military and Defense Department leadership, as well as U.S. military lawyers. Critics state that Trump's pardons of the officers undermined military discipline, constituted an inappropriate interference in the U.S. military justice system, and called into question the U.S. commitment to the law of armed conflict. Tensions between Trump and the Defense Department regarding Trump's interventions in the military justice system culminated in the firing of Secretary of the Navy Richard V. Spencer. Two ex-military officers pardoned by Trump appeared with the president at campaign events in 2019.

==== Congressmen ====
Trump issued pardons to seven Republican congressmen convicted of crimes: Chris Collins, Duncan D. Hunter, Steve Stockman, Rick Renzi, Robin Hayes, Mark Siljander, and Randall "Duke" Cunningham.

==== Healthcare industry ====
Trump also granted clemency to at least ten healthcare executives and doctors convicted in large-scale Medicare fraud schemes. The National Health Care Anti-Fraud Association criticized Trump's pardons to executives who orchestrated massive Medicare frauds.

==== Wealthy individuals ====
Many wealthy individuals paid tens of thousands of dollars to former advisors to Trump for them to lobby Trump to grant pardons, bypassing the review process of the Office of the Pardon Attorney. Trump former personal lawyer John M. Dowd was hired by a number of convicts to lobby Trump for clemency, taking advantage of his direct access to Trump's White House Counsel's Office. Matt Schlapp, the chairman of the American Conservative Union and a lobbyist close to Trump administration, also lobbied Trump for clemency on behalf of their clients, as did Mark D. Cowan, another lobbyist allied with the administration. Trump's White House Counsel Pat Cipollone was officially in charge of the internal White House pardon process, but "key gatekeepers" included Trump's daughter Ivanka Trump and son-in-law Jared Kushner. Trump was also influenced by a "kitchen cabinet" that included Tolman; Americans for Prosperity chairman Mark Holden; Trump's former acting attorney general Matt Whitaker; Trump clemency recipient Alice Marie Johnson; and Trump's former attorney Pam Bondi, a former Florida Attorney General.

=== Chronology ===
From 2017 to 2019, the pardons included former Arizona sheriff Joe Arpaio; former Navy sailor Kristian Saucier, who was convicted of taking classified photographs of classified areas inside a submarine; Scooter Libby, a political aide to former vice president Dick Cheney; conservative commentator Dinesh D'Souza. He pardoned or reversed the sentences of three American soldiers convicted or accused of war crimes in Afghanistan or Iraq.

In November and December 2020, Trump pardoned four Blackwater guards convicted of killing Iraqi civilians in the 2007 Nisour Square massacre; white-collar criminals Michael Milken and Bernard Kerik; and daughter Ivanka's father-in-law Charles Kushner. He also pardoned five people convicted as a result of investigations into Russian interference in the 2016 presidential elections: Michael Flynn, George Papadopoulos, Alex van der Zwaan, Roger Stone, whose 40-month sentence for lying to Congress, witness tampering, and obstruction he had already commuted in July, and Paul Manafort.

In his last full day in office, Trump granted 143 pardons and commutations, including to his former chief strategist Steve Bannon, Trump fundraiser Elliott Broidy, and former Republican congressmen Rick Renzi, Robert Hayes, and Randall "Duke" Cunningham. He also commuted the sentences of dozens of people, including former Detroit mayor Kwame Kilpatrick and sports gambler Billy Walters; the latter had paid tens of thousands of dollars to former Trump attorney John M. Dowd to plead his case with Trump.

=== Responses ===
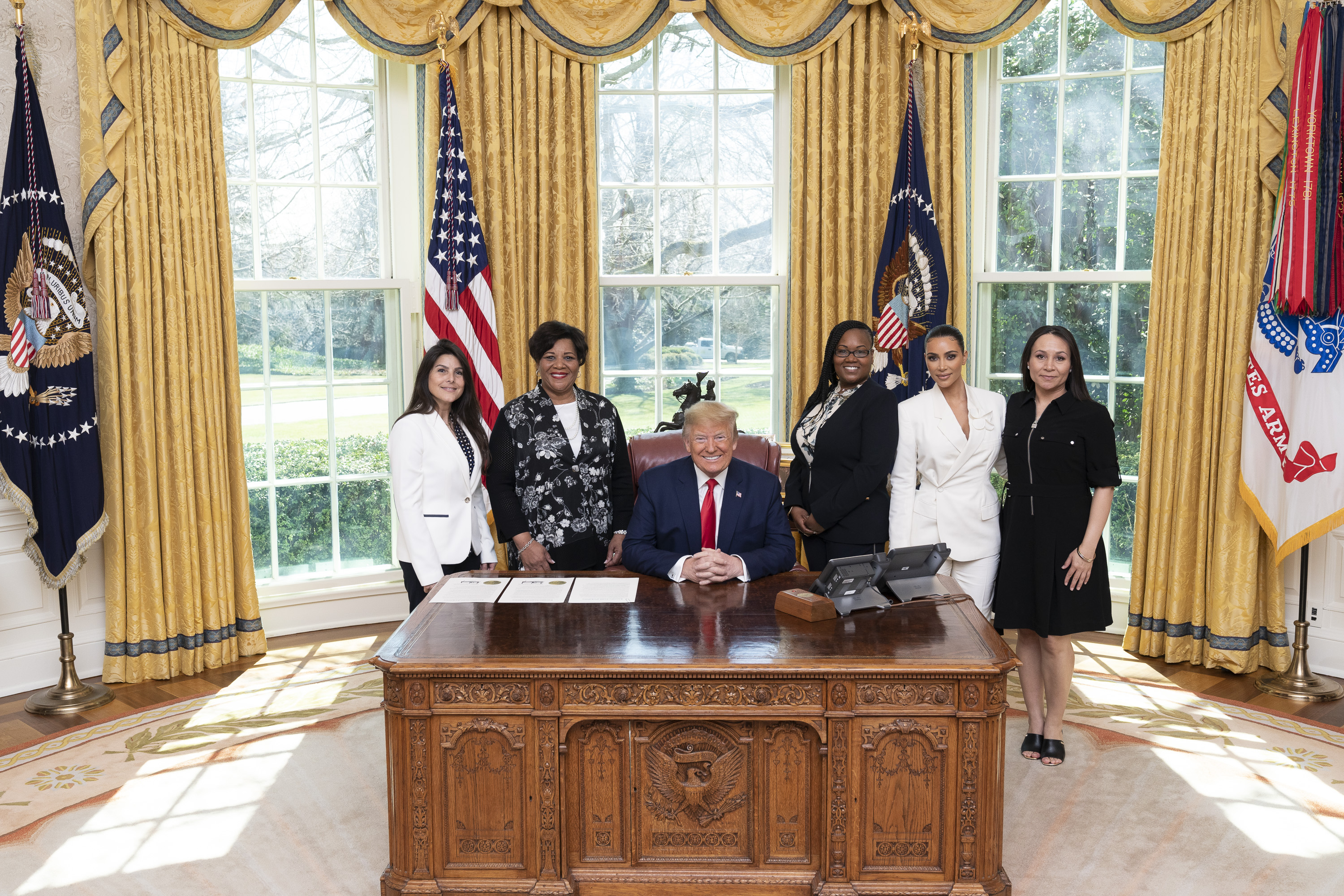
Trump in the Oval Office with commutation recipients

In October 2019, New York enacted the TRUST Act, which was signed into law by Andrew Cuomo. Among other things, the act closed a double jeopardy provision of state law to allow state prosecutors to pursue charges for violations of New York law against individuals pardoned by the president for a violation of federal law. The New York legislation was aimed at Trump's use of the pardon power. New York state attorney general Letitia James, proposed the law after multiple former Trump associates were investigated in New York state. James' office also investigated the finances of Trump and the Trump Organization. Upon passage of the law, James said that "We have a responsibility to ensure that individuals who commit crimes under New York state law are held accountable for those crimes. This critical new law closes a gaping loophole that could have allowed any president to abuse the presidential pardon power by unfairly granting a pardon to a family member or close associate and possibly allow that individual to evade justice altogether."

== List of recipients of executive clemency from Trump ==
=== Pardons ===
Trump issued a total of 144 pardons during his first four years in office: 1 in 2017, 6 in 2018, 11 in 2019, 52 in 2020, and 74 in January 2021.

Date of pardon	Name	Court	Sentencing date	Sentence	Offense	Notes
August 25, 2017	Joseph M. Arpaio	District of Arizona	October 5, 2017	N/A – Arpaio's pardon was issued after his conviction, but prior to his being sentenced.	Criminal contempt of court	Main article: Pardon of Joe Arpaio Former sheriff of Maricopa County, Arizona and anti-illegal immigration hardliner, Arpaio was convicted of contempt of court and was awaiting sentencing. Arpaio was pardoned for one contempt offense of which he had been convicted (but not yet sentenced) and for any not-yet-charged offenses he may have committed in the same case. In issuing the pardon, the White House said that Arpaio had given "more than fifty years of admirable service to" the United States.
March 9, 2018	Kristian Mark Saucier	District of Connecticut	August 19, 2016	One year in prison, three years of supervised release, and 100 hours of community service	Unauthorized possession and retention of national defense information	Saucier was given an other-than-honorable discharge from the Navy for taking photos of classified areas, instruments and equipment, including the nuclear propulsion system, in a military submarine. At sentencing, Saucier unsuccessfully argued for probation rather than imprisonment on the basis that Hillary Clinton was not indicted for her email controversy.
April 13, 2018	I. Lewis (Scooter) Libby	District of Columbia	June 14, 2007	30 months of prison, two years of probation, and a $250,000 fine	Perjury (two counts), obstruction of justice and false statements	Previously an aide to former vice president Dick Cheney. Convicted in connection with the CIA leak scandal. Pardoned following an earlier commutation by President George W. Bush in July 2007.
May 24, 2018	John Arthur (Jack) Johnson	Northern District of Illinois	September 14, 1920	One year and one day in prison, and $1,000 fine	Violation of the Mann Act	Posthumous pardon. Famed African-American boxer, convicted by an all-white jury in 1913 for traveling with his white girlfriend. It was then illegal to transport women across state lines for "immoral" purposes.
May 31, 2018	Dinesh D'Souza	Southern District of New York	September 23, 2014	Five years of probation, eight months of supervision in a halfway house, and a $30,000 fine	Campaign finance violations	In 2014, conservative commentator D'Souza pleaded guilty to making illegal campaign contributions to the 2012 Senate campaign of his Republican friend, Wendy Long.
July 10, 2018	Dwight Lincoln Hammond Jr.	District of Oregon	October 7, 2015	Five years in prison	Arson on federal land	Father and son ranchers were convicted of arson on federal land in 2012. While initially sentenced to time served, their sentence was increased in 2015 to the mandatory 5-year minimum term under federal law. The increased sentence triggered protests which culminated in the armed occupation of a wildlife refuge. The Hammonds had rejected the protesters' assistance.
July 10, 2018	Steven Dwight Hammond	District of Oregon	October 7, 2015	Five years in prison	Arson on federal land	Father and son ranchers were convicted of arson on federal land in 2012. While initially sentenced to time served, their sentence was increased in 2015 to the mandatory 5-year minimum term under federal law. The increased sentence triggered protests which culminated in the armed occupation of a wildlife refuge. The Hammonds had rejected the protesters' assistance.
May 6, 2019	Michael Chase Behenna	General court martial, U.S. Army	February 28, 2009	Forfeiture of all pay and allowances; confinement for 20 years (amended from 25 years on July 2, 2009); dismissal from service	Assault and unpremeditated murder	Behenna, a U.S. Army first lieutenant, was convicted by a court-martial of the murder of an Iraqi man. He was released on parole in 2014.
May 15, 2019	Conrad Moffat Black	Northern District of Illinois	December 10, 2007	42 months in prison, two years of supervised release, and $125,000 fine	Mail fraud and attempted obstruction of justice	Former media mogul, current friend, supporter and biographer of President Trump. Conviction reviewed by the Supreme Court in Black v. United States; convictions later upheld. Released from prison in 2014 and deported to Canada where he was born.
May 15, 2019	Patrick James Nolan	Eastern District of California	February 18, 1994	33 months in prison, three years of supervised release, and $10,000 fine	Conducting the affairs of an enterprise through a pattern of racketeering	Former Republican lawmaker who pled guilty to soliciting for illegal campaign donations after being caught by the Shrimpscam sting operation by the FBI. Ultimately served 26 months; released in 1996 and became an activist for criminal-justice reform.
July 29, 2019	John Richard Bubala	Southern District of Indiana	April 5, 1991	Two years' probation, conditioned upon four months' community confinement and two months' home confinement	Conversion of government property	Pleaded guilty to improper use of federal government property by transferring automotive equipment to the town of Milltown, Indiana, for its maintenance use. His primary aim was to help the town, and he sought neither compensation nor recognition for his actions.
July 29, 2019	Roy Wayne McKeever	Western District of Oklahoma	March 2, 1989	One year in prison and one year of supervised release	Transporting marijuana	After being arrested for transporting marijuana from Mexico to Oklahoma, he immediately accepted responsibility and pleaded guilty to one count of using a telephone to facilitate the distribution of a controlled substance.
July 29, 2019	Rodney Masaru Takumi	District of Hawaii	February 9, 1987	Two years of probation and fined $250	Working at an illegal gambling parlor	While working, he was arrested during a law enforcement raid.
July 29, 2019	Michael Anthony Tedesco	Western District of Pennsylvania	December 7, 1990	One year in prison and five years' supervised release	Conspiracy to possess with intent to distribute and distribute in excess of 5 kilograms of cocaine and quantities of marijuana	Former president Barack Obama pardoned him in 2017 for drug trafficking, but due to a clerical error, his fraud conviction was not encompassed within that grant of executive clemency.
July 29, 2019	Chalmer Lee Williams	Eastern District of Kentucky	May 25, 1995	Four months in prison and three years of supervised release	Conspiracy to steal firearms and other goods as part of an interstate shipment; theft from shipment in interstate commerce; theft of firearms shipped in interstate commerce	Participated in and was convicted of several crimes related to the theft and sale of stolen firearms. Upon arrest, he immediately accepted responsibility for his actions. In light of his impeccable behavior while serving his sentence, his supervised release terminated one year early, and in 1998, the governor of Kentucky restored his voting rights.
October 10, 2019	Zay Jeffries	Southern District of New York	November 12, 1948	$2,500 fine	Conspiracy to violate the Sherman Antitrust Act (Anti-competitive practices)	Posthumous pardon. Jeffries was convicted of violating the Sherman Antitrust Act of 1890 through his engineering firm's work. His indictment in 1941 was deferred until 1947, due to his efforts during World War II.
November 15, 2019	Mathew L. Golsteyn	General court martial, U.S. Army	N/A – Golsteyn's pardon was issued before his trial.	N/A (not tried or convicted)	Premeditated murder	On December 13, 2018, Golsteyn, then serving as a major in the United States Army, was charged with the murder of a suspected bomb-maker in Afghanistan in 2010, following an interview in which he admitted to killing the man. At the time of the pardon, Golsteyn's case had not yet gone to trial.
November 15, 2019	Clint Lorance	General court martial, U.S. Army	August 1, 2013	Nineteen years in prison, forfeiture of pay, and dismissal from the Army	Murder (two counts), attempted murder, communicating a threat (two counts), reckless endangerment, witness tampering, obstruction of justice	As a first lieutenant in the U.S. Army, Lorance was convicted of murdering two Afghans; he ordered his troops to shoot unarmed villagers, then made false reports as part of a cover-up attempt. Lorance was turned in by his own men and convicted at court-martial. His cause was later championed by conservative members of Congress and Fox News personalities.
February 18, 2020	Edward J. DeBartolo Jr.	Middle District of Louisiana	October 6, 1998	$250,000 fine, two years of probation, payment of $350,000 restitution	Misprision of felony	DeBartolo, the former owner of the San Francisco 49ers, pleaded guilty in 1998 to concealing an extortion attempt; in 1997, he met former governor of Louisiana, Edwin Edwards, and gave him $400,000 in exchange for Edwards' help obtaining a license from the gaming board to allow Hollywood Casino Corp. (in which DeBartolo was an investor) to operate a riverboat casino.
February 18, 2020	Michael Milken	Southern District of New York	November 21, 1990	$200 million fine; two years of prison; three years' supervised release; 5,400 hours of community service	Conspiracy; securities fraud; mail fraud; tax fraud; filing false reports with the Securities and Exchange Commission (SEC); assisting a brokerage firm in violating its net capital requirements	In pardoning financier Milken, Trump cited his charitable work after his release from prison. Milken's separate, SEC-imposed lifetime ban on securities trading continues.
February 18, 2020	Angela Ronae Stanton (Angela Stanton-King)	Northern District of Georgia	May 24, 2007	Time served; three years' supervised release; six months' home confinement detention program	Conspiracy to transport in interstate commerce a stolen motor vehicle and tampering with a vehicle identification number (VIN) (17 counts)	Angela Stanton ran in the 2020 election as a Republican against Representative John Lewis and then to fill his seat after Lewis's death.
February 18, 2020	Ariel Manuel Friedler	Eastern District of Virginia	August 8, 2014	Two months' imprisonment; one year's supervised release; $274,197.60 restitution to Maxient LLC; $217,097.60 due and payable immediately; and $250,000 fine due and payable immediately	Conspiracy to access a protected computer without authorization	The former CEO of an education software business, Friedler used the Tor network to mask his identity while he accessed his rivals' systems using those credentials to harvest their contacts database as well as snoop on their software design and features. Former New Jersey governor Chris Christie lobbied for Friedler's pardon.
February 18, 2020	David Hossein Safavian	District of Columbia	October 27, 2006	72 months' imprisonment; two years' supervised release	Obstruction of justice and perjury (three counts)	Safavian is a Republican former lawyer and long-time associate of lobbyist Jack Abramoff. Through much of his career, he alternated between government roles and Washington lobbyist roles, in what is known as the "revolving door". He was serving as Administrator for Federal Procurement Policy, Office of Management and Budget, when he was arrested in connection with the Jack Abramoff Indian lobbying scandal.
February 18, 2020	Paul Pogue	Eastern District of Texas	August 30, 2010	Three years' probation; $250,000 fine; and $473,604.09 restitution	Making and subscribing a false tax return	Pogue, the founder and executive of McKinney, Texas-based construction company Pogue Construction, pleaded guilty in 2010 for under-reporting his taxable income in 2004, 2005 and 2006, failing to pay more than $400,000 taxes owed. In 2019, Pogue's son Ben Pogue and daughter-in-law Ashleigh Pogue gave a total of $238,541 to Trump Victory, a vehicle for Trump's reelection campaign. Former Republican senator Rick Santorum was a leading advocate for Pogue's pardon; Paul Pogue had been a contributor to Santorum's presidential election bid.
February 18, 2020	Bernard Kerik	Southern District of New York	May 18, 2010	48 months' imprisonment; 3 years' supervised release; $187,931 restitution	Obstructing the administration of the Internal Revenue Laws; aiding in the preparation of a false income tax return; making false statements on a loan application; making false statements (five counts)	Kerik, the former New York City police commissioner, has been a contributor to Fox News. His pardon had been urged by Rudy Giuliani.
February 18, 2020	Susan B. Anthony	Northern District of New York	June 18, 1873	$100 fine and the cost of prosecution	Illegal voting	Anthony, a women's rights and women's suffrage activist, famously cast a ballot in the 1872 presidential election; prosecuted and convicted of violating the Enforcement Act of 1870; she never paid the fine. Trump posthumously pardoned Anthony on the centennial of the ratification of the 19th Amendment.
August 25, 2020	Jon Donyae Ponder	District of Nevada	December 27, 2005	63 months' imprisonment; 36 months' supervised release; $6,165 restitution	Bank robbery; interference with commerce by armed robbery (six counts)	Ponder, the founder of the group Hope for Prisoners, was pardoned by Trump in a videorecorded segment broadcast at the 2020 Republican National Convention. The segment "provoked widespread criticism that Trump was abusing his office for purely partisan purposes."
August 28, 2020	Alice Marie Johnson	Western District of Tennessee	March 21, 1997	Life sentence (previously commuted to time served)	Conspiracy to possess with intent to distribute cocaine; attempted possession of 12 kilos of cocaine with intent to distribute; attempted possession of 9 kilos of cocaine; attempted possession of 75 kilos of cocaine; attempted possession of 10 kilos of cocaine; conspiracy to commit money laundering; money laundering ($1.5 million); structuring monetary transactions	Two years after Trump commuted Johnson's sentence (see below), he issued her a full pardon in August 2020.
November 25, 2020	Michael T. Flynn	District of Columbia	N/A	N/A – Flynn's pardon was issued after his conviction, but before his scheduled sentencing hearing.	Making false statements to Federal investigators	Flynn, Donald Trump's National Security Advisor, pleaded guilty to making false statements to the FBI in December 2017, during the Mueller special counsel investigation, but his sentencing was delayed.
December 22, 2020	George Papadopoulos	District of Columbia	September 7, 2018	14 days in prison; 12 months of supervised release; 200 hours of community service; $9,500 fine	Making false statements	Papadopoulos, one of the Trump campaign's foreign policy advisers, was the first individual to be prosecuted in the Mueller special counsel investigation.
December 22, 2020	Alex van der Zwaan	District of Columbia	April 3, 2018	30 days in federal prison; $20,000 fine; 2 months supervised release	Making false statements	A Dutch attorney, Van der Zwaan was prosecuted in the Mueller special counsel investigation.
December 22, 2020	Duncan D. Hunter	Southern District of California	March 17, 2020	11 months in federal prison	Misusing campaign funds	A former United States representative, Hunter was set to begin his sentence in January 2021.
December 22, 2020	Christopher Carl Collins	Southern District of New York	January 17, 2020	26 months in federal prison	Making false statements, conspiracy to commit securities fraud	Collins is a former Republican congressman and a staunch Trump supporter; he pleaded guilty in 2019 to an insider trading scheme. Collins' son Cameron Collins, who pleaded guilty to participating in the crime and was sentenced to probation, was not pardoned by Trump.
December 22, 2020	Nicholas Abram Slatten	District of Columbia	August 14, 2019	Life sentence; three years' supervised release	Murder in the first degree	Slatten, Slough, Liberty, and Heard were four Blackwater contractors who opened fire in Nisoor Square in 2007, while guarding an American diplomat, killing at least 14 Iraqi civilians. The pardons of the four men were condemned by the Office of the United Nations High Commissioner for Human Rights, which warned that the pardons undermined accountability for war crimes, and "expressed extreme concern that by permitting private security contractors to operate with impunity in armed conflicts, States would be encouraged to circumvent their humanitarian law obligations by outsourcing core military operations to the private sector." Trump did not pardon a fifth Blackwater guard, who pleaded guilty and cooperated with the prosecution.
December 22, 2020	Paul Alvin Slough	District of Columbia	September 5, 2019	At least 144 months' imprisonment; 36 months' supervised release; fines	Voluntary manslaughter; attempted voluntary manslaughter; using and discharging a firearm during and in relation to a crime of violence and aiding and abetting and causing an act to be done	
December 22, 2020	Evan Shawn Liberty	District of Columbia	September 5, 2019		Voluntary manslaughter; attempted voluntary manslaughter; using and discharging a firearm during and in relation to a crime of violence and aiding and abetting and causing an act to be done	
December 22, 2020	Dustin Laurent Heard	District of Columbia	September 5, 2019		Voluntary manslaughter; attempted voluntary manslaughter; using and discharging a firearm during and in relation to a crime of violence and aiding and abetting and causing an act to be done	
December 22, 2020	Ignacio Ramos	Western District of Texas	October 19, 2006	132 months' imprisonment; three years' supervised release; $2,000 fine; sentence commuted in 2009	Assault with a dangerous weapon, assault with serious bodily injury, discharge of firearm in commission of a crime of violence, tampering with official proceedings and deprivation of rights under color of law.	Ramos and Compean were Border Patrol Agents who attempted to subdue a drug smuggler in 2005. First physically hitting the individuals, then with service weapons. Upon the man's escape, they made efforts to cover up the crime and did not report it. Their sentences were commuted by President George W. Bush in 2009.
December 22, 2020	Jose Compean	Western District of Texas	October 19, 2006	144 months' imprisonment; three years' supervised release; $2,000 fine	Assault with a dangerous weapon, assault with serious bodily injury, discharge of firearm in commission of a crime of violence, tampering with official proceedings and deprivation of rights under color of law.	Ramos and Compean were Border Patrol Agents who attempted to subdue a drug smuggler in 2005. First physically hitting the individuals, then with service weapons. Upon the man's escape, they made efforts to cover up the crime and did not report it. Their sentences were commuted by President George W. Bush in 2009.
December 22, 2020	Alfred Lee Crum	Eastern District of Oklahoma	May 19, 1952	18 months' imprisonment, suspended; three years' probation; $250 fine	Illegally operating a still; unlawful possession of a still; operating without bond	Crum's criminal convictions were the result of his distillation of moonshine. His request was supported by former deputy attorney general Rod Rosenstein and the U.S. attorney for the Eastern District of Oklahoma Brian Kuester.
December 22, 2020	Alfonso Antonio Costa	Western District of Pennsylvania	March 20, 2008	Three years' probation, conditioned upon one year's home confinement and 100 hours' community service; $250,000 fine; $44,579.47 restitution	Health care fraud	Costa, a former Pittsburgh dentist-turned-developer who became a friend and business partner of Ben Carson, Trump's Secretary of Housing and Urban Development, pleaded guilty to making fraudulent oral surgery claims; he was sentenced in 2008.
December 22, 2020	Weldon Hal Angelos	District of Utah	November 16, 2004	660 months and one day's imprisonment (amended to time served); 36 months' supervised release	Possession with intent to distribute marijuana (five counts); possession of a firearm in furtherance of a drug trafficking crime (three counts); possession of a stolen firearm (two counts); possession of a firearm with a removed serial number; use of a controlled substance in possession of a firearm (two counts); money laundering (three counts)	In 2004, Angelos, a music producer from Sandy, Utah, was sentenced to 55 years in prison for selling marijuana while carrying a gun, although he never used it. The sentence was a mandatory minimum; the sentencing judge, Paul G. Cassell, wrote a lengthy opinion calling the sentence that the court was compelling to oppose "unjust and cruel and even irrational" and urging then-President George W. Bush to commute the sentence. Angelos was released in 2016 after serving 12 years in prison, after a court granted early release on the government's motion.
December 22, 2020	Phillip Kay Lyman	District of Utah	December 18, 2015	36 months' probation conditioned upon 10 days' incarceration; $1,000 fine; $95,955.61 restitution (December 18, 2015)	Conspiracy to operate off-road vehicles on public land closed to off-road vehicles; operation of off-road vehicle on public lands closed to off-road vehicles	Lyman, a Republican politician was a San Juan County, Utah, county commissioner at the time of the crime and a member of the Utah House of Representatives at the time of the pardon. He led an "ATV protest" in which about 50 ATV riders, seeking to challenge federal management of public lands, drove on the Recapture Canyon in a southeastern Utah, a site containing Native American cliff dwellings. The Bureau of Land Management had closed the area to motorized traffic. Lyman was convicted of misdemeanor trespassing in 2014 and sentenced in 2015. Upon Trump's grant of the pardon, the Trump White House issued a statement asserting that Lyman had been "subjected to selective prosecution."
December 22, 2020	Otis Gordon	District of South Carolina	January 11, 1993	85 or 86 months' imprisonment (as amended); 48 months' supervised release	Sell, distribute, or dispense a controlled substance	
December 23, 2020	Margaret E. Hunter	Southern District of California	August 24, 2020	Three years' probation conditioned upon eight months' home confinement	Conspiracy to commit offenses	Estranged wife of former U.S. Representative Duncan D. Hunter, whom Trump pardoned the previous day. Trump's earlier pardon of the ex-congressman drew criticism from local officials and from the federal prosecutor on the case for omitting the ex-congressman's wife, who had pleaded guilty and cooperated with prosecutors.
December 23, 2020	Charles Kushner	District of New Jersey	March 4, 2005	24 months in prison	Tax evasion, witness tampering, and making illegal campaign donations	Charles Kushner is a wealthy real estate executive and the father of Jared Kushner, Trump's son-in-law. After Charles Kushner learned that his brother-in-law was cooperating with federal investigators, Kushner hired a prostitute to lure the man into a motel room with a hidden camera, and sent the recording of the subsequent encounter to the man's wife (Kushner's sister) to retaliate against him. Then-U.S. Attorney Chris Christie called the case "one of the most loathsome, disgusting crimes" that he prosecuted. Kushner pleaded guilty to 18 counts, including tax evasion, witness tampering, and violating federal contribution regulations. He was sentenced to two years in prison (and ultimately ended up spending 14 months) and ordered to pay $508,900 to the FEC. After being released, Kushner returned to his real estate businesses.
December 23, 2020	Roger Stone	District of Columbia	February 20, 2020	40 months' imprisonment; 24 months' supervised release conditioned upon performance of 250 hours' community service; $20,000 fine	Making false statements to Congress (five counts), Witness tampering, Obstructing an official proceeding	Trump pardoned Stone, one of his campaign advisors, having already commuted his sentence six months earlier. Following the insurrection on January 6, 2021, Stone wanted a second pardon but did not receive one, and on a January 20 phone call he threatened to support the second impeachment of Trump.
December 23, 2020	Paul J. Manafort	(1) Eastern District of Virginia; (2) District of Columbia	(1) March 7, 2019; (2) March 13, 2019	(1) 47 months' imprisonment; three years' supervised release; $50,000 fine; $25,497,487.60 restitution (as amended by court order on March 21, 2019); (2) 73 months' imprisonment; 36 months' supervised release (concurrent); $6,164,032 restitution	Five counts of tax fraud, two counts of bank fraud, and one count of failing to disclose a hidden foreign bank account; two counts of conspiracy	Like Stone, Van der Zwaan, and Papadopoulos, Manafort—who was Trump's Presidential Campaign Chairman—was also prosecuted during the Mueller special counsel investigation. Manafort spent less than two years in prison, having been released to home detention in May 2020 as part of an effort to reduce prison populations during the COVID-19 pandemic. Because Trump's pardon was unconditional, the Department of Justice dropped a criminal forfeiture proceeding to obtain the properties held by Manafort: a Bridgehampton, Long Island mansion, an apartment in Chinatown, Manhattan, and a Brooklyn townhouse.
December 23, 2020	James J. Kassouf	Northern District of Ohio	December 6, 1999	One year's probation conditioned upon four months' home confinement; $10,000 fine; restitution in accordance with the plea agreement	Making a false tax return	
December 23, 2020	Mary McCarty	Southern District of Florida	June 4, 2009	42 months' imprisonment; three years supervised release; $100,000 fine	Conspiracy to commit honest services fraud	McCarty was elected five times to the Palm Beach County, Florida county commission starting in 1990. In 2009, she pleaded guilty to honest services fraud for directing municipal bond-underwriting transactions to her husband Kevin McCarty (d. 2018) and other associates, and for accepting items of value from a company she supported for a Palm Beach County Convention Center hotel contract. McCarty served 21 months of her 3.5-year sentence.
December 23, 2020	Christopher Wade	Southern District of New York	March 21, 2018	Sentence under seal (unknown)	Sealed offenses of conviction	The Trump White House said that Wade had been convicted of several "cyber-related offenses" and showed "remorse and sought to make his community a safer place."
December 23, 2020	Christopher II X (Christopher Anthony Bryant)	Eastern District of Arkansas	February 4, 1985 January 20, 1987	Three years' imprisonment; five years probation (1985) 407 days imprisonment; five years probation (1987)	Conspiracy to distribute cocaine (1985) Violation (1987)	A former cocaine offender, after his release, Christopher later became a prominent activist in Louisville, Kentucky, operating a youth nonprofit group. 2X was previously granted a full pardon for state crimes by then-Governor Matt Bevin. Supporters of 2X's request for federal executive clemency included Rand Paul and Tori Murden.
December 23, 2020	Christopher II X (Christopher Anthony Bryant)	Southern District of Indiana	September 26, 1986	33 days imprisonment	Violation	A former cocaine offender, after his release, Christopher later became a prominent activist in Louisville, Kentucky, operating a youth nonprofit group. 2X was previously granted a full pardon for state crimes by then-Governor Matt Bevin. Supporters of 2X's request for federal executive clemency included Rand Paul and Tori Murden.
December 23, 2020	Christopher II X (Christopher Anthony Bryant)	Western District of Kentucky	May 23, 1990 February 20, 1992	Three years and 120 days imprisonment (1990) 508 days imprisonment (1992)	Violation	A former cocaine offender, after his release, Christopher later became a prominent activist in Louisville, Kentucky, operating a youth nonprofit group. 2X was previously granted a full pardon for state crimes by then-Governor Matt Bevin. Supporters of 2X's request for federal executive clemency included Rand Paul and Tori Murden.
December 23, 2020	Cesar Agusto Lozada	Southern District of Florida	June 22, 2005	14 months imprisonment, three years supervised release	Conspiracy to distribute marijuana	
December 23, 2020	Joseph Martin Stephens	Western District of Texas	June 13, 2012	18 months' imprisonment; three years' supervised release; $2,500 fine	Probation revocation	In 2008, Stephens pleaded guilty to being a felon in possession a firearm, having previously been convicted of a felony in 1991, when he was 19 years old.
December 23, 2020	Andrew Barron Worden	Southern District of New York	August 15, 1995	Two years' probation conditioned upon 100 hours' community service per year and continued payment of balance owing to the Securities and Exchange Commission	Wire fraud	
December 23, 2020	Robert Coughlin	District of Columbia	November 24, 2009	Time served; three years probation conditioned upon 30 days in a halfway house and 200 hours of community service; $2,000 fine	Conflict of interest	
December 23, 2020	John Boultbee	Northern District of Illinois	February 10, 2011	329 days imprisonment (time already served); $500 fine, $15,000 restitution	Mail fraud	
December 23, 2020	Peter Y. Atkinson	Northern District of Illinois	December 10, 2007	345 days' imprisonment (time already served); three years' supervised release; $3,000 fine (as amended April 4, 2011)	Mail fraud	
December 23, 2020	Joseph Occhipinti	Southern District of New York	October 18, 1991	37 months' imprisonment (commuted to time served on January 15, 1993); two years' supervised release	Conspiracy to violate civil rights; deprivation of rights under color of law (10 misdemeanor counts); false statements (six counts)	Occhipinti, a former INS agent, was convicted of crimes related to the illegally detention and searches of Hispanic store owners in New York City and a subsequent cover-up effort. After he spent seven months in prison, his sentence was commuted by President George H. W. Bush in 1991.
December 23, 2020	Rebekah Kay Charleston	Eastern District of Texas	January 10, 2007	13 months' imprisonment; three years' supervised release; $1,000 fine	Conspiracy to commit tax evasion	Arrested in 2006 for tax evasion, Charleston later became an advocate for the victims of sex trafficking.
December 23, 2020	Rickey Ivan Kanter	Eastern District of Wisconsin	September 15, 2011	12 months and one day's imprisonment; two years' supervised release; $50,000 fine	Mail fraud	Kanter, the founder of the "Dr. Comfort" diabetic shoe company, was convicted of mail fraud in connection with an illegal Medicare reimbursement scheme. In addition to the criminal penalty, Kanter paid a multimillion-dollar civil penalty.
December 23, 2020	Topeka Kimberly Sam	Eastern District of Virginia	January 11, 2013	52 months' imprisonment (as amended by the Bureau of Prisons pursuant to court orders on March 5, 2014, and November 2, 2015); five years' supervised release	Conspiracy to possess with intent to distribute cocaine hydrochloride	Sam served three years of her sentence. She is a criminal justice reform advocate who pushed for enactment of the First Step Act.
December 23, 2020	James Harutun Batmasian	Southern District of Florida	July 11, 2008	Eight months' imprisonment; two years' supervised release	Willful failure to pay over tax	Batmasian, a South Florida real-estate investor and property management businessman influential in Boca Raton, pleaded guilty to failing to pay more than quarter-million in payroll tax owed.
December 23, 2020	William Plemons	Northern District of Georgia	July 1, 1998	12 months imprisonment; three years supervised release; $20,000 fine	Structuring transactions to avoid reporting requirements (four counts)	
December 23, 2020	William Plemons	Northern District of Georgia	August 26, 1999	27 months' imprisonment; three years' supervised release	Willfully attempting to evade personal income tax (three counts)	
December 23, 2020	William Plemons	Northern District of Georgia	May 29, 2002	27 months' imprisonment; two years' supervised release; $1,100,000 restitution	Wire fraud	
December 23, 2020	Russell Plaisance	Western District of Louisiana	November 18, 1987	Three years imprisonment; three years probation; three years special parole	Conspiracy to unlawfully import cocaine into the U.S.	Posthumous pardon.
December 23, 2020	Mark D. Siljander	Western District of Missouri	January 12, 2012	12 months and one day's imprisonment; six months' supervised release	Obstruction of justice; acting as an unregistered foreign agent	Siljander was a Republican congressman from 1981 to 1987, from a southwestern Michigan district. He pleaded guilty in 2010 to acting as an unregistered foreign agent in connection with his work for Islamic American Relief Agency, which hired him in early 2004 to lobby to get the organization removed from a list of Senate committee list of entities suspected of providing funding for terrorism. Siljander also pleaded guilty to obstruction of justice; prosecutors stated that he had falsely claimed payments from IARA were charitable donations. IARA closed in October 2004 after it was added to the Treasury Department's list of global terrorist organizations due to the group's links to Osama bin Laden, al-Qaida and the Taliban. Siljander was never charged with terrorism. In issuing the pardon, the Trump White House cited Siljander's anti-abortion record while a congressman and his post-prison work abroad. Trump's decision to pardon Siljander was criticized by Republican congressman Fred Upton, who succeeded Siljander after defeating him in the 1986 Republican primary.
December 23, 2020	Stephanie Christine Mohr	District of Maryland	December 11, 2001	120 months' imprisonment; two years' supervised release	Deprivation of rights under color of law	Mohr, a former Prince George's County, Maryland police officer and police dog handler, was convicted in 2001 of criminal deprivation of rights under color of law for directing her police dog to attack Ricardo G. Mendez, a homeless illegal immigrant, during an arrest in 1995. Mendez and his friend Jorge Herrara-Cruz were sleeping on the roof of a building when they were spotted by a police officer. The officer suspected the two men of being burglars since a number of reports had been made in the area. Six officers and a helicopter arrived at the scene. Mendez and Herrera-Cruz were surrounded in a semicircle against the building when Mohr released her dog. The dog bit at Mendez's legs and caused an injury which required 10 stitches. Mohr maintains that she believed Mendez was about to flee which caused her to let go of the leash. However, sergeant Dennis W. Bonn testified that the suspects were standing still with their hands up and admitted to granting permission for the attack when asked by Anthony Delozier, Mohr's senior officer. She served 10 years in prison. After Trump issued the pardon, the Washington Post published an op-ed by Alex Busansky, a member of the Justice Department Civil Rights Division team who prosecuted the case in 2001, who criticized the pardon as "odious" and wrote that it showed "the president's disdain, not just for the victims of police abuse, but for honest law enforcement officers who follow their training, see the humanity in all people, and do their job with respect and decency."
December 23, 2020	Gary Mark Brugman	Western District of Texas	March 10, 2003	27 months' imprisonment; two years' supervised release	Deprivation of rights under color of law	Brugman, a former U.S. Border Patrol agent, was convicted in 2002 of violating the civil rights of a man attempting to cross the border from Mexico into Texas. Court records showed that in January 2001, Brugman struck two men who were not resisting. Brugman denied wrongdoing, and his case became a cause célèbre among conservative figures.
December 23, 2020	John Frederick Tate	Southern District of Iowa	September 20, 2016	Two years' probation conditioned upon six months' home confinement and 160 hours' community service; $10,000 fine	Conspiracy to commit an offense against the United States; causing false records; causing false campaign contribution reports; false statements scheme	Benton and Tate were Ron Paul's campaign chairman and campaign manager, respectively, during Paul's unsuccessful 2012 campaign for the Republican presidential nomination. They were convicted at trial of concealing payments of $73,000 to state Senator Kent Sorenson in exchange for Sorenson's switching of his endorsement from Michele Bachmann to Paul ahead of the Iowa caucus. (The payments were disguised as "audio/visual expenses"). Senior U.S. District Judge Robert Pratt (who oversaw the criminal case against Sorenson) ridiculed Trump's pardon, saying, "It's not surprising that a criminal like Trump pardons other criminals."
December 23, 2020	Jesse R. Benton	Southern District of Iowa	September 20, 2016	Two years' probation conditioned upon six months' home confinement and 160 hours' community service; $10,000 fine (September 20, 2016)	Conspiracy to commit an offense against the United States; causing false records; causing false campaign contribution reports; false statements scheme	
January 13, 2021	Lynn Wade Barney	District of Utah	September 14, 2005	35 months' imprisonment; three years' supervised release	Possession of a firearm and ammunition by a convicted felon	Barney, of Enoch, Utah, was sentenced to 35 months in prison for being a felon in possession of a firearm (he had previously been convicted of a felony for marijuana distribution). He was released several years before the pardon.
January 13, 2021	Paul L. Behrens	Middle District of Florida	May 19, 2014	24 months' imprisonment; two years' supervised release	Making false statements relating to health care matters (two counts); health care fraud (two counts)	Behrens, Bereday, and Clay are respectively the former chief financial officer, general counsel, and vice president of Tampa, Florida-based WellCare Health Plans. All three were convicted of charges of making false statements in connection with a scheme to defraud Medicaid. Bereday and Clay also pleaded guilty to fraud.
January 13, 2021	Thaddeus M. S. Bereday	Middle District of Florida	November 22, 2017	Six months' imprisonment; three years' supervised release, conditioned upon 12 months' home detention; $50,000 fine	Making false statements relating to health care matters	Behrens, Bereday, and Clay are respectively the former chief financial officer, general counsel, and vice president of Tampa, Florida-based WellCare Health Plans. All three were convicted of charges of making false statements in connection with a scheme to defraud Medicaid. Bereday and Clay also pleaded guilty to fraud.
January 13, 2021	Peter E. Clay	Middle District of Florida	May 19, 2014	60 months' imprisonment, conditioned upon 200 hours' community service; $10,000 fine	Making false statements (two counts)	Behrens, Bereday, and Clay are respectively the former chief financial officer, general counsel, and vice president of Tampa, Florida-based WellCare Health Plans. All three were convicted of charges of making false statements in connection with a scheme to defraud Medicaid. Bereday and Clay also pleaded guilty to fraud.
January 13, 2021	Scott Conor Crosby	District of Arizona	May 24, 1993	60 months and two days' imprisonment; three years' supervised release	Bank robbery; use of a firearm during crime of violence	Along with a co-worker, Crosby committed a bank robbery in Arizona in 1992, at the age of 20. He spent five years in prison. After his release, he had a clean record, and became an emergency medical technician and a Mesa business operator.
January 13, 2021	Randall Harold "Duke" Cunningham	Southern District of California	March 3, 2006	100 months' imprisonment; three years' supervised release; $1,804,031.50 restitution	Conspiracy to commit crimes against the United States; tax evasion	Cunningham, a former seven-term Republican congressman from a San Diego, California-based district, pleaded guilty in 2005 to conspiracy and tax evasion for taking $2 million in bribes from defense contractors in exchange for federal contracts, possibly the largest bribery scandal in the history of the U.S. Congress (see Cunningham scandal). He served eight years in federal prison, and lived in Arkansas after his release. Cunningham kept a "bribe menu" on congressional stationery listing the payments military contractors should make to him in exchange for his help securing government contracts. The pardon is conditional and preserves Cunningham's court-ordered obligation to pay off the $3.6 million in restitution and forfeiture. Trump's pardon of Cunningham was condemned by the federal prosecutors who led the case, as well as others.
January 13, 2021	Paul Erickson	District of South Dakota	July 6, 2020	84 months' imprisonment; three years' supervised release; $2,976,937 restitution	Wire fraud; money laundering	Erickson, a Republican political operative, pleaded guilty to charges of wire fraud and money laundering; court records stated that he was part of schemes that bilked $5.3 million from 78 investors from 1996 to 2018, including a scheme involving fake housing in the Baaken oil fields in North Dakota. Erickson told investors that they would receive returns of up to 150%; he spent the money received from the scheme on personal expenses, including for Maria Butina, to whom Erickson was romantically linked. Butina was later revealed to be a Russian agent. Erickson was sentenced to seven years in prison, and was serving his sentence at the time Trump pardoned him. In issuing the pardon, Trump's White House asserted that Erickson had committed only a "minor financial crime." Trump's aide Kellyanne Conway advocated the pardon.
January 13, 2021	Todd S. Farha	Middle District of Florida	May 19, 2014	36 months' imprisonment; two years' supervised release; $50,000 fine	Health care fraud (two counts)	Farha is the former president and CEO of Tampa, Florida-based WellCare Health Plans; he was convicted in 2013 of fraud and making false statements in connection with a scheme to defraud Medicaid.
January 13, 2021	Thomas K. (Ken) Ford	Middle District of Illinois	April 10, 2003	Three years' probation; $2,000 fine	Violating mandatory safety standards; making false material statements and representations	Ford, who pleaded guilty in 2003 to making false statements to federal mining regulators, later became an executive at a Western Kentucky coal company.
January 13, 2021	Jessica Jean Frease (Jessica Jean Armstrong)	District of South Dakota	December 3, 2012	16 months' imprisonment (as amended); five years' supervised release; $3,300 restitution	Bank embezzlement	
January 13, 2021	Robert Cannon Hayes	Western District of North Carolina	August 19, 2020	One year's probation; $9,500 fine	False statements	Hayes, a former Republican congressman from North Carolina (1999–2009) and former chairman of the North Carolina Republican Party, pleaded guilty in 2019 to lying to the FBI regarding a scheme by Greg Lindberg, billionaire insurance businessman and political donor, to bribe Insurance Commission Mike Causey. In addition to Hayes, Lindberg and two of his associated were charged. Causey, who contacted law enforcement authorities and helped them investigate, was never accused of wrongdoing.
January 13, 2021	Gregory L. Jorgensen	District of South Dakota	July 3, 1996	24 months' imprisonment; two years' supervised release; $40,000 fine	Conspiracy; misbranding (10 counts); wire fraud (three counts); mail fraud (two counts)	Gregory, Deborah, and Martin Jorgensen were South Dakotans who in 1996 were convicted of knowingly selling misbranded beef. Gregory Jorgensen was subsequently elected to the Tripp County Board of Commissioners. Martin Jorgensen's pardon was posthumous.
January 13, 2021	Deborah L. Jorgensen	District of South Dakota	July 3, 1996	12 months and one day of imprisonment; two years' supervised release; $20,000 fine	Conspiracy; misbranding (10 counts); wire fraud (three counts); mail fraud (two counts)	Gregory, Deborah, and Martin Jorgensen were South Dakotans who in 1996 were convicted of knowingly selling misbranded beef. Gregory Jorgensen was subsequently elected to the Tripp County Board of Commissioners. Martin Jorgensen's pardon was posthumous.
January 13, 2021	Martin Frederick Jorgensen	District of South Dakota	July 3, 1996	15 months' imprisonment; two years' supervised release; $40,000 fine	Conspiracy; misbranding (10 counts)	Gregory, Deborah, and Martin Jorgensen were South Dakotans who in 1996 were convicted of knowingly selling misbranded beef. Gregory Jorgensen was subsequently elected to the Tripp County Board of Commissioners. Martin Jorgensen's pardon was posthumous.
January 13, 2021	William L. Kale	Middle District of Florida	May 19, 2014	12 months and one day's imprisonment; one year's supervised release	Health care fraud (two counts)	Kale is the former vice president of Tampa, Florida-based WellCare Health Plans; he was convicted in 2013 of fraud and making false statements in connection with a scheme to defraud Medicaid.
January 13, 2021	Frederick J. Nahas	District of New Jersey	January 2, 2003	One month's imprisonment; three years' supervised release; and a $20,000 fine	Obstruction of justice in a health care investigation	Nahas, a surgeon from Somers Point, New Jersey, pleaded guilty in 2002 to obstruction of justice in connection with his concealment of documents that had been subpoenaed in an investigation. He spent one month in prison in 2003, and was also sentenced to two months of weekend confinement in a halfway house, three months of home confinement, and a fine of $20,000. Nahas's pardon was supported by Republican congressman Jeff Van Drew, to whose campaign Nahas had donated $3,000.
January 13, 2021	John Michael Nystrom	District of South Dakota	July 20, 2009	Two years' probation, conditioned upon 100 hours' community service; $5,000 fine; $20,514.64 restitution	Misprision of a felony	
January 13, 2021	Amy Ralston Povah	Western District of Texas	February 27, 1992	292 months' imprisonment; five years' supervised release; a $10,000 fine	Conspiracy to distribute a controlled substance; conspiracy to import a controlled substance; money laundering	Povah served 9 years of a 24-year sentence for ecstasy offenses. Her sentence was commuted in 2000 by President Bill Clinton before her 2021 pardon from Trump. After her release, she founded the CAN-DO Foundation (Calling for All Nonviolent Drug Offenders) Foundation, a criminal justice reform organization.
January 13, 2021	David Francis Rowland	District of South Carolina	January 29, 1997	Two years' probation	Federal enforcement procedures (two counts)	
January 13, 2021	Joshua James Smith	Middle District of Tennessee	August 27, 1998	60 months' imprisonment; five years' supervised release; $12,500 fine	Conspiracy to possess and distribute marijuana; conspiracy to possess and distribute cocaine	
January 13, 2021	David Tamman	Central District of California	September 23, 2013	84 months' imprisonment; three years' supervised release; and a $2,500 fine	Conspiracy to obstruct justice; destruction, alteration, falsification of records, aiding and abetting, causing an act to be done; accessory after the fact; obstruction of justice, aiding and abetting	Tamman, a former partner at the law firms Nixon Peabody and Greenberg Traurig, was convicted of 2012 for conspiring with a client to obstruct a U.S. Securities and Exchange Commission investigation into a $22 million Ponzi scheme. Tamman was fired by the law firms and disbarred by the State Bar of California in 2016. Alan Dershowitz, who was one of Trump's lawyers, represented Tamman in his unsuccessful appeal. Convicted in 2012, Tamman was released from prison in February 2019. His pardon was supported by the Aleph Institute, which was influential in Trump's clemency decisionmaking; the Trump White House also stated that former FBI director Louis Freeh and former federal prosecutor Kendall Coffey supported the pardon.
January 19, 2021	Alex Adjmi	(1) District of Connecticut; (2) Eastern District of New York	(1) November 7, 1996; (2) June 22, 1998	(1) 48 months' imprisonment; three years' supervised release, conditioned upon 600 hours' community service; $125,000 fine; (2) Three years' supervised release (concurrent); $15,000 fine; $4,500 restitution (as amended)	(1) Money laundering; (2) Conspiracy to commit insurance fraud	
January 19, 2021	Fred Keith Alford	Northern District of Oklahoma	January 17, 1977	One year of unsupervised probation	Firearms violation (interstate sale of firearm by federal firearms licensee)	
January 19, 2021	Mahmoud Reza Banki	Southern District of New York	May 5, 2014	$5,000 fine	False statements (two counts, as amended on appeal)	In 2010, Banki, an Iran-born naturalized U.S. citizen, was sentenced to 30 months' imprisonment for violating U.S. sanctions laws by transferring about $3.3 million between Iran and the United States through the hawala system. He served 665 days before being released, after his sanctions conviction was vacated on appeal (his conviction for making a false statement was upheld). In announcing the pardon, the Trump White House cited Banki's doctorate from Princeton University, his community work and "sincere love and respect for the United States" and support from Senator Dianne Feinstein, Representative John Lewis, and others.
January 19, 2021	Stephen Bannon	Southern District of New York	N/A		Conspiracy to commit wire fraud; conspiracy to commit money laundering	Trump pardoned Bannon, a former top 2016 campaign advisor to Trump and his former White House chief strategist, after Bannon was arrested and indicted in August 2020 on charges of misappropriating money donated to the "We Build the Wall" organization for personal expenses. Bannon had pleaded not guilty and had not yet been brought to trial when Trump issued the pardon. Bannon and Trump had a strained relationship after Bannon left the White House in August 2017; Bannon had criticized Trump's son, and Trump responded by publicly disparaging Bannon. But Bannon returned to Trump's favor after he supported Trump's failed re-election campaign and Trump's efforts to overturn the election. Trump did not pardon Bannon's co-defendants: Brian Kolfage, Andrew Badolato, and Timothy Shea, all of whom pleaded not guilty.
January 19, 2021	Faustino Bernadett	Central District of California	January 17, 2020	15 months' imprisonment (surrender ordered February 26, 2021); one year's supervised release; $60,000 fine	Misprison of a felony	Bernadett, a physician and former owner of the Pacific Hospital in Long Beach, California, pleaded guilty in 2019 to failing to report a years-long health care fraud that scammed the California worker's compensation system of millions of dollars. Bernadett was sentenced to 15 months in federal prison; he was pardoned before he served prison time, which had been delayed due to his poor health and the COVID-19 pandemic. In announcing the pardon, the Trump White House referred to Bernadett's charitable work and noted that he did not initiate the kickback scheme.
January 19, 2021	Carl Andrew Boggs III	Western District of North Carolina	November 23, 2015	30 months in prison, two years of supervised release and $15,000 fine	Conspiracy to defraud the United States Department of Transportation and money laundering	His paving business, Boggs Paving Inc, accepted a contract with South Carolina Department of Transportation to widen Interstate 26 through Lexington and Calhoun counties in 2013. Following the mismanaged project, Boggs and four of his employees were convicted of crimes related to the use of a disadvantaged business enterprise to obtain $88 million in government contracts.
January 19, 2021	Todd Boulanger	District of Columbia	October 14, 2011	30 days' imprisonment; 24 months' supervised release; $4,000 fine	Conspiracy to commit honest services wire fraud	
January 19, 2021	Robert Douglas Bowker	Middle District of Florida	March 19, 1993	Two years' probation	Wildlife smuggling	Bowker, of New York, was convicted in 1993 of wildlife trafficking for illegally arranging the delivery of 22 Timber rattlesnakes to the Miami Serpentarium (a tourist attraction in South Florida) in a swap with Rudy "Cobra King" Komarek for 22 American alligators. He was sentenced to two years' probation.
January 19, 2021	Elliott Broidy	District of Columbia	N/A		Conspiracy to serve as an unregistered agent of a foreign principal	Broidy, a California businessman and Republican fundraiser, was a major donor to Trump's 2016 presidential campaign and Trump's inauguration, and was also a deputy finance chairman for the Republican National Committee. He pleaded guilty in October 2020 to conspiring to violate foreign lobbying laws by accepting $9 million from Jho Low, a fugitive Malaysian businessman, in order to influence the Trump administration's Justice Department to drop its investigation into fraud and embezzlement at the Malaysian sovereign wealth fund 1MDB (see 1Malaysia Development Berhad scandal), and by seeking to extradite wealthy Chinese billionaire Guo Wengui from the United States as part of a bid to get payoffs from China and the United Arab Emirates. As part of his guilty plea, Broidy admitted that he knowingly failed to register as a foreign agent and agreed to forfeit $6.6 million. Broidy faced a sentencing hearing in February 2021 before Trump pardoned him on his last full day in office. Trump did not pardon Nickie Lum Davis, a Hawaii businesswoman who had pleaded guilty to aiding and abetting Broidy's crimes, and who had cooperated with the government; Lum Davis's attorney called Trump's decision to grant clemency to Broidy, but not his less culpable underling, "incomprehensible" and unjust.
January 19, 2021	Drew Kallman "Bo" Brownstein	Southern District of New York	January 11, 2012	One year and one day of imprisonment; three years' supervised release, conditioned on 500 hours' community service; $7,500 fine	Securities fraud (insider trading)	Brownstein, a hedge fund operator and son of prominent Denver, Colorado attorney and lobbyist Norman Brownstein, pleaded guilty in 2012 to insider trading. His company made a $2.44 million profit from a trade in energy companies that he made after learning about a pending corporate acquisition from a friend.
January 19, 2021	Tommaso Buti	Southern District of New York	N/A		Conspiracy to defraud the United States; fraud by wire, radio, or television (35 counts); scheme to defraud: money, state tax stamps (transportation of stolen property (14 counts); money laundering - racketeering (laundering monetary instruments conspiracy)	Buti, a prominent restaurateur, had partnered with Trump in the late 1990s on Trump Management, a modeling agency. He was subsequently investigated on allegations of stealing from his chain of restaurants, and was indicted in 2000. Buti denied wrongdoing and was tried and acquitted on similar charges in his native Italy. He was never extradited to New York to stand trial on the U.S. charges, and Trump's pardon terminated the still-open case against him.
January 19, 2021	Dwayne Michael Carter Jr. (Lil Wayne)	Southern District of New York	N/A		Possession of firearm and ammunition by a convicted felon	Carter, a rapper who performs under the name Lil Wayne, pleaded guilty in December 2020 to being a felon in possession of a firearm (specifically, a gold-plated .45-caliber Glock).
January 19, 2021	Robert William Cawthon	Northern District of Texas	May 22, 1992	Three years' probation, conditioned upon 180 days' home confinement	False statement on bank loan application	
January 19, 2021	David Lamar Clanton	Northern District of Mississippi	September 20, 1995	10 months' imprisonment; three years' supervised release; $123,398.31 restitution	False, fictitious, or fraudulent claims; aiding and abetting in making false, fictitious, and fraudulent statements and representations	
January 19, 2021	Jeffrey Alan Conway	Western District of Pennsylvania	November 25, 2003	13 months' imprisonment; two years' supervised release; $20,000 fine	Conspiracy to commit offenses against the United States	Conway was the chief financial officer of Rent-Way Inc., a rental purchase chain. In 2003, he pleaded guilty to conspiracy to falsify accounting records, and was released from prison the next year. He subsequently became a restaurateur based in Charlotte, North Carolina.
January 19, 2021	Robert S. Corkern	Northern District of Mississippi	November 13, 2012	3 years of supervised release	Aiding and abetting in bribery involving federal programs	In 2007 Corkern paid $25,000 to a Panola County administrator to secure a $400,000 payment to the Tri-Lakes Medical Center to which Corkern's business, Batesville Hospital Management, provided services. The Trump White House press release said that the pardon was supported by Republican U.S. Senators Roger Wicker and Cindy Hyde-Smith of Mississippi; and Phil Bryant, the Republican former governor of Mississippi.
January 19, 2021	Steven Benjamin Floyd	Southern District of Mississippi	January 3, 2008	30 months (the last six to be served in a halfway house); three years' supervised release; $2,500 fine	Bank robbery by extortion	
January 19, 2021	Duncan Fordham	Southern District of Georgia	September 15, 2005	52 months' imprisonment; three years' supervised release; $1,021,888 restitution	Health care fraud	Fordham was an Augusta, Georgia pharmacist convicted in 2005 of his involvement in a health care fraud scheme. Under the scheme, Fordham would obtain contracts to operate the pharmacy of Community Mental Health Center of East Central Georgia, and then give a third of his large bonus in kickbacks to former State Representative Robin L. Williams.
January 19, 2021	Clarence Olin Freeman	District of South Carolina	October 29, 1965	Nine months' imprisonment; five years' probation	Conspiracy to violate interstate revenue laws; dealing in illegal whiskey; possession of illegal whiskey	
January 19, 2021	George Gilmore	District of New Jersey	January 22, 2020	12 months and one day's imprisonment; three years' supervised release	Two counts of failing to pay payroll taxes to the IRS and one count of making false statements on a bank loan application	Gilmore was the former chairman of the Ocean County, New Jersey Republican Party, and a power broker in New Jersey Republican politics. He was convicted by a jury in 2019, but maintained that he was innocent and contended that his failure to make timely payments owed to the IRS was attributable to a hoarding disorder. He was sentenced in 2020, but was free on bail pending the appeal. Bill Stepien, Trump's former campaign manager and a longtime associate of Gilmore's, lobbied for the pardon, which was supported by other influential New Jersey figures, such as Chris Christie, Jim McGreevey, Jim Florio, Donald DiFrancesco, Kim Guadagno, and Tom MacArthur.
January 19, 2021	Steven Samuel Grantham	Central District of California	June 13, 1967	Four months' imprisonment; two years' supervised release	Interstate transportation of a stolen vehicle	
January 19, 2021	Joey Murray Hancock	Northern District of Mississippi	February 16, 2010	24 months' imprisonment; five years' supervised release	Conspiracy to possess with intent to distribute in excess of 50 grams of a mixture and substance containing a detectable amount of methamphetamine	
January 19, 2021	Wesley Scott Harkonen Jr.	Northern District of California	April 13, 2011	Three years' probation, conditioned upon six months' home confinement and 200 hours' community service; $20,000 fine (as amended)	Wire fraud and aiding and abetting	
January 19, 2021	James Austin Hayes, IV	Western District of North Carolina	January 28, 2014	One year's probation	Insider trading conspiracy	Hayes was one of several people convicted of particiting in an insider trading ring that operated between 2010 and 2012 led by a Wells Fargo employee who disclosed confidential information about impending mergers.
January 19, 2021	Gary E. Hendler	Eastern District of North Carolina	October 30, 1984	Three years' probation	Conspiracy to distribute and dispense methaqualone	
January 19, 2021	William E. "Ed" Henry	Middle District of Alabama	May 2, 2019	Two years' probation; $4,000 fine	Theft of government property	Henry was a former Republican member of the Alabama House of Representatives. He pleaded guilty in January 2019 to aiding and abetting theft of government property in connection with his involvement in a Medicare fraud scheme. Alabama's Republican U.S. Senator, Tommy Tuberville, supported the pardon.
January 19, 2021	Abel Holtz	Southern District of Florida	January 20, 1995	45 days' imprisonment; two years' supervised release, conditioned upon an unspecified term of home confinement and community service; $20,000 fine (as amended)	Obstruction of justice	Holtz, an influential Miami, Florida banker and philanthropist who founded Capital Bank, pleaded guilty in October 1994 to lying to a federal grand jury about paying tens of thousands of dollars in bribes to Alex Daoud, a corrupt city commissioner (and later mayor) of Miami Beach. Holtz's previous 2006 pardon application was denied by President George W. Bush.
January 19, 2021	Douglas Jemal	District of Columbia	April 16, 2007	Five years' probation; $175,000 fine	Wire fraud	Jemal, age 79 at the time of the pardon, was an influential Washington, D.C., real estate developer who was convicted of wire fraud in 2006 in connection with an efforts to influence a local government official to obtain profitable government leases. Jemal's leasing chief and two other employees were also convicted on varying charges. Jemal has been a major political donor to both parties over the years, and is a friend of Jared Kushner; he donated $100,000 to the Republican National Committee in 2020. In issuing the pardon, the White House referred to Jemal's charitable work and said he was "credited with rebuilding many urban inner cities." Trump did not grant pardons to Jemal's underlings; this was criticized by the lead prosecutor on the case, who said that the subordinates were "far less culpable" than Jemal and that the pardon sent a message "that there are two standards of accountability: One for the wealthy and well-connected, and one for everyone else."
January 19, 2021	James E. Johnson Jr.	Eastern District of North Carolina	March 11, 2008	One year's probation; $7,500 fine	Hunting over bait and aiding and abetting the same; killing migratory game bird without retaining in actual custody	Johnson, of Virginia, unlawfully baited and killed migratory birds in Pamlico County, North Carolina, in 2007, and pleaded guilty to the offense the following year.
January 19, 2021	Amir B. Khan	District of Hawaii	August 26, 2019	Three years' probation, conditioned upon 360 days' home detention, 1,500 hours' community service, and $6,500 restitution	Wire fraud (19 counts)	
January 19, 2021	Kenneth Kurson (Jayden Wagner, Eddie Train)	Eastern District of New York	N/A		Interstate stalking and harassment	Kurson, an ally of the Trump family, was appointed the editor-in-chief of The New York Observer in 2013 by Trump's son-in-law Jared Kushner, who at the time owned the newspaper. Kurson and Kushner became close friends. Kurson also wrote a speech for Trump in his 2016 campaign, and was a longtime associate of Rudy Giuliani, Trump's lawyer. In October 2020, Kurson was charged with cyberstalking three people and harassing two other people. He was pardoned on the last full day of Trump's term, before he could stand trial.
January 19, 2021	Anthony Scott Levandowski	Northern District of California	August 4, 2020	18 months' imprisonment; three years' supervised release; $95,000 fine; $756,499.22 restitution	Theft and attempted theft of trade secrets	Levandowski, age 40 at the time of the pardon, stole trade secrets from Google's autonomous vehicle company Waymo, where he was an engineer, after he had left the company and was negotiating a position at Uber; Levandowski pleaded guilty as part of a plea deal, and was sentenced in August 2020 to 18 months' imprisonment. Levandowski's request for a pardon was supported by billionaire Trump ally Peter Thiel, as well as others.
January 19, 2021	Michael A. Liberty	District of Maine	August 9, 2017	Four months' imprisonment; one year's supervised release; $100,000 fine	Political contributions in the names of others and aiding and abetting	Liberty is a former Maine developer who pleaded guilty in 2016 to unlawfully donating $22,500 in 2011 to the primary campaign of Republican presidential candidate Mitt Romney in violation of the federal campaign contribution limit ($2,500). He was sentenced to four months' imprisonment, one year of supervised release, and $100,000 fine, and was released from federal prison in 2018. In subsequent years, he donated to Republican organizations and Trump's campaign. A federal grand jury in 2019 indicted him and an associate on charges of scamming $50 million from investors; they have pleaded not guilty. At the time of the pardon, Liberty was living in Florida.
January 19, 2021	Brian Lyle McSwain	District of South Carolina	May 7, 1993 (as amended June 7 and June 19, 1994)	18 months' imprisonment, including approximately four months' community confinement; three years' supervised release	Conspiracy to possess with intent to distribute and to distribute marijuana and cocaine	McSwain was a Greenville, South Carolina police officer who pleaded guilty in 1993 to involvement in a cocaine trafficking conspiracy, in which he was one of 26 co-defendants, including Richard Riley Jr., the son of former South Carolina Governor Richard Riley. U.S. Senator Lindsey Graham of South Carolina sought the pardon for McSwain.
January 19, 2021	Hal Knudson Mergler	Northern District of West Virginia	July 21, 1992 (as amended November 19, 1993)	One month of imprisonment; three years' supervised release; $505 restitution	Conspiracy to possess with intent to distribute and to distribute LSD (lysergic acid diethylamide)	
January 19, 2021	David Eugene Miller	Middle District of Tennessee	November 19, 2012	30 months' imprisonment; two years' supervised release	Making a false statement to a bank (as amended)	
January 19, 2021	Glen Moss	District of Connecticut	June 9, 2000	Three years' probation, conditioned upon cooperation with the IRS in resolving $100,000 in unpaid taxes for the years 1991 and 1992; $4,000 fine	Payment to non-licensed physician; attempt to evade or defeat tax	Moss, a member of the Trump's golf club in Westchester County, New York, was listed as donating $10,000 to the Trump Foundation in 2008. Trump pardoned him for his involvement in a health-care fraud scheme.
January 19, 2021	Hillel "Helly" Nahmad	Southern District of New York	April 30, 2014	One year and one day's imprisonment; three years' supervised release, conditioned upon 300 hours' community service; $30,000 fine (April 30, 2014)	Illegal gambling	Helly Nahmad is a Madison Avenue art dealer who is a member of the wealthy Nahmad family and son of the noted art collector David Nahmad. The younger Nahmad owns the entirety of Trump Tower's 51st floor, reportedly purchased at the cost of $21 million. He pleaded guilty to organizing an illegal $100 million gambling ring with suspected links to Russian organized crime out of Trump Tower. His art gallery in New York's Carlyle Hotel was raided by federal agents in 2013; Nahmad later pleaded guilty and was sentenced in 2014. He was also ordered to forfeit $6.4 million in earnings. Alimzhan Tokhtakhunov was indicted in connection with the case, but was never arrested.
January 19, 2021	Stephen Odzer (Harold J. Odzer)	Eastern District of New York	May 3, 2007	18 months' imprisonment; five years' supervised release; $16,150,017.83 restitution (as amended on June 5, 2007)	Bank fraud	Odzer pleaded guilty of defrauding three banks of $16 million but cooperated as a witness in another case.
January 19, 2021	Benedict Guthrie Olberding	District of South Carolina	April 11, 2013	Five years' probation; $614,154.37 restitution	Bank fraud	Olberding was a mortgage broker in North Carolina who, along with a co-defendant, arranged loans with financial institutions between 2007 and 2009 with fraudulent information.
January 19, 2021	Eric Wesley Patton	Eastern District of Tennessee	February 23, 1999	$1,000 fine	Making false statement	
January 19, 2021	Desiree Perez (Desiree Reynoso)	Southern District of Florida	(1) September 7, 1995; (2) April 6, 1999	(1) Five years' probation (as amended); (2) Nine months' imprisonment; three years' supervised release	(1) Conspiracy to distribute cocaine; (2) Probation violation	Perez is the CEO of Roc Nation; she was convicted of a drug crime in the 1990s.
January 19, 2021	Johnny D. Phillips Jr.	Eastern District of Tennessee	November 2, 2016	30 months' imprisonment; three years' supervised release; $14,092,205.04 restitution (as amended)	Conspiracy to commit wire fraud and mail fraud	
January 19, 2021	Richard George (Rick) Renzi	Southern District of Arizona	October 28, 2013	36 months' imprisonment; three years supervised release; $25,000 fine	Conspiracy to commit extortion, attempted extortion and wire and mail fraud; honest wire services wire fraud (six counts); conspiracy to commit money laundering; concealment of money laundering; transactions with criminally derived funds (two counts); extortion under color of official right (two counts); conspiracy to make false statement; insurance fraud (two counts); racketeering	Renzi, a former Republican congressman from 2003 to 2009 from a northeastern Arizona district, was convicted in 2013 on 17 federal counts, including racketeering, money laundering, extortion, and filing false statements with regulators. He served three years in prison and was released in 2017. Renzi denied wrongdoing and insisted that the prosecution was politically motivated.
January 19, 2021	Gregory Louis Reyes	Northern District of California	June 24, 2010	18 months' imprisonment; two years' supervised release; $15 million fine	Conspiracy to commit securities and mail fraud; fraud in connection with Brocade stock, aiding, abetting and willfully causing; false SEC filing, aiding, abetting and willfully causing (three counts); falsifying books, records and accounts, aiding, abetting and willfully causing; false statement to accountant, aiding, abetting and willfully causing (four counts)	Reyes was the first person to be convicted of an offense related to options backdating. As CEO of Brocade Communications Systems, he falsified financial records and made false statements to accountants between 2000 and 2004 regarding stock option compensation.
January 19, 2021	Aviem Sella	Northern District of Columbia	N/A		Espionage - conspiracy to gather or deliver national defense information (two counts); violation of Subversive Activities Control Act - receiving or obtaining classified information by foreign agent	Sella was an Israeli Air Force officer and Mossad operative who recruited and handled Jonathan Pollard, an American naval intelligence analyst who spied for Israel. Shortly before Pollard was arrested, Sella fled the U.S. He was indicted for espionage in 1987, but was never extradited to stand trial. The Trump White House said that Sella's petition for a pardon was requested by the Israeli government and supported by Miriam Adelson, the wife of conservative mega-donor Sheldon Adelson.
January 19, 2021	Robert C. Sherrill	Middle District of Tennessee	July 27, 2009	50 months' imprisonment; four years' supervised release	Cocaine distribution	Sherrill served five years in federal prison for cocaine distribution; after his release, he became a Nashville, Tennessee businessman, entrepreneur, non-profit founder, and author. Sherrill was previously pardoned in 2019 by Governor Bill Haslam. His pardon was supported by congressman Mark E. Green.
January 19, 2021	Syrita Rashida Steib-Martin	Eastern District of Texas	July 24, 2000	120 months' imprisonment; three years' supervised release; $1,934,169.31 restitution	Use of fire to commit a felony	In 2000, Steib was convicted for her involvement in an auto theft that culminated in the burning of a Tyler, Texas car dealership; she was released from prison in 2009 after serving nine years.
January 19, 2021	Patrick Lee Swisher	Western District of North Carolina	October 15, 2002	30 months' imprisonment; two years' supervised release; $5,000 fine	Fraudulent tax return/statement and making false statements	Swisher, the founder of Swisher Hygiene, was convicting of failing to report $1.9 million in stock sales on his 1996 and 1997 tax returns.
January 19, 2021	Casey Urlacher	Northern District of Illinois	N/A		Conspiracy to defraud the United States; illegal gambling; money laundering	Casey Urlacher is the mayor of Mettawa, Illinois, and the younger brother of former Chicago Bears player Brian Urlacher, who visited the Trump White House in March 2020 and contributed to Republican and Trump's campaigns and Republican organizations. In February 2020, Casey Urlacher was indicted on two counts of conspiring to engage in illegal offshore gambling in connection with his recruitment of bettors for a Costa Rica-based website in exchange for a cut of the proceeds. Urlacher was one of 10 people charged in the federal grand jury indictment; none of the others received pardons. The Republican leader in the Illinois State Senate, Dan McConchie, who defeated Urlacher in a 2016 primary election, criticized the pardon of an indicted defendant who had not yet been convicted, saying: "Pardons should be done on the merits of the case, not based on a relationship with the President. This sort of practice undermines the public's faith in our system. We're supposed to be a nation of laws, not one based on people getting benefits just because of who they know."
January 19, 2021	John Harold Wall	District of Minnesota	June 4, 1992	60 months' imprisonment; four years' supervised release	Possession of methamphetamine with intent to distribute	Wall, age 63 at the time of the pardon, of Prior Lake, Minnesota, pleaded guilty to a methamphetamine offense in 1992; as part of a plea agreement, a count of using a firearm during a drug-trafficking offense was dismissed. Wall completed his prison sentence in 1996. The White House press release announcing the pardon said that it was supported by former Deputy Attorney General Rod Rosenstein; Andrew M. Luger, the former U.S. Attorney for Minnesota; and the Office of the Pardon Attorney.
January 19, 2021	Robert Zangrillo	District of Massachusetts	N/A		Conspiracy to commit mail and wire fraud and honest services mail and wire fraud; conspiracy to commit federal programs bribery; money laundering conspiracy; wire fraud and honest services wire fraud (six counts); federal programs bribery (two counts); filing a false tax return	Zangrillo is a prominent Miami businessman and the founder of the private investment firm Dragon Global. He was arrested in March 2019 and charged with taking part in the Varsity Blues college admissions bribery scheme by paying $250,000 to get his daughter accepted as a transfer student to the University of Southern California (USC). Zangrillo pleaded not guilty, and prior to the pardon, he was set to stand trial in September 2021. The White House said that the pardon was supported by USC alumnus and university trustee Thomas J. Barrack Jr., a longtime Trump friend who chaired his inauguration committee. However, Barrack denied involvement in the pardon.
January 20, 2021	Albert J. (Al) Pirro Jr.	Southern District of New York	November 1, 2000	29 months' imprisonment; three years' supervised release; $62,446 restitution	Conspiracy to defraud the United States; tax evasion (four counts); fraud (29 counts)	Pirro, a former power broker in New York Republican politics, is the former husband of Jeanine Pirro, the Fox News host and consistent Trump ally.

=== Commutations ===
During Trump's first term, he issued 94 commutations: 1 in 2017, 3 in 2018, 2 in 2019, 18 in 2020, and 70 in January 2021.

Date of commutation	Name	Court	Sentencing date	Sentence	Offense	Notes
December 20, 2017	Sholom Rubashkin	Northern District of Iowa	June 22, 2010	324 months' imprisonment; five years' supervised release; $26,852,152.51 restitution	Bank fraud (14 counts); false statements and reports to a bank (24 counts); wire fraud (14 counts); mail fraud (nine counts); money laundering and aiding and abetting (10 counts); willful violation of order of Secretary of Agriculture and aiding and abetting (15 counts)	Rubashkin was the chief executive of Agriprocessors, a large meatpacking corporation. The company's plant in Postville, Iowa, once the U.S.'s largest kosher meatpacking operation, was the raided by immigration agents in 2008, and almost 400 undocumented workers, including several children, were detained. Rubashkin was convicted of bank fraud and related offenses for fabricating collateral for loans; prosecutors said that as a result of Rubashkin's conduct, banks lost more than $26 million. After his fraud conviction, the immigration-related charges against Rubashkin were dropped; some of the plant's managers and supervisors were convicted of harboring illegal immigrants (a felony) and approximately 300 employees at the plant (mostly Guatemalans) were convicted of identity theft. The commutation released Rubashkin from prison 19 years earlier than planned, but left in place a term of supervised release and a substantial restitution obligation.
June 6, 2018	Alice Marie Johnson	Western District of Tennessee	March 21, 1997	Life imprisonment; five years' supervised release (March 21, 1997)	Conspiracy to possess cocaine, attempted possession of cocaine, money laundering	Johnson was convicted in 1996 for her involvement in a Memphis cocaine trafficking organization and sentenced to life imprisonment. Trump commuted Johnson's sentence following a meeting with Kim Kardashian; the commutation of the sentence caused Johnson's release from prison after more than 21 years.
July 10, 2018	Dwight Lincoln Hammond Jr.	District of Oregon	October 30, 2012	3 months' imprisonment; 3 years' supervised release; amended to 60 months' imprisonment on October 7, 2015	Use of fire to damage and destroy property of the United States (one count for Dwight, two counts for Steven)	In addition to the full pardon on the same day, Trump commuted the Hammonds' arson prison sentences to time served, and ordered their immediate release.
July 10, 2018	Steven Dwight Hammond	District of Oregon	October 30, 2012	12 months and one day's imprisonment; 3 years' supervised release; amended to 60 months' imprisonment on October 7, 2015	Use of fire to damage and destroy property of the United States (one count for Dwight, two counts for Steven)	In addition to the full pardon on the same day, Trump commuted the Hammonds' arson prison sentences to time served, and ordered their immediate release.
July 29, 2019	Ronen Nahmani	Southern District of Florida	October 9, 2015	240 months' imprisonment; three years' supervised release	Conspiracy to possess with intent to distribute controlled substances and controlled substance analogues	Nahmani, an Israel-born Florida resident, was convicted in 2015 of conspiracy to distribute synthetic drugs acquired from China, and was sentenced to 20 years' imprisonment. Hakeem Jeffries, Mark Meadows, and Alan Dershowitz supported Nahmani's clemency request. In commuting Nahmani, the Trump White House cited his lack of a previous criminal history, his five young children, and the terminal illness of his wife.
July 29, 2019	Theodore E. (Ted) Suhl	Eastern District of Arkansas	October 27, 2016	84 months' imprisonment; three years' supervised release; $200,000 fine	Aiding and abetting honest services wire fraud (two counts); aiding and abetting bribery concerning programs receiving federal funds; aiding and abetting Travel Act	Suhl formerly operated faith-based behavioral healthcare treatment centers for juveniles in Arkansas, including a residential center called Lord's Ranch (later renamed Trinity Behavioral Health) and several outpatient centers. He was convicted in 2016 on four counts of bribery in connection with a scheme from 2007 to 2011 to increase Medicaid payments to his company through payments made a state Arkansas Department of Human Services official (an ex-state legislator) via an intermediary. Both the official and the intermediary were also prosecuted and sentenced to federal prison. In a statement, the White House said that Trump's decision to commute the sentence was influenced by support from former Arkansas governor Mike Huckabee and former U.S. attorney Bud Cummins.
February 18, 2020	Rod Blagojevich	Northern District of Illinois	December 7, 2011	14 years in prison; two years' supervised release; $20,000 fine	wire fraud (10 counts); conspiracy/attempted extortion (four counts); corrupt solicitation of funds; conspiracy to corruptly solicit funds (two counts); making false statements	Blagojevich, a Democrat, was a former governor of Illinois and a contestant on Trump's reality TV show, The Celebrity Apprentice. Convicted of attempting to sell the Senate seat vacated by Barack Obama, plus extortion by withholding state funds being directed towards a children's hospital and a race track. The Illinois House impeached him for abuse of power and corruption. In two separate and unanimous votes of the Illinois Senate, he was removed from office and prohibited from ever holding public office in the state of Illinois again. See also: Rod Blagojevich corruption charges.
February 18, 2020	Judith Negron	Southern District of Florida	December 8, 2011	35 years' imprisonment (as amended); three years' supervised release; and $87,533,863.46 restitution	Conspiracy to commit health care fraud; health care fraud (two counts); conspiracy to defraud the United States and to receive and pay health care kickbacks; conspiracy to commit money laundering; money laundering (16 counts); structuring to avoid reporting requirements (three counts)	Negron, of Hialeah, Florida, age 49 at the time of the commutation, was convicted for her role in a major Medicare fraud scheme. The commutation released her from prison after serving eight years of her 35-year sentence and relieved her from her obligation to pay the remainder of $87 million in restitution.
February 18, 2020	Crystal Munoz	Western District of Texas	January 24, 2008	15 years, 8 months' imprisonment; 5 years' supervised release	Conspiracy to possess with intent to distribute 1,000 or more kilograms of marijuana	
February 18, 2020	Tynice Nichole Hall	Northern District of Texas	July 28, 2006	20 years, 8 months' imprisonment; 5 years' supervised release	Conspiracy to distribute, possess with intent to distribute, and manufacture more than 50 grams of a mixture and substance containing a detectable amount of cocaine base (crack cocaine) and aiding and abetting; possession with intent to distribute cocaine base and aiding and abetting; possession of cocaine with intent to manufacture cocaine base and aiding and abetting; receipt of firearms by a person under felony indictment and aiding and abetting; possession of firearms in furtherance of drug trafficking crimes and aiding and abetting	Hall, of Lubbock, Texas, was convicted on various drug charges and served almost 14 years before being granted clemency. The commutation of Hall's sentence was urged by Alice Marie Johnson.
July 10, 2020	Roger Stone	District of Columbia	February 20, 2020	40 months' imprisonment; 24 months' supervised release conditioned upon performance of 250 hours' community service; $20,000 fine	Making false statements to Congress (five counts); Witness tampering Obstructing an official proceeding	Stone is a friend and adviser of Trump, who was a member of Trump's 2016 presidential campaign. In November 2019, Stone was convicted by a jury on all seven charges that he faced, in relation to his actions during the investigation into Russian interference in the 2016 United States elections. The sentencing judge stated that Stone had been "prosecuted for covering up for the president"—Trump himself. In June 2020, around a month before the commutation, Trump had declared that Stone "can sleep well at night!" At the time of the commutation, Stone had been scheduled to report to federal prison around a week later.
October 21, 2020	Lenora Logan	Southern District of Iowa	December 30, 1999	324 months' imprisonment (amended); 10 years' supervised release	Conspiracy to distribute and possess with intent to distribute cocaine base ("crack")	Commutation urged by Alice Marie Johnson.
October 21, 2020	Rashella Reed	Southern District of Georgia	November 6, 2013	14 years' imprisonment; three years' supervised release; $8 million restitution	Wire fraud and money laundering	Commutation urged by Alice Marie Johnson.
October 21, 2020	Charles Tanner	Northern District of Indiana	May 26, 2009	30 years' imprisonment; ten years' supervised release; $1,000 fine	Conspiracy to possess cocaine, attempted possession of cocaine	Commutation urged by Alice Marie Johnson.
October 21, 2020	John Bolen	Southern District of Florida	March 5, 2007	Life imprisonment; five years' supervised release	Conspiracy to import, attempted importation of, and possession of cocaine	Commutation urged by Alice Marie Johnson.
October 21, 2020	Curtis McDonald	Western District of Tennessee	February 28, 1997	Life imprisonment; five years' supervised release	Conspiracy to possess cocaine, attempted possession of cocaine, money laundering	Commutation urged by Alice Marie Johnson: McDonald was a co-conspirator of Johnson's.
December 22, 2020	Steve Stockman	Southern District of Texas	November 7, 2018	10 years' imprisonment; $1,014,718.51 in restitution; three years of supervised release	Mail fraud, money laundering, violations of federal election law	Stockman, a former Republican congressman from Texas, had been convicted and sentenced to ten years in prison for misusing $1.25 million in donations from political donors by spending the money on personal expenses rather than charity, as he had pledged. The commutation released Stockman from prison after two years.
December 22, 2020	Crystal Munoz	Western District of Texas	January 24, 2008	15 years, 8 months' imprisonment; 5 years' supervised release	Conspiracy to possess with intent to distribute 1,000 or more kilograms of marijuana	Commutation of supervised release, after earlier commutation of prison sentence in February 2020.
December 22, 2020	Judith Negron	Southern District of Florida	December 8, 2011	35 years' imprisonment (as amended); three years' supervised release; and $87,533,863.46 restitution	Conspiracy to commit health care fraud; health care fraud (two counts); conspiracy to defraud the United States and to receive and pay health care kickbacks; conspiracy to commit money laundering; money laundering (16 counts); structuring to avoid reporting requirements (three counts)	Commutation of supervised release, after earlier commutation of prison sentence in February 2020.
December 22, 2020	Tynice Nichole Hall	Northern District of Texas	July 28, 2006	20 years, 8 months' imprisonment; 5 years' supervised release	Conspiracy to distribute, possess with intent to distribute, and manufacture more than 50 grams of a mixture and substance containing a detectable amount of cocaine base (crack cocaine) and aiding and abetting; possession with intent to distribute cocaine base and aiding and abetting; possession of cocaine with intent to manufacture cocaine base and aiding and abetting; receipt of firearms by a person under felony indictment and aiding and abetting; possession of firearms in furtherance of drug trafficking crimes and aiding and abetting	Commutation of supervised release, after earlier commutation of prison sentence in February 2020.
December 22, 2020	Philip Esformes	Southern District of Florida	September 12, 2019	240 months' imprisonment; three years supervised release; $5,530,207 restitution	Conspiracy to defraud the United States and pay and receive health care kickbacks; receipt of kickbacks in connection with a federal health care program (two counts); payment of kickbacks in connection with a federal health care program (four counts); conspiracy to commit money laundering; money laundering (six counts); conspiracy to commit federal program bribery; conspiracy to commit federal program bribery and honest services wire fraud; obstruction of justice	Esformes ran a network of nursing homes in Chicago that he used to perpetrate a massive Medicaid fraud scheme involving about $1.3 billion in fraudulent claims. Esformes used the proceeds of the scheme for luxury goods and private jet travel. The Aleph Institute, a group that was influential in Trump's clemencymaking, lobbied for his commutation; the organization received $65,000 from Esformes's family from 2016 to 2019, during Esformes' prosecution and imprisonment. Esformes was arrested on October 12, 2024, for domestic violence. He was released a couple of days later after posting $1,650 in bail.
December 23, 2020	Daniela Gozes-Wagner	Southern District of Texas	March 6, 2019	240 months' imprisonment; three years supervised release; $15,283,985 restitution	Conspiracy to commit health care fraud; conspiracy to commit money laundering	Gozes-Wagner took part in a health care fraud scheme. Her codefendants, who led the scheme, accepted a plea deal and were sentenced to between five and ten years in prison; Gozes-Wagner rejected a four-year plea offer and chose to go to trial. She was convicted and sentenced to 20 years. Gozes-Wagner's clemency request was supported by a group of former judges, federal prosecutors, law professors, and attorneys.
December 23, 2020	Mark Shapiro	Southern District of New York	October 25, 2010	85 years imprisonment	Substantive and conspiratorial counts of securities fraud, mail fraud and wire fraud	Shapiro and Stitsky defrauded $23 million from 250 investors.
December 23, 2020	Irving Stitsky	Southern District of New York	October 25, 2010	85 years imprisonment	Substantive and conspiratorial counts of securities fraud, mail fraud and wire fraud	Shapiro and Stitsky defrauded $23 million from 250 investors.
January 13, 2021	Fred Davis Clark Jr.	Southern District of Florida	February 22, 2016	480 months' imprisonment; five years' supervised release; $179,076,941.89 restitution	Bank fraud (three counts); false statement in connection with federally insured loan (three counts); obstruction of official proceeding	Clark, of Orlando, Florida, masterminded a $300 million Ponzi scheme targeting residents of Clearwater and other Florida cities as part of a vacation rental scam. He was sentenced to 40 years in prison in 2016. Trump's commutation immediately released Clark from prison, but left intact his five years of supervised released and obligation to pay $179 million in restitution. The Tampa Bay Times editorial board criticized Trump's commutation of Clark's sentence, describing it as an "outrageous injustice reeks of favoritism and privilege and confirms how easily a president can abuse clemency power."
January 13, 2021	Jon Michael Harder	District of Oregon	November 17, 2015	180 months' imprisonment; three years' supervised release (as amended by order of December 2, 2015)	Mail fraud; engaging in monetary transactions in property derived from specified unlawful activity	Harder, the founder and CEO of Sunwest Management (once the U.S. third-largest assisted living chain, operating more than 300 homes at its peak), was convicted of defrauding investors and money laundering after the company collapsed. He was sentenced to 12 years; Trump commuted the prison term.
January 13, 2021	Chris Young	Middle District of Tennessee	September 12, 2014	168 months' imprisonment (as amended); five years' supervised release	Conspiracy to distribute and possession with intent to distribute 500 grams or more of cocaine and 280 grams or more of crack cocaine; attempted possession of a detectable amount of cocaine with intent to distribute within 1,000 feet of a school; felon in possession of a firearm; possession of a firearm in furtherance of a drug trafficking crime	Young, of Clarksville, Tennessee, was initially sentenced to life imprisonment under a federal three-strikes law, for a third drug-related conviction (his prior two convictions were when he was 18 and 19 years old). After sentencing judge Kevin H. Sharp retired from the bench, he advocated clemency for Young.
January 13, 2021	William "Billy" T. Walters	Southern District of New York	July 27, 2017	60 months' imprisonment; one year of supervised release; $10,000,000 fine; $8,890,969.33 restitution	Conspiracy to commit securities fraud; conspiracy to commit wire fraud; securities fraud (four counts); wire fraud (four counts)	Walters, a wealthy sports gambler, was sentenced to five years in prison for his participation in an insider trading scheme.
January 13, 2021	Adrianne Davis Miller	Southern District of Alabama	April 23, 2015	180 months' imprisonment; 5 years' imprisonment (as amended September 2019)	Conspiracy to possess with intent to distribute methamphetamine; possession of a list I chemical with knowledge and reasonable cause to believe it would be used to manufacture a controlled substance	
January 13, 2021	Kwame M. Kilpatrick	Eastern District of Michigan	October 10, 2013	336 months' imprisonment; three years' supervised release; $4,799,826.61 restitution	Racketeering conspiracy; interference with commerce by extortion (five counts); bribery concerning programs receiving federal funds; mail fraud (10 counts); wire fraud (two counts); subscribing false tax return (six counts)	Kilpatrick, a Democrat who was mayor of Detroit from 2002 until his resignation in 2008, was tried and convicted on 24 corruption counts for using his office to enrich himself and associates, and was sentenced to 28 years. Kilpatrick denied responsibility, but all his appeals were rejected. Trump's commutation reduced his sentence to time served, releasing him from prison immediately (20 years early) rather than in 2037. Along with the sentence given to Jimmy Dimora, Kilpatrick's sentence was a record length for a public corruption scandal. U.S. Attorney Matthew J. Schneider strongly criticized Trump's grant of a commutation to Kilpatrick, calling him a "disgraced ... notorious and unrepentant criminal" who "earned every day he served in federal prison for the horrible crimes he committed against the people of Detroit." The current mayor of Detroit, Mike Duggan, supported Kilpatrick's commutation, calling him "a person of great talent who still has much to contribute." Governor Gretchen Whitmer said Kilpatrick's crimes were "reprehensible" but that his sentence was harsh. The commutation left intact Kilpatrick's obligation to pay $195,000 owed to the IRS and $1.5 million in restitution to the City of Detroit. Prior to receiving clemency, Kilpatrick had praised Trump, writing letters saying that his tenure had been an "unprecedented success." Kilpatrick's bid for clemency was supported by a number of Trump allies, including Diamond and Silk and Peter Karmanos Jr.
January 19, 2021	Michael H. Ashley	Eastern District of New York	July 18, 2019	36 months' imprisonment; five years' supervised release; $49,307,759.84 restitution	Bank fraud	Ashley was chief business strategist at Melville, New York-based Lend America, a large mortgage lender that imploded in 2009, resulting in $49 million in federally guaranteed loans (backed by Ginnie Mae) from being unfunded. U.S. Bankruptcy Judge Dorothy Eisenberg wrote in 2013 that Ashley "diverted over $50 million" of money from Lend America's parent company's "for his own benefit, and/or for the benefit of his affiliated entities or relatives"; Ashley pleaded guilty to bank fraud in 2011 and was sentenced in 2019. Trump's commutation eliminated Ashley's prison term (which he had been ordered to serve starting in March 2021). However, the commutation left intact the court's order to serve five years of supervised release, pay $49 million in restitution, and forfeit $800,000.
January 19, 2021	David Morris Barren	Eastern District of Maryland	August 11, 2010	360 months' imprisonment (as amended by executive clemency on January 19, 2017); five years' supervised release	Conspiracy to distribute over five kilograms of cocaine; conspiracy to structure financial transactions; concealment money laundering (31 counts); structuring (two counts); money laundering-avoid reporting requirements (six counts); money laundering over $10,000 (eight counts); promotion money laundering (two counts)	
January 19, 2021	Kristina Kay Bohnenkamp	Eastern District of Northern District of Iowa	January 5, 2011	262 months' imprisonment (as amended by order of March 24, 2015); 10 years' supervised release	Conspiracy to manufacture 50 grams or more of actual methamphetamine after having been convicted of a felony drug offense	
January 19, 2021	Jonathan Braun	Eastern District of New York	May 28, 2019	10 years' imprisonment; five years' supervised release; $100,000 fine	Conspiracy to import marijuana into the United States; money laundering	Braun, of Staten Island, served one year of a 10-year sentence for running a large-scale drug trafficking organization. Court records indicated that Braun had a history of violence and threats. After he was in 2009, he pleaded guilty, but, while on bail awaiting sentencing, he fled to Canada and then to Israel where court records indicate he continued to lead the drug ring. Braun was arrested after he returned to the United States in the fall of 2009. He was sentenced in 2019 and was not ordered to prison until January 2020. The commutation of his sentence was granted by Trump outside the usual DOJ process. In 2023, the New York Times reported that the commutation had come about at the urging of Charles Kushner, father of Trump's son-in-law Jared Kushner, and that it had ended a criminal investigation into predatory lending targeting small New York businesses. In the civil suit brought against Braun by the Federal Trade Commission and the New York State Attorney General for his involvement in a predatory loan operation that targeted and threatened small business owners, Braun was fined $20 million in February 2024. On August 20, 2024, Braun was charged for assaulting his wife on two occasions and punching his 75-year-old father-in law who was trying to protect his daughter on a third occasion. In 2025, prosecutors said Braun "had continued a pattern of violence, including sexually assaulting a nanny, swinging an IV pole at a nurse and threatening a congregant at his synagogue. He was also accused of assaulting a 3-year-old, and was continuing to make usurious loans to struggling small businesses" and "had “repeatedly evaded” a $4 toll while driving his Ferrari and Lamborghini".
January 19, 2021	Ann Marie Butler	District of South Carolina	July 22, 2010	360 months' imprisonment; 10 years' supervised release	Conspiracy to possess with intent to distribute and distribution of 5 kilograms or more of cocaine, 50 grams or more of cocaine base, and a quantity of 3,4- methylenedioxymethamphetamine	
January 19, 2021	Matthew Antione Canady	Southern District of Iowa	April 10, 2009	262 months' imprisonment (as amended by order of December 22, 2014); five years' supervised release	Conspiracy to distribute at least 50 grams of cocaine base	
January 19, 2021	Craig Cesal	District of Northern District of Georgia	September 26, 2003	360 months' imprisonment (as amended by order of August 22, 2016)	Conspiracy to possess with intent to distribute marijuana	
January 19, 2021	Jeff Cheney	Northern District of Iowa	February 21, 2008	216 months' imprisonment; 10 years' supervised release	Conspiracy to manufacture and distribute 500 grams or more of methamphetamine mixture following a felony drug conviction	
January 19, 2021	Mario Claiborne	Northern District of Illinois	May 23, 1994	Life imprisonment; five years' supervised release	Conspiracy to possess with intent to distribute cocaine; engaging in a continuing criminal enterprise; use of the telephone to facilitate felony drug distribution (six counts); possession with intent to distribute cocaine (six counts); distribution of cocaine (four counts); conducting financial transactions with money from drug transactions (two counts)	
January 19, 2021	Corvain T. Cooper	Western District of North Carolina	July 28, 2014	Life imprisonment; 10 years' supervised release	Conspiracy to possess with intent to distribute marijuana; conspiracy to commit money laundering; structuring currency transactions and aiding and abetting the same	Cooper, of Los Angeles, age 41 at the time of the commutation, was sentenced to life for conspiracy to distribute marijuana under a three-strikes law.
January 19, 2021	April D. Coots	Western District of Missouri	August 11, 2009	240 months' imprisonment; five years' supervised release	Conspiracy to manufacture and distribute methamphetamine	
January 19, 2021	James Brian Cruz	Western District of Texas	June 26, 2001	480 months' imprisonment; five years' supervised release; $25,000 fine	Conspiracy to possess with intent to distribute more than 500 grams of methamphetamine	
January 19, 2021	Marquis Dargon	Middle District of Florida	May 8, 2008	210 months' imprisonment; eight years' supervised release	Conspiracy to possess with intent to distribute and to distribute 500 grams or more of cocaine	
January 19, 2021	Jaime A. Davidson	Northern District of New York	July 1, 1993	Life imprisonment plus five years' imprisonment; five years' supervised release	Conspiracy to distribute cocaine; distribute cocaine (four counts); murder of DEA agent; murder of DEA agent in furtherance of drug conspiracy; use of firearm during drug trafficking crime	Davidson was a drug kingpin who was sentenced to life for ordering a robbery in 1990 that led to the murder of Wallie Howard, a Syracuse, New York police officer working as an undercover investigator. The commutation released Davison, age 52 at the time of the commutation, from prison after serving 29 years of a life sentence. Davidson never accepted responsibility for the crime and maintained for years that he was wrongfully convicted. Trump's commutation of Davidson's sentence was criticized by the region's congressman John Katko, Syracuse Police Chief Kenton Buckner, Onondaga County District Attorney William Fitzpatrick, and the federal prosecutor who handled the trial. In May 2023, he was sentenced to three months in prison for misdemeanor domestic battery.
January 19, 2021	John Estin Davis	Middle District of Tennessee	July 9, 2020	42 months' imprisonment; one year's supervised release; $20,000 fine (as amended)	Conspiracy to violate the anti-kickback statute and conspiracy to defraud the United States; receipt of kickbacks in connection with a federal healthcare program	
January 19, 2021	Anthony M. DeJohn	Northern District of New York	July 26, 2010	Life imprisonment; 10 years' supervised release	Conspiracy to possess with intent to distribute and distribution of marijuana; possession of firearms by a convicted felon	
January 19, 2021	Kenneth Charles Fragoso	Southern District of Texas	June 6, 1991	Life imprisonment; 10 years' supervised release	Conspiracy to possess with intent to distribute in excess of five kilograms of cocaine	Fragoso, age 66 at the time of the commitation, sold 10 kilograms (22 lb) of cocaine in 1990 to a DEA informant; he was sentenced to life imprisonment because it was his third offense.
January 19, 2021	Robert Francis	Eastern District of Missouri	October 3, 2002	Life imprisonment; five years' supervised release	Conspiracy to distribute and possession with intent to distribute cocaine	
January 19, 2021	Darrell Frazier	(1) Eastern District of Tennessee; (2) Northern District of Georgia	(1) January 22, 1990; (2) March 30, 2004	(1) Life imprisonment; (2) 18 months' imprisonment (consecutive); six years' supervised release	(1) Conspiracy to distribute and possess with intent to distribute cocaine hydrochloride; (2) Conspiracy to possess with intent to distribute heroin	
January 19, 2021	Rodney Nakia Gibson	District of South Carolina	July 28, 2009	211 months' imprisonment (as amended by orders of November 15, 2015 and January 9, 2017); five years' supervised release	Money laundering; conspiracy to possess with intent to distribute and to distribute 5 kilograms or more of cocaine and 50 grams or more of cocaine base; possession with intent to distribute 5 kilograms or more of cocaine; possession of a firearm during and in furtherance of a drug trafficking crime	
January 19, 2021	Jennings Gilbert	Eastern District of Kentucky	September 12, 2006	240 months' imprisonment; 10 years' supervised release	Conspiracy to manufacture over 1000 marijuana plants possession with intent to distribute marijuana	
January 19, 2021	Javier Gonzales	District of Montana	December 19, 2005	240 months' imprisonment; 10 years' supervised release	Conspiracy to possess with intent to distribute methamphetamine and distribution of methamphetamine; possession with intent to distribute methamphetamine and distribution of methamphetamine (two counts); use of a communication facility to facilitate the distribution of methamphetamine	
January 19, 2021	Luis Gonzalez	Eastern District of Texas	December 6, 1993	Life imprisonment; 10 years' supervised release	Possession with intent to distribute cocaine	
January 19, 2021	Michael Harris (Harry O)	Central District of California	November 26, 1990	235 months' imprisonment; five years' supervised release	Possession with intent to distribute less than 500 grams of cocaine hydrochloride; using/carrying a firearm during or in relation to a drug trafficking crime	Harris was a co-founder of the Death Row Records record label. Snoop Dogg had been one of the advocates of clemency for Harris. Subsequent to the commutation, Harris endorsed Donald Trump in the 2024 presidential election and was pardoned of his drug offenses in 2025.
January 19, 2021	Dwayne L. Harrison	Southern District of Mississippi	September 11, 2006	262 months' imprisonment; five years' supervised release	Possession with intent to distribute less than 500 grams of cocaine hydrochloride; using/carrying a firearm during or in relation to a drug trafficking crime	
January 19, 2021	Raymond Hersman	Southern District of West Virginia	December 31, 2013	240 months' imprisonment; 10 years' supervised release	Possession with intent to distribute 50 grams or more of methamphetamine	
January 19, 2021	Lou Hobbs	District of Columbia	August 4, 1997	Life imprisonment, five years' supervised release	Conspiracy to distribute and possess with intent to distribute 5 kilograms or more of cocaine and 50 grams or more of cocaine base; Unlawful possession with intent to distribute 500 grams or more of cocaine, attempted unlawful possession with intent to distribute 50 grams or more of cocaine base	
January 19, 2021	Reginald Dinez Johnson	Eastern District of Missouri	March 3, 2005	262 months' imprisonment (as amended by order of April 22, 2015); five years' supervised release	Conspiracy to distribute and possess with intent to distribute cocaine and PCP	
January 19, 2021	Bill K. Kapri (Kodak Black)	Southern District of Florida	November 13, 2019	46 months' imprisonment; three years' supervised release	Making a false statement in connection with the acquisition or attempted acquisition of a firearm (two counts)	
January 19, 2021	Cassandra Anne Kasowski	Southern District of North Dakota	March 20, 2014	186 months' imprisonment (as amended by order of September 19, 2018); five years' supervised release	Conspiracy to distribute and to possess with intent to distribute a controlled substance (methamphetamine)	
January 19, 2021	Traie Tavares Kelly	Southern District of South Carolina	January 7, 2009	240 months' imprisonment; 10 years' supervised release	Conspiracy to possess with intent to distribute and to distribute 50 grams or more of cocaine base and 5 kilograms or more of cocaine	
January 19, 2021	Kyle Kimoto	Southern District of Illinois	September 5, 2008	350 months' imprisonment; five years' supervised release; $34,915,321.30 restitution	Conspiracy; mail fraud in connection with telemarketing; wire fraud in connection with telemarketing (12 counts)	Kimoto had served 12 years of his 29-year sentence, convicted of leading a telemarketing scheme involving deceptive credit card offers. His commutation was recommended by Jewel and Ivanka Trump.
January 19, 2021	Sharon King	Southern District of New York	December 9, 2008	180 months' imprisonment (as amended by order of October 24, 2012); five years' supervised release	Conspiracy to distribute and possess with intent to distribute more than five kilograms of cocaine and a quantity of marijuana; distribution and possession with intent to distribute more than 500 grams of cocaine; distribution and possession with intent to distribute a quantity of marijuana; using and carrying a firearm during and in relation to a drug trafficking crime	
January 19, 2021	Noah Kleinman	Central District of California	December 8, 2014	211 months' imprisonment, five years' supervised release	Conspiracy to distribute and possess with intent to distribute marijuana (two counts); distribution of marijuana (two counts); maintaining a drug-involved premises; conspiracy to launder money	
January 19, 2021	John Richard Knock	Northern District of Florida	January 30, 2001	Life imprisonment; five years' supervised release; $1,411,476,800 fine	Conspiracy to possess with intent to distribute marijuana; conspiracy to import marijuana; conspiracy to launder monetary instruments	
January 19, 2021	Mary Anne Locke	Northern District of Iowa	June 30, 2009	234 months' imprisonment; 10 years' supervised release	Conspiracy to distribute 500 grams or more of methamphetamine (mixture) within 1,000 feet of a protected location; conspiracy to commit money laundering	
January 19, 2021	Tena M. Logan	Central District of Illinois	June 28, 2013	168 months' imprisonment (as amended by order of August 3, 2015); five years' supervised release	Conspiracy to manufacture, distribute, and possess with the intent to distribute 500 grams or more of methamphetamine; possession of 500 grams or more of methamphetamine with intent to distribute	
January 19, 2021	Way Quoe Long	Eastern District of California	March 16, 1998	600 months' imprisonment; 60 months' supervised release	Continuing criminal enterprise; conspiracy to manufacture, distribute and to possess with intent to distribute marijuana; manufacturing of marijuana and aiding and abetting (two counts); using and carrying a firearm during a drug trafficking offense; possession of a firearm silencer without a serial number; possession of a machine gun (two counts)	
January 19, 2021	Hector Madrigal Sr.	Southern District of Texas	July 20, 2007	20 years' imprisonment; 10 years' supervised release	Conspiracy to possess with intent to distribute a quantity in excess of 1,000 kilograms of marijuana	
January 19, 2021	Chalana C. McFarland	Northern District of Georgia	August 24, 2005	360 months' imprisonment; 5 years' supervised release; $11,417,352.44 restitution	Conspiracy to commit bank fraud, mail fraud, wire fraud, fraudulent use of Social Security numbers, fraudulent transfer of identification, fraud against the Department of Housing and Urban Development, money laundering, engagement in monetary transactions in property derived from specified unlawful activity, and obstruction of justice; bank fraud (30 counts); wire fraud (60 counts); money laundering (73 counts); obstruction of justice; perjury (4 counts)	McFarland, an Atlanta real estate closing attorney who was the ringleader of a mortgage fraud scheme that lasted from the late 1990s to early 2000s. The loans obtained by fraud totaled almost $20 million. She had been convicted of 169 counts in 2005. The commutation released her from prison after serving 15 years of a 30-year sentence; her request for clemency was supported by the CAN-DO Foundation.
January 19, 2021	Salomon E. Melgen	Southern District of Florida	February 22, 2018	204 months' imprisonment; three years' supervised release; $52,997,442 restitution (as amended April 5, 2018)	Health care fraud (36 counts); false, fictitious and fraudulent claims (19 counts); false statements relating to health care (11 counts)	Trump commuted the remainder of the prison sentence of Melgen, a prominent South Florida ophthalmologist who had been sentenced to 17 years for a $73 million scheme to defraud the government of Medicare payments from 2008 and 2013; Melgen's practice grew "by giving elderly patients unnecessary eye injections and laser blasts on their retinas that some compared to torture." Melgen's case was high-profile in part because of his association with Senator Bob Menendez (D-NJ); Menendez was tried (but not convicted) on charges of accepting gifts from Melgen.
January 19, 2021	Jawad Amir Musa	Southern District of New York	April 23, 1993	Life imprisonment, five years' supervised release	Conspiracy to possess with intent to distribute one kilogram or more of heroin	Musa was arrested in a 1990 DEA "reverse sting" operation in which Musa offered $20,000 for a heroin transaction. He received a mandatory life sentence in 1991; because Musa had two relevant prior convictions, the sentencing court had no discretion. Musa's clemency petition was supported by Kenneth Wainstein, who prosecuted the case, and John Gleeson, a retired federal judge who represented Musa. Current prosecutors assigned to the matter opposed Musa's request for executive clemency. Trump's commutation released Musa after 30 years in federal prison.
January 19, 2021	Sydney Melissa Navarro	Northern District of Texas	December 23, 2013	275 months' imprisonment (as amended by order of May 10, 2016); five years' supervised release	Conspiracy to possess with intent to distribute a controlled substance	
January 19, 2021	Issac Nelson	Southern District of South Carolina	June 10, 2010	240 months' imprisonment; 10 years' supervised release	Conspiracy to possess with intent to distribute and distribution of five kilograms or more of cocaine and 50 grams or more of crack cocaine	
January 19, 2021	Lerna Lea Paulson	District of North Dakota	September 4, 2014	204 months' imprisonment; five years' supervised release	Conspiracy to possess with intent to distribute and distribute a controlled substance	
January 19, 2021	Michael Pelletier	Northern District of Maine	January 22, 2008	Life imprisonment; 10 years' supervised release; $83,847.55 restitution	Conspiracy to import marijuana; conspiracy to possess with intent to distribute marijuana; money laundering (four counts); conspiracy to engage in money laundering; conspiracy to engage in money laundering structuring; social security fraud (two counts); conspiracy to engage in social security fraud	Pelletier of Saint David, Maine, age 64 at the time of the commutation, ran a cross-border marijuana smuggling operation in Maine from 2003 to 2006. He was granted clemency that released him from prison after serving 13 years of a life sentence, and had previously petitioned for compassionate release. Pelletier has been paralyzed from the waist down after a farming accident at age 11, and uses a wheelchair. His petition for clemency was supported by the CAN-DO Foundation.
January 19, 2021	Tara Michelle Perry	Northern District of Texas	February 18, 2014	195 months' imprisonment (as amended by order of July 5, 2016); four years' supervised release	Conspiracy to possess with intent to distribute a controlled substance	
January 19, 2021	Dwayne Phelps	Southern District of Indiana	November 5, 2009	240 months' imprisonment; 10 years' supervised release	Conspiracy to distribute 500 grams or more of methamphetamine (mixture); possession with intent to distribute 50 grams or more of methamphetamine (mixture)	
January 19, 2021	Jodi Lynn Richter	District of North Dakota	February 7, 2011	179 months' imprisonment (as amended by order of February 29, 2016); five years' supervised release	Conspiracy to possess with intent to distribute and distribute a controlled substance	
January 19, 2021	LaVonne Arlene Roach	District of South Dakota	March 2, 1998	30 years' imprisonment; five years' supervised release	Conspiracy to distribute controlled substance	Roach, of Rapid City, South Dakota, a member of the Cheyenne River Sioux Tribe, age 56 at the time of the commutation, served 23 years of her 30-year sentence for methamphetamine dealing. Prior to the commutation, she had been scheduled for release in July 2023 due to good-time credit. Governor Kristi Noem and the prosecutor in her case supported the commutation, which remitted the rest of her prison sentence but kept the five-year term of supervised release intact.
January 19, 2021	Mary Marcella Roberts	District of North Dakota	September 6, 2011	228 months' imprisonment; 10 years' supervised release	Conspiracy to possess with intent to distribute and distribute a controlled substance	
January 19, 2021	James R. Romans	Eastern District of Texas	February 22, 2013	360 months' imprisonment (as amended by order of July 24, 2017); five years' supervised release	Conspiracy to possess with the intent to distribute marijuana	
January 19, 2021	Ferrell Damon Scott	Southern District of Texas	April 2, 2009	Life imprisonment; 10 years' supervised release; $10,000 fine	Conspiracy to possess with intent to distribute in excess of 1,000 kilograms of marijuana; possession with intent to distribute in excess of 100 kilograms of marijuana (three counts)	
January 19, 2021	Adriana Shayota	Northern District of California	June 20, 2017	26 months' imprisonment; three years' supervised release; $144,868 fine	Conspiracy to traffic in counterfeit goods; conspiracy to commit criminal copyright infringement and conspiracy to introduce misbranded food into interstate commerce	
January 19, 2021	Luis Fernando Sicard	Southern District of Florida	September 29, 2000	353 months' imprisonment (as amended by order of December 10, 2015); five years' supervised release	Conspiracy to possess with intent to distribute cocaine; possession of a firearm during and in furtherance of a drug trafficking crime	
January 19, 2021	Brian Wayne Simmons	District of Oregon	May 28, 2013	180 months' imprisonment; five years' supervised release	Conspiracy to manufacture, distribute, and/or possess with intent to distribute 100 or more marijuana plants and/or 100 or more kilograms of marijuana; manufacture, distribute, and/or possess with intent to distribute 100 or more marijuana plants and/or 100 or more kilograms of marijuana (two counts)	
January 19, 2021	Derrick Bruce Smith	Western District of Missouri	August 23, 2002	340 months' imprisonment; five years' supervised release	Distribution of cocaine resulting in death; possession with intent to distribute cocaine	
January 19, 2021	Monstsho Eugene Vernon	District of South Carolina	July 23, 2001	482 months' imprisonment; five years' supervised release; $10,930 restitution	Attempted armed bank robbery; armed bank robbery (six counts); use and carry of a firearm in relation to a crime of violence (two counts)	Vernon was granted clemency after serving 19 years of a 40-year prison sentence for a string of bank robberies in Greenville County, South Carolina, in 2001.
January 19, 2021	Blanca Maribel Virgen	Northern District of Texas	August 14, 2009	360 months' imprisonment; five years' supervised release; $50,000 fine	Conspiracy to distribute methamphetamine; maintaining drug-involved premises	
January 19, 2021	Jerry Donnell Walden	Southern District of New York	November 16, 1998	480 months' imprisonment; five years' supervised release	Conspiracy to violate federal narcotics laws	
January 19, 2021	Eliyahu (Eli) Weinstein	District of New Jersey	(1) February 25, 2014; (2) December 15, 2014	(1) 264 months' imprisonment; three years' supervised release; $215,350,459 restitution; $215,350,459 forfeiture; (2) 135 months' imprisonment (all but 24 months concurrent); three years' supervised release; $6,176,750 restitution; $6,176,150 forfeiture	(1) Conspiracy to commit wire fraud; monetary transactions from specified lawful activity; (2) Conspiracy to commit wire fraud; committing wire fraud while on pretrial release; transacting in criminal proceeds	Weinstein, age 45 at the time of the commutation, was a con man and former used car salesman from Lakewood, New Jersey, pleaded guilty to running a $200 million Ponzi scheme involving phony real estate investments and—while awaiting trial on those charges—running a $6.7 million scam claiming special access to the Facebook, Inc. initial public offering. Sentenced to 24 years in prison, he was represented in his request for clemency by Alan Dershowitz, who was also Trump's personal lawyer. New Jersey Attorney General Gurbir Grewal, who as an Assistant U.S. Attorney prosecuted Weinstein, called Trump's grant of clemency "one huckster commuting the sentence of another." Weinstein hired Nick Muzin, a lobbyist and former aide to Republican Senators Ted Cruz and Tim Scott, to lobby Trump's chief of staff Mark Meadows for clemency. Weinstein's commutation had been supported by New Jersey Democrat-turned-Republican, Congressman Jeff Van Drew. On July 19, 2023, with four others who had helped him to hide his assets to avoid paying restitution, Weinstein was rearrested for conducting an estimated $35 million Ponzi scheme.
January 19, 2021	Sholam Weiss	Middle District of Florida	February 15, 2000	835 years' imprisonment (as amended by order of July 16, 2009); three years' supervised release; $123,399,910 fine; $125,016,656 restitution; and a January 9, 2009 order of $57,213,591.46 forfeiture (as amended on June 7, 2011, and May 5, 2012)	Racketeering; racketeering conspiracy (27 counts); interstate transportation of stolen property (23 counts); money laundering (29 counts); false statements (two counts)	Weiss, a former New York businessman, orchestrated a series of financial frauds that led to the collapse of the National Heritage Life Insurance Company. While out on bail, Weiss fled the country and became a fugitive for more than a year in Austria. He was sentenced to 835 years in 2000. Weiss's nephew advocated his commutation, and Weiss hired lobbyist Brett Tolman to persuade Trump to grant it. Prominent backers of Weiss's clemency bid included Edwin Meese, Seth Waxman, and Alan Dershowitz.
January 19, 2021	Tom Leroy Whitehurst	Eastern District of Missouri	October 10, 1996	Life imprisonment; five years' supervised release	Conspiring to manufacture in excess of 100 grams of methamphetamine; use of fire and explosive materials to destroy property used in interstate commerce and in activity affecting interstate commerce; destruction of property to prevent seizure; felon in possession of firearms (two counts); possession of ephedrine with intent to manufacture methamphetamine	
January 19, 2021	Caroline Yeats	Northern District of Texas	March 3, 2014	240 months' imprisonment; three years' supervised release	Conspiracy to possess with intent to distribute a controlled substance	

=== Miscellaneous ===
In 2019, former Navy SEAL Eddie Gallagher was demoted following a July 2, 2019, court martial based on accusations that he had committed a war crime. Trump later reversed his demotion.

== See also ==
- Article Two of the United States Constitution
- Federal pardons in the United States
- List of people granted executive clemency in the second Trump presidency
- List of people granted executive clemency by Barack Obama
- List of people pardoned by Bill Clinton
- List of people pardoned by George W. Bush
- List of people pardoned or granted clemency by the president of the United States
