= Amy Ralston Povah =

American prisoner advocate

Amy Ralston Povah is an American prisoner advocate and the founder of the CAN-DO Foundation.

== Arrest and clemency ==
Povah (then Amy Pofahl) served nine years of a 24-year sentence for conspiracy in an MDMA trafficking case. After several media pieces covering her sentence including a Glamour magazine story by David France, her sentence was commuted by President Bill Clinton on July 7, 2000.

Her sentence was commuted along with the sentences of Louise House, Shawndra Mills, and Serena Nunn; all of whom "..received much more severe sentences than their husbands and boyfriends" according to Clinton White House Press Secretary, Jake Siewert.

On January 20, 2021, she received a full pardon from Donald Trump.

== CAN-DO Foundation ==
Following her release from prison, Povah founded the CAN-DO foundation to advocate for the release of prisoners serving sentences for non-violent drug offences.

As of August 2020, she has helped more than 100 prisoners receive clemency from the federal government.

She is one of the founders of the National Council of Incarcerated and Formerly Incarcerated Women and Girls.

== Media ==
The 1998 book Shattered Lives: Portraits from America’s Drug War featured her.

Her story was featured in the 2016 documentary Incarcerating US.

She directed and produced the 2013 documentary film 420: The Documentary.
