= CAN-DO Foundation =

United States non-profit organization

The CAN-DO Foundation (Clemency for All Nonviolent Drug Offenders) is a 501(c)3 nonprofit foundation that fights for the release of nonviolent drug offenders from prison. The foundation educates the public about conspiracy law and advocates for law reform.

It was started by Amy Povah, herself released by presidential clemency in 2000 in the last year of Bill Clinton's Administration, having served 9 years of a 24-year sentence for conspiracy in a MDMA trafficking case.

== Cases ==
As of 2020, the foundation has helped over 100 prisoners receive clemency. Some of the notable cases have been:

- Charles "Duke" Tanner: Was given a life sentence for his first offense, a nonviolent drug trafficking charge.
- Richard "Dickie" Lynn: In 1989, Lynn received a life sentence for conspiring with others in trafficking marijuana and cocaine into Alabama.
- Michael “Meeko” Thompson: Sentenced to 42 to 62 years after being convicted of selling three pounds of marijuana to an undercover informant in December 1994.
- Crystal Munoz: Sentenced to 20 years in prison in 2007 for conspiring to distribute marijuana.
- Alice Marie Johnson: Sentenced to a life sentence without parole for conspiracy to possess cocaine.
- John Bolen: Sentenced to four life sentences for allowing drug smugglers to use his boat.
- Lavonne Roach: Sentenced to 30 years in prison for conspiracy to distribute methamphetamine.
