= List of people pardoned or granted clemency by the president of the United States =

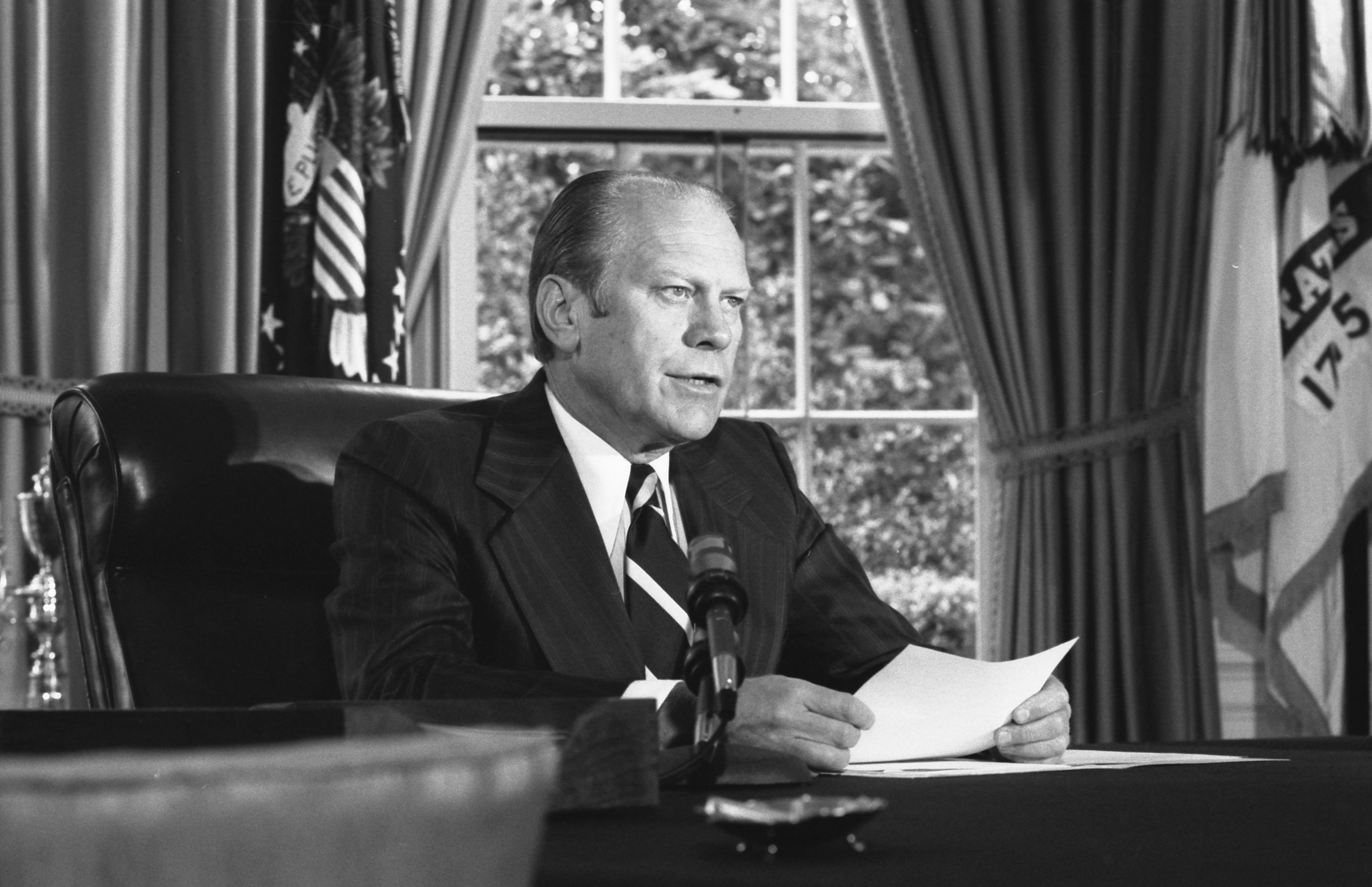
President Gerald Ford announcing his decision to pardon former president Richard Nixon, September 8, 1974, in an Oval Office address to the nation

This is a partial list of people pardoned or granted clemency by the president of the United States. The plenary power to grant a pardon or a reprieve is granted to the president by Article II, Section 2, Clause 1 of the Constitution; the only limits mentioned in the Constitution are that pardons are limited to federal offenses, and that they cannot affect an impeachment process: "The president shall ... have power to grant reprieves and pardons for offenses against the United States, except in cases of impeachment".

Though pardons have been challenged in the courts, and the power to grant them challenged by Congress, the courts have consistently declined to put limits on the president's discretion. The president can issue a full pardon, reversing a criminal conviction (along with its legal effects) as if it never happened. A pardon can also be offered for a period of time to cover any crimes that may have taken place or stop any charges from ever being filed during that period. A pardon can be issued from the time an offense is committed, and can even be issued after the full sentence has been served. The president can issue a reprieve, commuting a criminal sentence, lessening its severity, its duration, or both while leaving a record of the conviction in place. Additionally, the president can make a pardon conditional, or vacate a conviction while leaving parts of the sentence in place, like the payment of fines or restitution. After George W. Bush attempted to rescind his pardon of Isaac Robert Toussie, the Department of Justice concluded that the pardon was not yet effective, since it had never been officially delivered to Toussie. Under this legal interpretation, posthumous presidential pardons appear to be merely ceremonial and have no effect, since they were never delivered to the recipient.

Pardons granted by presidents from George Washington until Grover Cleveland's first term (1885–89) were handwritten by the president; thereafter, pardons were prepared for the president by administrative staff requiring only that the president sign it. The records of these presidential acts were openly available for public inspection until 1934. In 1981, the Office of the Pardon Attorney was created and records from President George H. W. Bush forward are listed.

== Summary ==
| President | Tenure | Pardons or clemency | Notes |
|---|---|---|---|
| George Washington | 1789–1797 | 16 | |
| John Adams | 1797–1801 | 20 | |
| Thomas Jefferson | 1801–1809 | 119 | |
| James Madison | 1809–1817 | 196 | |
| James Monroe | 1817–1825 | 414 | |
| John Quincy Adams | 1825–1829 | 183 | |
| Andrew Jackson | 1829–1837 | 386 | |
| Martin Van Buren | 1837–1841 | 168 | |
| William Henry Harrison | 1841 | 0 | |
| John Tyler | 1841–1845 | 209 | |
| James K. Polk | 1845–1849 | 268 | |
| Zachary Taylor | 1849–1850 | 38 | |
| Millard Fillmore | 1850–1853 | 170 | |
| Franklin Pierce | 1853–1857 | 142 | |
| James Buchanan | 1857–1861 | 150 | |
| Abraham Lincoln | 1861–1865 | 343 | |
| Andrew Johnson | 1865–1869 | 7,654 | Includes thousands of pardons for ex-Confederates |
| Ulysses S. Grant | 1869–1877 | 1,332 | |
| Rutherford B. Hayes | 1877–1881 | 893 | |
| James A. Garfield | 1881 | 0 | |
| Chester A. Arthur | 1881–1885 | 337 | |
| Grover Cleveland | 1885–1889, 1893–1897 | 1,107 | Estimate |
| Benjamin Harrison | 1889–1893 | 613 | |
| William McKinley | 1897–1901 | 918 | Estimate |
| Theodore Roosevelt | 1901–1909 | 981 | Estimate |
| William Howard Taft | 1909–1913 | 758 | |
| Woodrow Wilson | 1913–1921 | 2,480 | |
| Warren G. Harding | 1921–1923 | 800 | |
| Calvin Coolidge | 1923–1929 | 1,545 | |
| Herbert Hoover | 1929–1933 | 1,385 | |
| Franklin D. Roosevelt | 1933–1945 | 3,687 | |
| Harry S. Truman | 1945–1953 | 2,044 | |
| Dwight D. Eisenhower | 1953–1961 | 1,157 | |
| John F. Kennedy | 1961–1963 | 575 | |
| Lyndon B. Johnson | 1963–1969 | 1,187 | |
| Richard Nixon | 1969–1974 | 926 | |
| Gerald Ford | 1974–1977 | 409 | Pardoned Richard Nixon in September 1974 |
| Jimmy Carter | 1977–1981 | 200,000+ | Over 200,000 pardoned for Vietnam draft evasion, 566 others |
| Ronald Reagan | 1981–1989 | 406 | |
| George H. W. Bush | 1989–1993 | 77 | |
| Bill Clinton | 1993–2001 | 459 | |
| George W. Bush | 2001–2009 | 200 | |
| Barack Obama | 2009–2017 | 1,927 | |
| Donald Trump | 2017–2021, 2025–present | 1,700+ | Includes approximately 1,500 pardoned for January 6 Capitol attack. He was the first president to pardon corporations, pardoning 9 and wiping out $200 million in penalties. |
| Joe Biden | 2021–2025 | 4,244 | Includes 80 individual pardons and 4,165 clemencies for non-violent drug offenders |

== George Washington ==
President George Washington pardoned, commuted, or rescinded the convictions of 16 people. Among them are:

- Philip Vigol (or Wigle) and John Mitchel,convicted of treason for their roles in the Whiskey Rebellion
- Last day anmestias Benjamin Parkinson ,Daniel Hamilton,William Miller,Richard Holcroft,Ebenezer Gallagher,William Hannah (or Hanna),Peter Lisle ,David Lock,Alexander Fulton,Thomas Spiers.

== John Adams ==
Federalist president John Adams pardoned, commuted, or rescinded the convictions of 20 people. Among them are:

- David Bradford, for his role in the Whiskey Rebellion
- John Fries, for his role in Fries' Rebellion; convicted of treason due to opposition to a tax; Fries and others were pardoned, and a general amnesty was issued for everyone involved in 1800.

== Thomas Jefferson ==
Democratic-Republican president Thomas Jefferson pardoned, commuted, or rescinded the convictions of 119 people. One of his first acts upon taking office was to issue a general pardon for any person convicted under the Sedition Act. Among them are:

- David Brown – convicted of sedition under the Sedition Act of 1798 because of his criticism of the U.S. federal government, receiving the harshest sentence of anyone; pardoned along with all violators of the act
- Benjamin Fairbanks – convicted with Brown of erecting a Liberty Pole in Dedham, Massachusetts. He received the lightest sentence of anyone under the Act.

== James Madison ==
Democratic-Republican president James Madison pardoned, commuted, or rescinded the convictions of 196 people. Among them are:

- William Hull – while Governor of the Michigan Territory, sentenced to death for surrendering Fort Detroit during the War of 1812; pardoned due to his heroic conduct during the American Revolution
- Jean Lafitte and Pierre Lafitte and the Baratarian Pirates for past piracy, granted due to their assistance during the War of 1812; granted February 6, 1815

== James Monroe ==
Democratic-Republican president James Monroe pardoned, commuted, or rescinded the convictions of 419 people. Among them are:

- Numerous individuals convicted of piracy

== John Quincy Adams ==
Democratic-Republican president John Quincy Adams pardoned, commuted, or rescinded the convictions of 183 people. Among them are:

- Captain L. O. Helland – arrested for having more passengers on board the vessel (Restauration) than were allowed by American law; pardoned in 1825
- Wekau and Chickhonsic – Ho-Chunk leaders pardoned for their role in the Winnebago War

== Andrew Jackson ==
Democratic president Andrew Jackson pardoned, commuted, or rescinded the convictions of 386 people. Among them are:

- George Wilson – convicted of robbing the United States mails. Strangely, Wilson refused to accept the pardon. The case went before the Supreme Court, and in United States v. Wilson the court stated: "A pardon is a deed, to the validity of which delivery is essential, and delivery is not complete without acceptance. It may then be rejected by the person to whom it is tendered; and if it is rejected, we have discovered no power in this court to force it upon him." While Wilson refused the pardon, he avoided being hanged unlike his accomplice who was. A report in The National Gazette of Philadelphia dated January 14, 1841, suggests that he was in prison for ten years until released. He received another pardon from President Martin Van Buren, which he accepted. However, the Smithsonian magazine has written that Wilson was hanged as a result of refusing the pardon.
- Fontaine H. Pettis – Convicted of perjury, pardoned November 16, 1831

== Martin Van Buren ==
Democratic president Martin Van Buren pardoned, commuted, or rescinded the convictions of 168 people. Among them are:

- William Lyon Mackenzie – violation of American neutrality laws; pardoned

== William Henry Harrison ==
Whig president William Henry Harrison was one of only two presidents who issued no pardons, the other being James A. Garfield. This was due to Harrison's death shortly after taking office.

== John Tyler ==
Whig president John Tyler pardoned, commuted, or rescinded the convictions of 209 people. Among them are:

- Alexander William Holmes – sailor convicted of voluntary manslaughter (U.S. v. Holmes); pardoned

== James K. Polk ==
Democratic president James K. Polk pardoned, commuted, or rescinded the convictions of 268 people. Among them are:

- John C. Frémont – convicted by court-martial of mutiny in 1848. Frémont later became the 1856 Republican candidate for the U.S. presidency.
- Gideon Johnson Pillow – convicted by court-martial of insubordination in 1848. (Note: Although James K. Polk did not issue Gideon J. Pillow a formal presidential pardon, his intervention has been characterized as a pardon in all but name. By exercising his executive authority to remit the sentence imposed by Pillow's court-martial, Polk granted relief with a practical effect comparable to that of a presidential pardon.)

== Zachary Taylor ==
Whig president Zachary Taylor pardoned, commuted, or rescinded the convictions of 38 people.

== Millard Fillmore ==
Whig president Millard Fillmore pardoned, commuted, or rescinded the convictions of 170 people. Among them are:

- Daniel Drayton and Edward Sayres – convicted in the Pearl incident (transporting slaves to freedom) in 1848; pardoned

== Franklin Pierce ==
Democratic president Franklin Pierce pardoned, commuted, or rescinded the convictions of 142 people.

- Noah Hanson – free black man who was tried and convicted of assisting slaves to escape, convicted in 1851; pardoned in 1854; only known presidential pardon of a black person for Underground Railroad activities

== James Buchanan ==
Democratic president James Buchanan pardoned, commuted, or rescinded the convictions of 150 people. Among them are:

- Brigham Young – pardoned for role in the 1857 Utah War
- Daniel Vandersmith – former judge, pardoned for forgery

== Abraham Lincoln ==
Republican president Abraham Lincoln pardoned, commuted, or rescinded the convictions of 343 people. Among them are:

- 265 of 303 Dakota Indians who attacked white settlers in the Great Sioux Uprising of 1862
- Clement Vallandigham – Copperhead congressman from Ohio sentenced for disloyalty in 1863; sentence commuted and deported to the Confederacy
- Emilie Todd Helm – wife of Confederate general Benjamin Hardin Helm and half-sister of Mary Todd Lincoln
- Moses Robinette – President Joe Biden's great-great grandfather who was charged with attempted murder in 1864.
- Various men who enlisted in the army, but who were, among other circumstances, underage, bounty jumpers, or AWOL

== Andrew Johnson ==
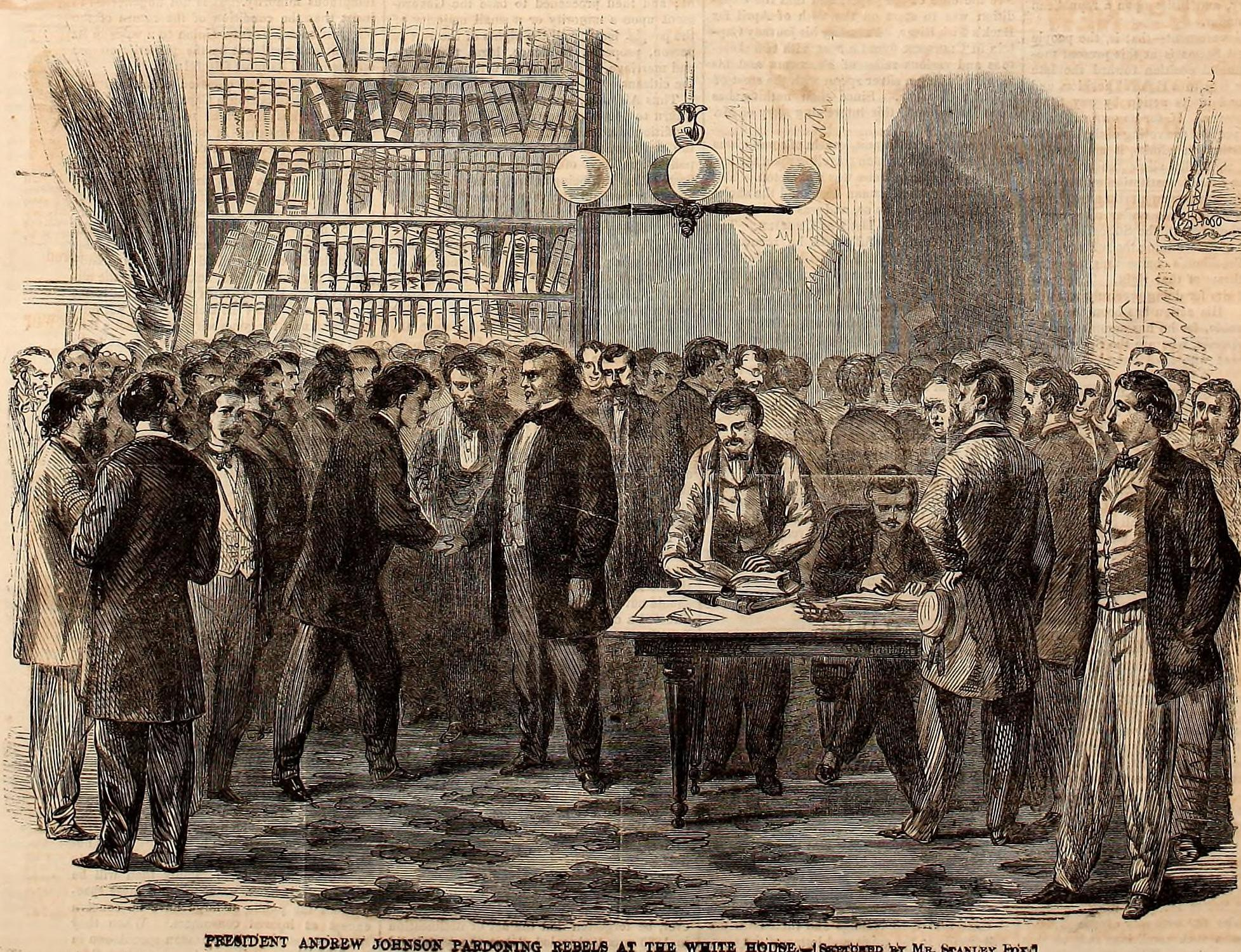
President Andrew Johnson pardoning rebels at the White House, sketched by Stanley Fox

Democratic president Andrew Johnson pardoned about 7,000 people in the "over $20,000" class (taxable property over $20,000) by May 4, 1866. More than 600 prominent North Carolinians were pardoned just before the election of 1864. Johnson pardoned, commuted, or rescinded the convictions of 654 people. Among them are:

- Ex-Confederates – On Christmas Day, 1868, Johnson issued a full and unconditional pardon and amnesty to all former Confederates of the rebellion (earlier amnesties requiring signed oaths and excluding certain classes of people were issued by both Lincoln and Johnson). Despite the pardon, they were constitutionally prohibitted from holding office by Section 3 of the 14th Amendment. Among them were:
  - Charles D. Anderson
  - Richard H. Anderson
  - Eli Metcalfe Bruce
  - Horatio Washington Bruce
  - Charles Clark
  - Jefferson Davis
  - Harris Flanagin
  - Augustus H. Garland
  - Benjamin Harvey Hill
  - Wade Keyes
  - Enoch Louis Lowe
  - Andrew Gordon Magrath
  - E. A. Nisbet
  - James Byeram Owens
  - Walter Preston
  - James Seddon
  - Alexander H. Stephens
  - George Trenholm
- Samuel Arnold – charged with conspiring to murder Lincoln
- Samuel Mudd – charged with conspiring to murder Lincoln
- Edmund Spangler – charged with conspiring to murder Lincoln

== Ulysses S. Grant ==
Republican president Ulysses S. Grant pardoned, commuted, or rescinded the convictions of 1,332 people. Among them are:

- Ex-Confederate leaders – all but 500 former top Confederate leaders were pardoned when Grant signed the Amnesty Act of 1872

== Rutherford B. Hayes ==
Republican president Rutherford B. Hayes pardoned, commuted, or rescinded the convictions of 893 people. Among them is:

- Ezra Heywood – anarchist convicted of violating the 1873 Comstock Act; pardoned after 6 months

== James A. Garfield ==
Republican president James A. Garfield was one of only two presidents who issued no pardons, the other being William Henry Harrison. This is because Garfield only served a few months before being assassinated.

== Chester A. Arthur ==
Republican president Chester A. Arthur pardoned, commuted, or rescinded the convictions of 337 people. Among them is:

- Fitz John Porter – former Army officer court-martialed in 1863 for his actions at the Second Battle of Bull Run; sentence commuted in 1886

== Grover Cleveland ==
Democratic president Grover Cleveland pardoned, commuted, or rescinded the convictions of 1,107 (est.) people during his two, non-consecutive terms. Among them are:

- James Brooks – Texas Ranger indicted for manslaughter in 1883; pardoned in 1886 after lobbying from his fellow Rangers
- Rudger Clawson – Latter-Day Saint convicted of polygamy in 1882; pardoned in 1887
- David King Udall – convicted on perjury charges; spent 3 months in prison; full and unconditional pardon in 1885
- "Billy Wilson" (David L. Anderson) – outlaw and associate of Billy the Kid; pardoned in 1896

== Benjamin Harrison ==
Republican president Benjamin Harrison pardoned, commuted, or rescinded the convictions of 613 people. Among them are:

- Members of the Church of Jesus Christ of Latter-day Saints – granted amnesty and pardon for the offense of engaging in polygamous or plural marriage to members of The Church of Jesus Christ of Latter-day Saints on January 4, 1893

== William McKinley ==
Republican president William McKinley pardoned, commuted, or rescinded the convictions of 918 (est.) people. Among them are:

- Alexander McKenzie – North Dakota political activist convicted of contempt of court in 1901; pardoned after spending three months in prison
- Charles Chilton Moore – atheist newspaper publisher jailed for sending obscene material in the mail in 1899; sentence commuted after six months in prison

== Theodore Roosevelt ==
Republican president Theodore Roosevelt pardoned, commuted, or rescinded the convictions of 981 (est.) people. Among them are:

- Servillano Aquino – Filipino general who received a death sentence in 1902 for anti-American activities in the Philippines; pardoned after 2 years
- Al Jennings – former train robber sentenced to life in prison for robbery in 1899; freed on technicality three years later; pardoned in 1904
- Stephen A. Douglas Puter – convicted of land fraud in 1906; pardoned after 18 months so he could turn in state's evidence

== William Howard Taft ==
Republican president William Howard Taft pardoned, commuted, or rescinded the convictions of 758 people. Among them are:

- John Hicklin Hall – attorney and politician convicted in 1908 for his role in the Oregon land fraud scandal; pardoned
- Charles W. Morse – ice shipping magnate convicted in 1909 of violations of federal banking laws; pardoned in 1912 due to ill health (later found to be feigned)
- William Van Schaick – steamboat captain convicted for criminal negligence for the General Slocum steamship disaster of 1904; pardoned after 3 1/2 years in prison

== Woodrow Wilson ==
Democratic president Woodrow Wilson pardoned, commuted, or rescinded the convictions of 2,480 people. Among them are:

- George Burdick – New York newspaper editor, who had refused to testify in federal court regarding the sources used in his article concerning the collection of customs duties. He pleaded the 5th Amendment; Wilson then granted him a full pardon for all of his federal offenses, which he refused. He continued to plead the 5th, at which he was sentenced by a federal judge for contempt. It was then that the Supreme Court (in Burdick v. United States) reinforced the necessity of accepting a pardon to be valid; the federal judge had imprisoned Burdick on the grounds that he was claiming falsely his need for protection against self-incrimination.
- Frederick Krafft – Socialist political candidate convicted for alleged violation of the Espionage Act in June 1918; pardoned after serving nine months; only person convicted under this law to receive a full executive pardon
- Mike Boyle – convicted before Judge Kenesaw Mountain Landis for violating the Sherman Antitrust Act and sentenced to one year's imprisonment; served four months and was pardoned
- Ben Reeves – son of Deputy United States Marshal Bass Reeves; convicted of murder on January 24, 1903, he was sentenced to life in prison; sentence commuted on November 10, 1914

== Warren G. Harding ==
Republican president Warren G. Harding pardoned, commuted, or rescinded the convictions of 800 people. Among them are:

- Eugene V. Debs – socialist convicted of sedition under the Espionage Act of 1917; sentence commuted in 1921
- Kate Richards O'Hare – convicted of sedition under the Espionage Act of 1917; sentence commuted in 1921

== Calvin Coolidge ==
Republican president Calvin Coolidge pardoned, commuted, or rescinded the convictions of 1,545 people. Among them are:

- Marcus Garvey – Jamaican immigrant and founder of Universal Negro Improvement Association UNIA; convicted of mail fraud in 1923; sentence commuted and deported in 1927
- Lothar Witzke – German spy and saboteur convicted in 1918; pardoned and deported in 1923

== Herbert Hoover ==
Republican president Herbert Hoover pardoned, commuted, or rescinded the convictions of 1,385 people. Among them are:

- Warren T. McCray – Governor of Indiana; convicted of mail fraud in 1924, paroled in 1927; pardoned in 1930 after learning of the Ku Klux Klan's role in his arrest and conviction
- Thomas W. Miller – former congressman and World War I veteran; convicted of conspiring to defraud the U.S. government in 1927; pardoned in 1933

== Franklin D. Roosevelt ==
Democratic president Franklin D. Roosevelt granted 3,687 pardons in his almost 4 terms in office. Among them are:

- George R. Dale – newspaper editor convicted of violating Prohibition laws in 1932; pardoned in 1933 after the repeal of Prohibition
- Roy Olmstead – bootlegger convicted for violating the National Prohibition Act in 1926; released in 1931; appealed, arguing that the wiretapping evidence used against him constituted a violation of his constitutional rights to privacy and against self-incrimination; the Supreme Court upheld the conviction in the landmark case of Olmstead v. United States; pardoned on Christmas Day of 1935
- Duncan Renaldo – Romanian-born actor arrested for illegal entry into the U.S. in 1933; pardoned

== Harry S. Truman ==
Democratic president Harry S. Truman pardoned, commuted, or rescinded the convictions of 2,044 people. Among them are:

- George Caldwell – Louisiana building contractor convicted in 1940 of income tax evasion and bribery for requiring kickbacks from contractors, paroled the following year; pardoned
- Oscar Collazo – A Puerto Rican nationalist, Collazo attempted to assassinate Truman in 1950. Truman commuted the death sentence to life sentence. See also listing under Jimmy Carter
- James Michael Curley – Mayor of Boston, Massachusetts; convicted of fraud and mail fraud in 1947; sentence commuted in 1950
- Richard W. Leche – former governor of Louisiana; convicted of mail fraud in 1940; pardoned in 1947
- Andrew J. May – former congressman convicted of accepting bribes in 1947; pardoned in 1952
- Seymour Weiss – hotel executive and Democratic Party campaign financier; convicted of tax evasion and mail fraud in 1940, released in 1942; pardoned in 1947
- 1,523 people convicted of violating the Selective Training and Service Act of 1940; full pardon

== Dwight D. Eisenhower ==
Republican president Dwight D. Eisenhower pardoned, commuted, or rescinded the convictions of 1,157 people. Among them is:

- Maurice L. Schick – military court-martial for murder in 1954; death sentence commuted to life imprisonment in 1960, with the condition that he would never be released. Legal challenge went to the Supreme Court, questioning the constitutionality of the punishment "life imprisonment without parole". Decided in Schick v. Reed that to be so sentenced was constitutional

"Until the Eisenhower Administration, each pardon grant was evidenced by its own separate warrant signed by the president. President Eisenhower began the practice of granting pardons by the batch, through the device of a 'master warrant' listing all of the names of those pardoned, which also delegated to the Attorney General (or, later, the Deputy Attorney General or Pardon Attorney) authority to sign individual warrants evidencing the president's action."

== John F. Kennedy ==
Democratic president John F. Kennedy pardoned, commuted, or rescinded the convictions of 575 people. Among them are:

- First-time offenders convicted of crimes under the Narcotics Control Act of 1956 – pardoned all, in effect overturning much of the law passed by Congress
- Hank Greenspun – editor and publisher of the Las Vegas Sun; convicted in 1950 of violating the Neutrality Act in shipping arms to Israel during the 1948 Arab–Israeli War; was fined but received no prison time; received a full pardon in 1961
- John Factor – reputed organized crime member; convicted of mail fraud in 1939; released in 1949 and scheduled to be deported; pardoned in 1962 after investigation by Robert F. Kennedy
- Hampton Hawes – musician convicted of heroin charges in 1958; Executive Clemency in 1963

== Lyndon B. Johnson ==
Democratic president Lyndon B. Johnson pardoned, commuted, or rescinded the convictions of 1,187 people. Among them are:

- Frank W. Boykin – Former Alabama congressman convicted of bribery in 1963; pardoned in 1965 at the request of departing attorney general Robert F. Kennedy
- Maurice Hutcheson – former president of the United Brotherhood of Carpenters and Joiners of America; held in Contempt of Congress in 1957; pardoned

== Richard Nixon ==
Republican president Richard Nixon pardoned, commuted, or rescinded the convictions of 926 people. Among them are:

- Jimmy Hoffa – prominent labor union leader convicted of fraud and bribery (tax evasion) in 1964; sentence commuted (with conditions) on December 23, 1971
- Angelo DeCarlo – convicted of conspiracy to commit murder and extortion in March 1970; was pardoned in late 1972 due to poor health and died on October 20, 1973

== Gerald Ford ==
Republican president Gerald Ford pardoned, commuted, or rescinded the convictions of 409 people. Among them are:

- Richard Nixon – granted a full and unconditional pardon in 1974 just before he could be indicted in the Watergate scandal. This was the only time that a U.S. president received a pardon.
- Ernest C. Brace – pardoned of his 1961 court-martial from the United States Marine Corps in light of his almost eight years as a POW in Vietnam.
- Iva Toguri D'Aquino, aka – "Tokyo Rose" – convicted of treason in 1949, paroled in 1956. She was pardoned on January 19, 1977, Ford's last day in office; the only U.S. citizen convicted of treason during World War II to be pardoned
- Vietnam war draft resisters – Ford offered conditional amnesty to over 50,000 draft resisters.
- Maurice L. Schick – military court-martial for murder; commuted to life with the possibility of parole

== Jimmy Carter ==
Democratic president Jimmy Carter pardoned, commuted, or rescinded the convictions of 566 people, and in addition to that pardoned over 200,000 Vietnam War draft evaders. Among them are:

- Oscar Collazo – attempted assassination of President Harry S. Truman in 1950; commuted to time served in 1979
- G. Gordon Liddy – Watergate figure; convicted for 20 years for conspiracy, burglary, and illegal wiretapping; commuted after serving 4 1/2 years in 1977
- Peter Yarrow – singer-songwriter of Peter, Paul and Mary; pleaded guilty to a sexual offense against a 14-year-old girl in 1970 and served three months in prison; pardoned in 1981
- Proclamation 4483 pardoning Vietnam war draft resisters – unconditional amnesty issued in the form of a pardon in 1977
- Patty Hearst – convicted of bank robbery in 1976 after being kidnapped and allegedly brainwashed; sentence commuted in 1979
- Lolita Lebrón, Rafael Cancel Miranda, and Irving Flores Rodriguez – opened fire in the U.S. House of Representatives and wounding five Congressmen in 1954; clemency
- Frederic B. Ingram – heir from Tennessee, convicted of bribing government officials in Illinois in 1977; jailed for 16 months. His sentence was commuted by Carter in December 1980.
- Huey P. Meaux – record producer and businessman from Texas, convicted of violating the Mann Act in 1967; pardoned in 1977.

== Ronald Reagan ==
Republican president Ronald Reagan pardoned, commuted, or rescinded the convictions of 406 people. Among them are:

- Mark Felt and Edward S. Miller – FBI officials convicted in December 1980 of authorizing illegal break-ins and fined; pardoned on March 20, 1981. Felt later in life admitted to being Deep Throat, the informant during the Watergate affair.
- Marvin Mandel – former governor of Maryland convicted of mail fraud and racketeering in 1977; granted clemency in 1981; conviction later overturned in a U.S. district court
- Junior Johnson – former NASCAR driver convicted of moonshining in 1956; pardoned in 1986
- George Steinbrenner – convicted of illegal Nixon campaign contributions and obstruction of justice in 1974; pardoned in January 1989

== George H. W. Bush ==
Republican president George H. W. Bush pardoned, commuted, or rescinded the convictions of 77 people. Among them are:

- For their roles in the Iran–Contra affair
  - Elliott Abrams
  - Duane Clarridge
  - Clair George
  - Alan Fiers
  - Robert McFarlane – National Security Adviser to President Ronald Reagan
  - Caspar Weinberger – Secretary of Defense under President Ronald Reagan
- Armand Hammer – CEO of the Occidental Petroleum Company, contributed $110,000 to the Republican National Committee just before his pardon. Pardoned for illegally contributing $54,000 to Richard Nixon's presidential campaign in 1972.
- Myra Soble – 1957 conviction of Conspiracy to Receive and Obtain National Defense Information and transmit same to foreign government in the Rosenberg spy ring; served four years, pardoned in 1991, and died one year later

== Bill Clinton ==
Democratic president Bill Clinton pardoned, commuted, or rescinded the convictions of 459 people. Among them are:

- Almon Glenn Braswell – nutritional supplement magnate, convicted of mail fraud and perjury in 1983; pardoned
- Henry Cisneros – Clinton's secretary of housing and urban development. Pleaded guilty to a misdemeanor count for lying to the FBI in 1999 about payments to a mistress and was fined $10,000
- Roger Clinton, Jr. – half-brother of Bill Clinton; pardoned after serving a year in federal prison (1985–86) for cocaine possession
- John Deutch – Director of Central Intelligence, former Provost and University Professor, MIT. He had agreed to plead guilty to a misdemeanor for mishandling government secrets on January 19, 2001, but Clinton pardoned him in his last day in office, two days before the Justice Department could file the case against him.
- Edward Downe, Jr. – convicted of wire fraud, filing false income tax returns, and securities fraud in 1992; pardoned
- Elizam Escobar – Puerto Rican artist and activist, convicted of seditious conspiracy in 1980; pardoned
- FALN – commuted the sentences of 16 members of FALN, a Puerto Rican clandestine paramilitary organization operating mostly in Chicago and New York City
- Henry O. Flipper – first black West Point cadet who was found guilty of "conduct unbecoming an officer" in 1882; posthumously pardoned
- Patty Hearst – convicted of bank robbery in 1976 after being kidnapped and allegedly brainwashed. Prison term commuted by Jimmy Carter and released from prison in 1979; fully pardoned by Clinton in 2001
- Rick Hendrick – NASCAR team owner & champion; convicted of mail fraud in 1997; pardoned
- Susan McDougal – business partner with Bill Clinton and Hillary Rodham Clinton in the failed Whitewater land deal. Guilty of contempt of court, she served her entire sentence starting in 1998 and was then pardoned.
- Samuel Loring Morison – former naval intelligence officer convicted of espionage and theft of government property in 1985; pardoned
- Mel Reynolds – former Democratic member of the United States House of Representatives from Illinois. Convicted of bank fraud and obstruction of justice in 1997; sentence commuted
- Marc Rich, Pincus Green – business partners; indicted by U.S. Attorney on charges of tax evasion and illegal trading with Iran in 1983 and fled the country that year; pardoned in 2001 after Rich's ex-wife, Denise Eisenberg Rich, made large donations to the Democratic Party and the Clinton Foundation
- Dan Rostenkowski – former Democratic member of the U.S. House of Representatives from Illinois, indicted for his role in the Congressional Post Office scandal and pleaded guilty to mail fraud in 1996; served his entire 17-month sentence, then pardoned in December 2000
- Fife Symington III – Governor of Arizona convicted of bank fraud in 1997; conviction overturned in 1999; subsequently pardoned
- Susan Rosenberg – former radical activist and domestic terrorist of the early 1970s, convicted of illegal explosives possession in 1984; commuted on January 20, 2001

== George W. Bush ==
Republican president George W. Bush pardoned, commuted, or rescinded the convictions of 200 people. Among them were:

- José Compeán and Ignacio Ramos – two U.S. Border Patrol agents who wounded drug smuggler Osvaldo Aldrete Dávila on February 17, 2005 and tried to cover up the incident; received commutation in 2009; later received a full pardon from President Donald Trump in 2020
- John Forté – hip-hop singer and songwriter sentenced for smuggling cocaine in 2000; commuted
- Lewis "Scooter" Libby – assistant to Bush and chief of staff to Dick Cheney; convicted of perjury in connection with the CIA leak scandal involving members of the State Department who "outed" CIA officer Valerie Plame; sentenced to 30 months in prison and fined $250,000 on June 5, 2007; received commutation of his prison sentence, not a full pardon, on July 2, 2007; later received a full pardon from President Donald Trump in 2018
- Issac Robert Toussie – Brooklyn real estate developer, convicted of making false statements to the U.S. Department of Housing and Urban Development in 2001; pardoned in 2008 and pardon revoked one day later
- Charles Winters – posthumous pardon for smuggling three B-17 Flying Fortress heavy bombers to Israel in the late 1940s; served 18 months in prison; died in 1984. The effectiveness of this pardon is questionable since a subsequent legal opinion about Issac Robert Toussie indicates that a pardon must be delivered to the recipient in order for it to have effect.

== Barack Obama ==
Democratic president Barack Obama pardoned, commuted, or rescinded the convictions of 1,927 people. Among them were:

- James Cartwright – retired U.S. Marine Corps four-star general; pleaded guilty to giving false statements to federal investigators in 2016 and was awaiting sentencing; pardoned on January 17, 2017
- Dwight J. Loving – U.S. Army private sentenced to death in Texas for murdering two taxi drivers in 1988; commuted to life without parole on January 17, 2017
- Chelsea Manning – U.S. Army whistleblower convicted by court-martial in July 2013; sentenced to 35 years in prison for providing classified documents to WikiLeaks; commuted on January 17, 2017
- Willie McCovey – professional baseball player; pleaded guilty to tax evasion in 1995 and received two years probation and a $5,000 fine; pardoned on January 17, 2017
- Ian Schrager – former co-owner of the famed dance club Studio 54; pleaded guilty to tax evasion in 1979 and received three and a half years in prison and a $20,000 fine; pardoned on January 17, 2017.
- Oscar López Rivera – FALN member sentenced in 1981 to 55 years in prison for seditious conspiracy, use of force to commit robbery, interstate transportation of firearms, and conspiracy to transport explosives with intent to destroy government property, and subsequently to an additional 15 years for attempted escape in 1988; commuted on January 17, 2017

== Donald Trump ==
=== First term ===
Republican president Donald Trump pardoned, commuted, or rescinded the convictions of 237 people in his first presidency.

- Joe Arpaio – former sheriff of Maricopa County, Arizona; convicted of contempt of court for refusing to end the practice of "immigrant round ups," and was awaiting sentencing; pardoned on August 25, 2017
- Sholom Rubashkin – Iowa meatpacking magnate sentenced to 27 years in prison for bank fraud in 2010; commuted on December 20, 2017
- Kristian Saucier – former U.S. Navy sailor who pleaded guilty to unauthorized possession and retention of national defense information in 2016; released the following year; pardoned on March 9, 2018
- Lewis "Scooter" Libby – former chief of staff to the vice president of the United States; convicted of perjury and obstruction of justice in connection with the CIA leak scandal. The sentence was already commuted to time served by President George W. Bush in July 2007, shortly after Libby's conviction; pardoned on April 13, 2018
- Jack Johnson – champion boxer who was convicted in 1913 while traveling with his white girlfriend for violating the Mann Act, which made it illegal to transport women across state lines for "immoral" purposes; released after one year; posthumously pardoned on May 24, 2018
- Dinesh D'Souza – author and documentary filmmaker; convicted of campaign finance violations in 2014; pardoned on May 31, 2018
- Alice Johnson – unemployed parcel delivery worker and first-time drug offender; sentenced to life without parole in 1996 for conspiracy to possess cocaine, attempted possession of cocaine, and money laundering; commuted on June 6, 2018
- Dwight Hammond and Steven Hammond – father and son Oregon ranchers convicted in 2012 of two counts of arson on federal land; commuted and pardoned on July 10, 2018
- Michael Behenna – former U.S. Army first lieutenant who was convicted in 2009 of murdering an unarmed prisoner during the Iraq War; sentenced to 25 years in military prison; paroled in 2014; pardoned on May 7, 2019
- Conrad Black – British newspaper publisher convicted in 2007 of fraud and obstruction of justice for scheming to siphon off millions of dollars from the sale of newspapers; spent 3 1/2 years in prison and deported; pardoned on May 15, 2019.
- Pat Nolan – former California state legislator who pleaded guilty to racketeering in 1994; served 2 years and 2 months in prison; pardoned on May 16, 2019
- Zay Jeffries – mining engineer and former vice president of General Electric; convicted in 1948 of violating the Sherman Antitrust Act and fined; died in 1965; posthumously pardoned on October 10, 2019
- Mathew L. Golsteyn – U.S. Army officer who served in the War in Afghanistan; accused of murder after the 2010 killing of an unarmed Afghan bomb maker who was a prisoner of war and the U.S. Army had opened an investigation of him in 2016; pardoned on November 15, 2019
- Clint Lorance – former first lieutenant with the 4th Brigade Combat Team, 82nd Airborne Division in the U.S. Army and veteran of the War in Afghanistan; convicted on two counts of second-degree murder for ordering soldiers in his platoon to open fire at three men sitting on a motorcycle in southern Afghanistan in July 2012 while his platoon was on combat patrol. During the trial all platoon members testified that the men were sitting, unmoving on a motorcycle while the defendant claimed the motorcycle was approaching at a high speed; sentenced to 19 years in prison in August 2013 and sent to Fort Leavenworth; pardoned on November 15, 2019
- Rod Blagojevich – former governor of Illinois; charged with attempting to sell an appointment to the U.S. Senate to succeed President-elect Barack Obama; convicted of soliciting bribes, extortion, and wire fraud on June 27, 2011 and sentenced to 14 years in prison; commuted to time served on February 18, 2020. Trump later issued an unconditional pardon to Blagojevich in February 2025.
- Bernard Kerik – former New York City police commissioner; pleaded guilty to tax fraud and perjury in 2010 for concealing apartment renovations paid for by a contractor that the city had blacklisted because of suspected ties to organized crime; sentenced to four years in prison in 2010; released in May 2013; pardoned on February 18, 2020
- Roger Stone – longtime political operative and friend of Trump; convicted in November 2019 on charges of witness tampering, obstructing an official proceeding, and five counts of making false statements in the course of inhibiting the investigation of the Trump campaign by Robert Mueller; sentenced to 40 months in prison, but on July 10, 2020, Trump commuted the sentence before Stone reported to prison; Trump pardoned Stone on December 23, 2020.
- Susan B. Anthony – suffragist and long-time proponent and organizer for women's suffrage in the United States; convicted of voting in the 1872 election; posthumously pardoned on August 18, 2020, the 100th anniversary of the ratification of the Nineteenth Amendment to the United States Constitution which gave American women the right to vote. The president of the National Susan B. Anthony Museum and House wrote that accepting the offer of a pardon would wrongly validate the trial proceedings in the same manner that paying the original fine would have, noting Anthony's former outrage and refusal.
- Michael Flynn – retired U.S. Army lieutenant general and the 25th National Security Advisor; withdrew his original guilty plea for making false statements to the FBI and federal district judge Emmet G. Sullivan had ruled the matter to be placed on hold; pardoned on November 25, 2020
- Alex van der Zwaan – New York–based Dutch lawyer; convicted on a guilty plea in February 2018 of making false statements to law enforcement officers in the investigation of the Russian interference in the 2016 election; served 30-day jail sentence, fined $20,000, and deported after release from jail; pardoned on December 23, 2020
- Kodak Black – American rapper; confessed to lying on background checks associated with purchasing firearms during two separate instances in 2019; commuted on January 20, 2021, after already having served "nearly half" of his 46-month sentence

=== Second term ===
Trump began pardoning, commuting, or rescinding convictions upon the first day of his second presidency:

- On January 20, 2025, Trump issued roughly 1,500 pardons and 14 commutations to people charged in connection to the January 6 United States Capitol attack. This included former leader of the Proud Boys Enrique Tarrio and founder of the Oath Keepers Stewart Rhodes.
- Ross Ulbricht – founder of the darknet market website Silk Road; sentenced to life imprisonment in 2015; granted a full and unconditional pardon on January 21, 2025
- Andrew Zabavsky and Terence Sutton – convicted of charges related to Karon Hylton-Brown's death after pursuing him for riding a scooter without a helmet in October 2020
- On January 23, 2025, Trump pardoned 23 anti-abortion demonstrators who were convicted of civil rights violations and other crimes which included violating the FACE Act, which prohibits threats and physical obstruction at reproductive clinics or places of worship.
- On February 10, 2025, Trump granted a pardon to former Illinois governor Rod Blagojevich, whose sentence Trump had previously commuted.
- Devon Archer – granted a full and unconditional pardon on March 26, 2025, for offenses against the United States in the case of United States v. Archer, l:16-cr-371
- George Santos – On October 17, 2025, Trump commuted Santos' more-than seven-year prison sentence for fraud and identity theft, ordering his immediate release.
- Changpeng Zhao – founder and former CEO of the cryptocurrency exchange Binance; convicted in 2024 for failing to maintain an effective anti-money-laundering program and sentenced to four months in prison; granted a full and unconditional pardon on October 23, 2025.
- Henry Cuellar – granted an unconditional pardon by Trump on December 3, 2025; indicted on charges related to bribery, foreign influence, and money laundering with the Azerbaijani government in May 2024 in relation to Azerbaijan's Caviar diplomacy lobbying strategy.
- HDR Global Trading Ltd. was the first coproration to ever be pardoned, by being granted an unconditional pardon on 27 March 2025. The company, which owned BitMEX, was fined $100 million for flauting Anti-Money Laundering Laws.
- Ozy Media inc. – granted an unconditional pardon including to any outstanding penalties for the company, amounting to $96 million, on 28 March 2025. Carlos Watson, the co-founder of Ozy Media was also pardoned. The pardon came the day before Watson was due to begin his prison sentence.

== Joe Biden ==
Democratic president Joe Biden pardoned, commuted, or rescinded the convictions of 4,245 people. Among them are:

- On April 26, 2022, Biden issued 3 full pardons and 75 commutations.
  - Abraham Bolden; former Secret Service agent and first African-American Secret Service agent assigned to the Presidential Protective Division; charged and convicted of bribery in 1964
- On October 1, 2022, Biden granted clemency to Franqui Flores and Efrain Antonio Campo Flores, two Venezuelans who are nephews of Nicolás Maduro's wife involved in the Narcosobrinos affair in 2015, as part of a prisoner exchange. Among the released American detainees were five oil executives, part of the group known as the Citgo Six.
- On October 6, 2022, Biden pardoned all those convicted of what was previously the federal offense of simple possession of marijuana, totaling 6,500, via Proclamation 10467. This excluded non-U.S. citizens and those who were considered illegal immigrants at the time of their arrest.
- On December 30, 2022, Biden issued 6 pardons.
  - Beverly Ann Ibn-Tamas, for second-degree murder in alleged self-defense against her abusive husband in 1977
  - Charlie Byrnes Jackson, one count of possession and sale of distilled spirits without tax stamps in 1964
  - Vincente Ray Flores, for consuming drugs while serving in the military in 2006
  - John Dix Nock III, for renting and making for use, as an owner, a place for the purpose of manufacturing marijuana plants in 1996
  - Edward Lincoln De Coito III, for conspiracy to distribute marijuana in 1995
  - Gary Parks Davis, for illegal use of communication facility to facilitate unlawful cocaine transaction in 1978
- On September 14, 2023, Biden issued 3 pardons as part of a prisoner exchange with Iran.
  - Kaveh L. Afrasiabi – conspiracy to act as an unregistered agent of a foreign principal; acting as an unregistered agent of a foreign principal in 2021
  - Amin Hasanzadeh – conspiracy to unlawfully export technology to Iran and to defraud the United States; unlawful export of technology to Iran (seven counts)
  - Reza Sarhangpour Kafrani – conspiracy to unlawfully export goods to Iran via the United Arab Emirates, and to defraud the United States; unlawful exports and attempted unlawful export of goods to Iran via the United Arab Emirates (two counts); failure to file electronic export information; international money laundering (six counts)
- On December 20, 2023, Biden pardoned Colombian businessman Alex Saab as part of a prisoner exchange with Venezuela. Saab was detained on charges of conspiracy to commit money laundering and laundering of monetary instruments (eight counts).
- On April 24, 2024, Biden pardoned 11 people who were dealing with drugs.
- On November 22, 2024, Biden granted clemency to 3 Chinese citizens as a part of a U.S. exchange deal with China.
  - Jin Shanlin – former doctoral student; sentenced to over eight years in prison for possession of child pornography
  - Xu Yanjun – alleged spy for China’s Ministry of State Security; serving a 20-year sentence for espionage crimes and attempting to steal trade secrets from several U.S. aviation and aerospace companies
  - Ji Chaoqun – enlisted in the U.S. Army Reserves and reporting to Xu, who was serving an eight-year sentence
- On December 1, 2024, Biden pardoned his son, Hunter Biden, who was convicted of illegally buying and possessing a gun in June 2024. Hunter Biden had also pleaded guilty to nine tax related charges in September 2024. The pardon explicitly grants clemency for "any potential federal crimes that Hunter Biden may have committed 'from January 1, 2014 through December 1, 2024.'" Prior to this, Joe Biden had repeatedly promised throughout his presidency he would not pardon his son, having said "No one is above the law" in relation to both his son's upcoming trial and the guilty verdict of Donald Trump's court trial. In a letter addressing the pardon he asserted that he had felt that Hunter Biden had been "selectively, and unfairly, prosecuted" in an effort he claimed had been instigated by his political opponents.
- On December 12, 2024, Biden commuted the sentences of 1,499 people and pardoned another 39 convicted of non-violent offenses who had been released from prison to home incarceration during the COVID-19 pandemic, in the "largest single-day grant of clemency in modern history". This included commuting the sentence of Michael Conahan, involved in the kids for cash scandal, and Rita Crundwell, who defrauded Dixon, Illinois over $50 million.
- On December 23, 2024, Biden commuted the sentences of 37 of 40 federal death row inmates to life in prison without possibility of parole. Biden stated he was "more convinced than ever that we must stop the use of the death penalty at the federal level."
  - The 37 reprieved inmates include:
    - Thomas Steven Sanders, convicted of first-degree murder in the death of a 12-year-old girl in Catahoula Parish, Louisiana in 2010
    - Brandon Michael Council, who was convicted of the 2017 CresCom bank murders, in which he shot and killed two female bank employees during a bank robbery.
    - Ricardo Sanchez Jr. and Daniel Troya, convicted of carjacking and murdering a family of four at Florida's Turnpike in 2006.
    - Billie Allen, a man convicted of bank robbery and murder of a security guard
    - Richard Allen Jackson, convicted in the United States District Court for the Western District of North Carolina for the first degree murder of Karen Styles with firearm used and carried during and in relation to crime of violence (kidnapping, aggravated sexual abuse, and murder)
    - Len Davis, a former New Orleans police officer who operated a drug ring and arranged a woman's murder
    - Aquilia Marcivicci Barnette, a man convicted of the 1996 murder of 23-year-old woman Robin Williams in Roanoke, North Carolina and 22-year-old man Donald Allen during a carjacking in Charlotte, North Carolina
    - Jorge Avila-Torrez, convicted of first-degree murder in the death of Petty Officer Second Class Amanda Jean Snell at Joint Base Myer–Henderson Hall
    - Jurijus Kadamovas and Iouri Mikhel, convicted of kidnapping and murdering 5 people in Southern California.
    - Marvin Gabrion, convicted in 2002 of kidnapping and murdering Rachel Timmerman who had previously accused Gabrion of raping her.
  - The three remaining who were not commuted were all either convicted of terrorism or hate-motivated mass murders:
    - Robert Bowers, the perpetrator in the Pittsburgh synagogue shooting
    - Dylann Roof, who committed the 2015 Charleston church shooting
    - Dzhokhar Tsarnaev, who carried out the 2013 Boston Marathon bombing.
- On January 17, 2025, Biden commuted the sentences of 2,490 people.
- On January 19, 2025, Biden pardoned former Chairman of the Joint Chiefs of Staff General Mark Milley, former Chief Medical Advisor to the President Anthony Fauci, members of Congress and staff who served on the United States House Select Committee on the January 6 Attack, and the U.S. Capitol and D.C. Metropolitan police officers who testified before the Select Committee, in his final hours of office. Later that day, he also granted pardons for three of his siblings and two of their spouses, former chairman of the Kentucky Democratic Party Jerry Lundergan, and commuted the life imprisonment of Native American activist Leonard Peltier to home imprisonment for life.

== See also ==
- Federal pardons in the United States
