= Tara Setmayer =

American political commentator (born 1975)

- Born: Tara Olivia Setmayer; September 9, 1975 (age 50); New York City, New York, U.S.
- Education: Paramus High School, New Jersey
- Alma mater: George Washington University (BA)
- Years active: 1998–present
- Employer(s): CNN, ABC
- Political party: Republican (1993–2020); Independent (2020–present)
- Website: Official website

Tara Olivia Setmayer (born September 9, 1975) is the co-founder and CEO of The Seneca Project. She is a former CNN political commentator, contributor to ABC News and former GOP communications director on Capitol Hill. She has appeared on ABC's The View, ABC's Good Morning America, and on HBO's Real Time with Bill Maher. On January 9, 2020, Setmayer was named as a Harvard Institute of Politics Spring 2020 Resident Fellow. Also in January 2020, she joined The Lincoln Project, where she served as a senior advisor and host of the live show The Breakdown alongside co-founder Rick Wilson, on the organization's streaming channel, LPTV, until June 2024 when she departed the organization without public explanation.

Setmayer is a University of Virginia Center for Politics Resident Scholar (2020–present.) In collaboration with the Center for Politics, she narrated the 3-part documentary, Dismantling Democracy, which aired nationally on PBS stations in September 2020 and is currently streaming on Amazon Prime.

After spending 27 years in political communications with the Republican Party, Setmayer publicly left the GOP in November 2020.

== Early life and education ==
Setmayer was born in 1975 in Queens, New York, but raised in Paramus, a borough of Bergen County in northern New Jersey. She is an only child, raised by a single mom, Deborah, who had been a Broadway dancer. Deborah was 21 and single when Tara was born, and left her career to raise Tara.

Tara's family has been longtime residents of Paramus. Her grandfather, Emil Setmayer, served 40 years with the Paramus Police Department, retiring as captain, and also spent 71 years with the Paramus Company 03 Volunteer Fire Department. She was educated at Paramus High School, a public high school in Bergen County, New Jersey, from which she graduated in 1993, followed by The George Washington University in Washington, D.C., where she majored in political science with a focus on public policy and journalism.

Setmayer is of mixed heritage: Her mother is of German and Italian descent and her father is of Afro-Guatemalan descent.

== Career ==
In the early 2000s, Setmayer served as a former research fellow and communications specialist for the Coalition on Urban Renewal & Education (CURE), a non-profit organization dealing with the impact of social policies on America's inner cities and the poor. She also served as a political trainer for GOPAC, a conservative organization specializing in educating, organizing and training grassroots Republicans intending to run for public office.

For over two years, Setmayer served as a community liaison advocating on a variety of issues including affordable housing and services for the chronically homeless and children in South Florida where she co-founded a faith-based homeless program.

From 2006 to 2013, Setmayer worked in the U.S. House of Representatives as the Communications Director for Republican Representative Dana Rohrabacher of California, during which she handled immigration and federal law enforcement policy issues, and led the national effort to free Border Patrol Agents Ignacio Ramos and Jose Compean through a presidential commutation.

She was a regular panelist on the women's issues program To the Contrary on PBS, and was featured in several local and national publications including The Wall Street Journal, The Hill newspaper where she was included in the publication's annual 50 Most Beautiful list in 2010, and Ebony magazine, on terrestrial radio syndication and satellite, News & Notes and Tell Me More on NPR and XM Radio. As a media commentator, she has appeared on a range of television programs on CNN, CNN International, ABC, Fox News, MSNBC and HBO.

In 2017, Setmayer was named as a board director for Stand Up Republic, a non profit organization formed in the wake of the 2016 election of Donald Trump to unite Americans behind the defense of democratic norms, ideals and institutions.

Setmayer focuses her "tell it like it is" commentary and analysis on political issues that impact America's future. During the 2016 presidential election cycle, she earned the reputation of being an outspoken conservative critic of Donald Trump and challenged his surrogates on the veracity of their claims. Vulture.com recognized her as one of 2016's "Top 20 Election Coverage Stars" on TV.

Prior to joining ABC, Setmayer was a CNN political commentator from 2014 through the 2016 presidential election cycle, regularly appearing on CNN's New Day, Erin Burnett OutFront, Anderson Cooper 360° and CNN Tonight with Don Lemon news analysis shows, and through 2017 subsequently appeared on CNN political panels, where she was credited as an ABC News guest contributor. Setmayer rejoined CNN as a commentator in January 2018 through the inauguration of President Biden in January 2021. Today, she regularly appears as an on-air commentator on MSNBC and various other news outlets in the US and abroad.

She has written for Cosmopolitan, Bloomberg Opinion, The Daily Beast, NBC Think and CNN.com. She is a frequent guest-host for The Michael Smerconish Program on SiriusXM's POTUS channel.

== Personal life ==
In 2013, Setmayer married a federal law enforcement officer. Both are fans of the New York Giants; their cat is named Tiki. They live in the suburbs of Washington, D.C.
