= Banamex v. Narco News =

- Court: Supreme Court of New York
- Full case name: Banamex, Plaintiff v. Mario Renato Menendez Rodriguez, Al Giordano, and Narco News, Defendant
- Decided: December 5 2001

Holding
- Dismissed

Court membership
- Judge sitting: Justice Paula J. Omansky

Banamex v. Narco News, 2001 603429/00, was a New York Supreme Court case that extended the findings of New York Times Co. v. Sullivan, that freedom of the press applied to an online newspaper's reporting.

The court found that: "Narco News, its website, and the writers who post information, are entitled to all the First Amendment protections accorded a newspaper-magazine or journalist... Furthermore, the nature of the articles printed on the website and Mr. Giordano's statements at Columbia University constitute matters of public concern because the information disseminated relates to the drug trade and its affect [sic] on people living in this hemisphere..."

== Background ==
Narco News published a series of articles relating to the operation of Banamex, one of the largest banks in Mexico, and revealed a pattern of illegal and narcotics-related activity by those at the bank. Banamex filed suit charging that they "have maliciously smeared Banamex with accusations that, among other things, it is controlled and operated by narcotics traffickers and has engaged in illegal activity."

== See also ==
- Banamex
- Narco News
- Al Giordano
- New York Times Co. v. Sullivan
