= Narco News =

Narco News is an online newspaper that covers the "war on drugs" and social movements throughout the Americas. Its articles are available in English and Spanish, with some translations in Italian, French, Portuguese and German. It is funded by the Fund for Authentic Journalism.

The founder and editor of Narco News is the American journalist Al Giordano. The web magazine currently has correspondents in Bolivia, Brazil, Mexico and other Latin American countries.

== Major news reports ==
=== Banamex v. Narco News ===
In 1996, the Mexican newspaper Por Esto! began running reports that Roberto Hernández – at the time the president of the Mexican bank Banamex – was trafficking cocaine on a property he owned near Cancún in the Mexican state of Quintana Roo. Por Esto!'s publisher, Mario Menéndez, was subsequently sued for libel in a Mexican court. The court found that Menéndez had not libeled, a decision upheld on appeal. A third appeal was made and thrown out of court.

Narco News began publishing the same story in English from its website, allowing the story to reach a wider audience. This culminated in a publicity tour in New York, including a forum at Columbia University with both Giordano and Menéndez in attendance. Banamex then sued Narco News and Menéndez together, maintaining that because potentially libelous information in the news stories was repeated in New York, and that the operators of Narco News' web host were headquartered in New York (although the servers were in Maryland), New York therefore had jurisdiction over the matter.

Aside from the propriety of a foreign company filing a case in New York for libel against its president, the case also raised several questions over the rights of websites:

"If the National Bank of Mexico can sue a website published from Mexico, over stories investigated, reported and uploaded from Mexico, and sue that website in New York, that would set a dangerous precedent that chills free speech throughout the internet. If you say something that a large corporation doesn't like, not only can you be hauled into court in Mexico, but you can be hauled into court anywhere in the world."

— Al Giordano

Because of the potential ramifications of the case, The Electronic Frontier Foundation offered itself as amicus curiae. Thomas Lesser, who had previously been Abbie Hoffman's lawyer in his case against the CIA, represented Narco News while Giordano represented himself. Mendéndez hired Martin Garbus as his lawyer, although the court found that it did not have personal jurisdiction over Menéndez.

The New York Supreme Court found that Narco News had not libeled; in fact, the court had not been offered any evidence to refute either Por Esto! or Narco News' claims. The court set a precedent when it found that Narco News, despite being a website, was similar enough to traditional media that the first amendment applied to it and similar sites as it did any other news-based media. The text of the decision reads:

"Narco News, its website, and the writers who post information, are entitled to all the First Amendment protections accorded a newspaper-magazine or journalist... Furthermore, the nature of the articles printed on the website and Mr. Giordano's statements at Columbia University constitute matters of public concern because the information disseminated relates to the drug trade and its affect [sic] on people living in this hemisphere..."

— Judge Paula J. Omansky

=== House of Death ===
Narco News was the first publication to investigate the cover-up of the "House of Death" mass murders in 2004, which involved an U.S. Immigration and Customs Enforcement (ICE) informant assisting a cell of the Juarez Drug Cartel in planning and carrying out the murders of multiple people as part of a U.S. government-sponsored deep cover operation. In the wake of publishing a series of reports on the House of Death case, the investigative journalist Bill Conroy received intimidating visits at his office and his home, and a visit to his employer from officers by ICE officers, an event that prompted a letter by Congresswoman Cynthia McKinney reprimanding United States Attorney Johnny Sutton for "an attempt ... to intimidate a journalist who has reported facts that are embarrassing to him".
