= C. C. Moore =

C. C. Moore may refer to:

- Clement Clarke Moore (1779–1863), American scholar and author of "A Visit from St. Nicholas"
- Charles Chilton Moore (1837–1906), American atheist
- Charles C. Moore (1866–1958), governor of Idaho, 1923-1927
- Calvin C. Moore (1936–2023), American mathematician
