= Harriet Miers =

American lawyer and Supreme Court nominee (born 1945)

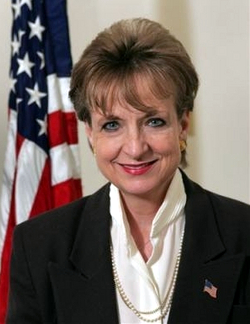
- Official portrait, 2005

White House Counsel
- In office February 3, 2005 – January 31, 2007
- President: George W. Bush
- Preceded by: Alberto Gonzales
- Succeeded by: Fred Fielding

White House Deputy Chief of Staff for Policy
- In office June 6, 2003 – February 3, 2005
- President: George W. Bush
- Preceded by: Joshua Bolten
- Succeeded by: Karl Rove

White House Staff Secretary
- In office January 20, 2001 – June 6, 2003
- President: George W. Bush
- Preceded by: Lisel Loy
- Succeeded by: Brett Kavanaugh

Chair of Texas Lottery Commission
- In office 1995–2000

Member-at-Large Dallas City Council
- In office 1989–1991

Personal details
- Born: Harriet Ellan Miers; August 10, 1945 (age 81) Dallas, Texas, U.S.
- Party: Republican
- Education: Southern Methodist University (BA, JD)

Harriet Ellan Miers (/maɪərs/; born August 10, 1945) is an American lawyer who served as White House counsel to President George W. Bush from 2005 to 2007.

A member of the Republican Party since 1988, she previously served as White House staff secretary from 2001 to 2003 and White House Deputy Chief of Staff for Policy from 2003 until 2005. In 2005, Bush nominated Miers to be an associate justice of the Supreme Court of the United States, replacing the retiring Justice Sandra Day O'Connor. In the face of bipartisan opposition and questions about her fitness for the court, Miers asked Bush to withdraw her nomination a little over three weeks after it was announced. In 2007, Miers returned to private practice, becoming a partner in the litigation and public policy group at Locke Lord.

== Early life and education ==
Miers was born in Dallas and spent most of her life there until she moved to Washington, D.C. in 2001 to work in the Bush administration. She has called herself a "Texan through and through". She is the fourth of the five children of real estate investor Harris Wood Miers Sr., and his wife, the former Erma (Sally) Grace Richardson. Miers graduated from Hillcrest High School in Dallas in 1963.

Miers entered Southern Methodist University intending to become a teacher. The economic plight of her family was so dire that she almost dropped out in her freshman year, but she found part-time work to put her through college. Then her father had a debilitating stroke. When a lawyer helped organize her family's financial situation, Miers was inspired to enter law school. In 1967, Miers graduated from Southern Methodist University with a bachelor's degree in mathematics. In 1970, she graduated from its Dedman School of Law with a Juris Doctor degree.

== Career ==
In the summer of 1969, between her second and third years of law school, Miers worked as a clerk for Belli, Ashe, Ellison, Choulos & Lieff, the San Francisco law firm founded by Melvin Belli. Miers was immersed in tort law. Her supervisor was Robert Lieff, then a partner in the Belli firm and later a founder of the nationally prominent plaintiffs' law firm Lieff Cabraser. In a 2005 interview, Lieff said Miers "saw what we did for people who needed to get a lawyer and were only able to get a lawyer by a contingent fee."

After graduating from law school, from 1970 to 1972 Miers was a law clerk for the Chief Judge of the U.S. District Court for the Northern District of Texas, Joe Ewing Estes. She was admitted to the State Bar of Texas in 1970 and to the DC bar in 1997.

In the late 1990s, while Miers was on the advisory board for Southern Methodist University's law school, she helped create and fund a women's studies lecture series named after pioneering Texas lawyer Louise B. Raggio. Raggio, who died in 2011, knew Miers for nearly 40 years, since Miers was a student at SMU. Miers was one class behind Raggio's son at SMU, and Raggio became a mentor to Miers; years later she served as a close advisor to Miers during the Texas Bar race. "I was interested in having a woman president", Raggio said. "She was an electable woman, a woman with a big firm behind her. Women's groups supported her because they wanted to show that a woman would be a competent president."

From 1972 until 2001 Miers worked for the Dallas law firm of Locke, Liddell & Sapp (and predecessor firms before mergers). She was the first female lawyer the firm hired and later became its president. When the merger that created Locke, Liddell & Sapp took place in 1999, she became the co-managing partner of a legal business with more than 400 lawyers. In 2000 the firm settled a lawsuit for $22 million that accused the firm of having "aided a client in defrauding investors". According to the Class Action Reporter, Miers "said the firm denies liability in connection with its representation of Erxleben. 'Obviously, we evaluated that this was the right time to settle and to resolve this matter and that it was in the best interest of the firm to do so,' Miers said."

As a commercial litigator, Miers represented clients including Microsoft and the Walt Disney Company.

In 1985, Miers became the first female president of the Dallas Bar Association. In 1992, she became the first woman to head the State Bar of Texas. From 1989 to 1998, she headed the board of editors for the American Bar Association Journal. From 2000 to 2001, Miers chaired the ABA's Commission on Multi-Jurisdictional Practice.

In 1989, Miers formally registered with the Republican Party and was elected to a two-year term as an at-large member of the Dallas City Council. She did not run for reelection in 1991 after a restructure of the city council converted Miers's at-large seat into a single-district seat.

Miers met George W. Bush in January 1989 at an annual Austin dinner for legislators and other important people. Nathan Hecht, a mutual friend and Miers's date, made the introduction. Miers worked as general counsel for Bush's transition team in 1994, when he was first elected governor of Texas. She then became Bush's personal lawyer and worked as a lawyer in his 2000 presidential campaign.

While head of the State Bar of Texas, Miers joined an unsuccessful effort to have the ABA maintain its then-official position of neutrality on abortion. The ABA had adopted abortion neutrality at its 1990 annual meeting in Chicago after strong opposition by the State Bar of Texas to a pro-choice position. By the summer of 1992, at its annual meeting in San Francisco, the issue was again pending before the ABA assembly. Miers, who had not been involved in the Chicago meeting, supported ABA abortion neutrality in San Francisco. At the San Francisco meeting, the ABA Assembly and House of Delegates voted to take a pro-choice position, and the state bar of Texas dropped its plans to ask the ABA's policy-making body to hold a referendum of the group's 370,000 members on the issue.

Since September 1994 (about the same time she began to work for Bush), Miers has contributed to the campaigns of various Republicans, including Kay Bailey Hutchison, Phil Gramm, and Pete Sessions, with recorded contributions to Republican candidates and causes totaling nearly $12,000. She supported Democrats in the 1980s, with recorded contributions to the Democratic National Committee, Lloyd Bentsen's Senate campaign, and Al Gore's 1988 presidential campaign totaling $3,000. Her last recorded contribution to a Democratic cause or campaign was in 1988. Ed Gillespie said she was a "conservative Democrat" at the time.

In April 2007, Locke Lord Bissell & Liddell announced that Miers was returning to the firm. In her new role at the firm, Miers registered with the United States Department of Justice as an agent for the Pakistan Peoples Party and the Embassy of Pakistan.

== Government service ==
In 1995, George W. Bush, then Texas governor, appointed Miers to chair the Texas Lottery Commission. Some have credited Miers with reforming the commission after a previous corruption scandal.

Her tenure has also been criticized. In 1997, the commission hired Lawrence Littwin as executive director but fired him five months later. At the time, the contract to operate the lottery was held by the politically connected GTECH Corporation, which had obtained the contract with the help of former Lieutenant Governor of Texas Ben Barnes. Littwin, as director, began an investigation into whether GTECH had made illegal campaign contributions and whether it owed the commission millions of dollars for breaches of its contract. He said Miers ordered him to stop the investigation, and brought a lawsuit alleging that he was fired in retaliation for the investigation and to ensure that GTECH would keep its contract.

According to Texans for Public Justice, GTECH paid Littwin $300,000 to settle the suit.

Miers resigned from the lottery commission in 2000, a year before her term ended. She said her resignation had nothing to do with lagging sales in the system's biggest game, Lotto Texas, but rather that she wanted to allow her successor time to prepare for rebidding the lottery's primary operator contract.

There was some speculation during Bush's 2000 campaign that he would appoint Miers Attorney General, given his trust in her and his personal attorney and her many appointments during his tenure as governor. This also recalled William French Smith, who was Ronald Reagan's personal attorney before being named Attorney General. Bush nominated John Ashcroft instead.

In January 2001, Miers followed Bush to Washington, D.C., serving as Assistant to the President and Staff Secretary during the first two years of his presidency. In that role, she opposed the administration's 2001 decision to stop cooperating with the ABA rating of judicial nominees. In 2003, she was appointed Deputy Chief of Staff for Policy. In November 2004, Bush named her to succeed Alberto Gonzales, his nominee for Attorney General, as White House Counsel, the chief legal adviser for the Office of the President.

Miers is said to be one of Bush's closest personal friends and has praised him effusively. According to former Bush speechwriter David Frum, Miers called Bush the most brilliant man she had ever met and the "best governor ever". She also said that "serving President Bush and Mrs. Bush is an impossible-to-describe privilege" and that Bush's personal qualities "make a brighter future for our nation and people all around the world possible".

Miers's last public speech before her nomination was to the North Dallas Chamber of Commerce on June 2, 2005.

== Supreme Court nomination and withdrawal ==
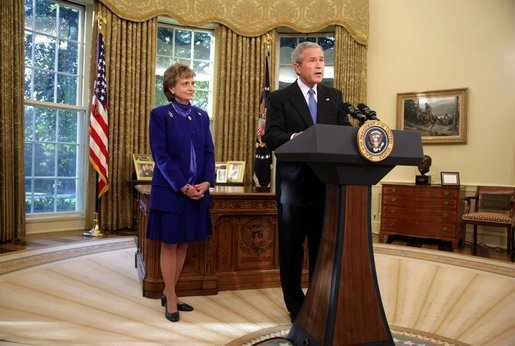
President George W. Bush nominates Harriet Miers on October 3, 2005.

On July 1, 2005, Supreme Court Justice Sandra Day O'Connor announced her intention to retire upon the confirmation of a successor. Bush appointed Miers as head of the search committee for candidates. On July 19, Bush nominated John Roberts to replace O'Connor. Several weeks later, Chief Justice William Rehnquist died of thyroid cancer. Bush then withdrew Roberts from consideration as O'Connor's replacement, instead nominating him for Chief Justice. The Senate confirmed Roberts on September 29.

Meanwhile, Bush considered nominating Miers as O'Connor's successor, factoring in suggestions by Senators Arlen Specter and Patrick Leahy that the nominee should come from outside the appellate court system. This caused several commentators to draw parallels with the 2000 election, when Dick Cheney, the head of Bush's vice-presidential search committee, was selected as the nominee.

On October 3, 2005, Bush nominated Miers to serve as an associate justice of the Supreme Court, saying, "Harriet Miers will be the type of judge I said I would nominate: a good conservative judge." Miers's nomination was criticized by people of various political views because she had never served as a judge at any level, was perceived to lack intellectual rigor, had close personal ties to Bush, and had no clear record on issues she would likely encounter as a Supreme Court Justice. Many notable conservatives vigorously criticized her nomination, and numerous conservative groups normally considered part of Bush's political base planned to mount an organized opposition campaign.

Miers met with the Senate Judiciary Committee after her nomination and was widely deemed ill-prepared and uninformed on the law. Senator Tom Coburn told her privately that she "flunked" and was "going to have to say something next time". Miers had difficulty expressing her views and explaining basic constitutional law concepts. She had no experience in constitutional law and little litigation experience; at her Texas law firm, she had been more of a manager. In addition, Miers had rarely handled appeals and did not understand the complicated constitutional questions senators asked her. To White House lawyers, Miers was "less an attorney than a law firm manager and bar association president".

In an unprecedented move, Senate Judiciary Committee Chairman Arlen Specter and ranking Democrat Patrick Leahy requested that Miers redo some of her answers to the questionnaire the committee had submitted to her, calling her responses "inadequate", "insufficient", and "insulting" because of their inaccuracy or lack of detail. Miers was also said to have privately expressed a belief in the right to privacy to Specter, only to later deny that she had done so. Her answers included an error on constitutional law: she mentioned an explicit constitutional right to proportional representation. Many court rulings have found that legislative and other districts of unequal population violate the Equal Protection Clause, but the United States Constitution does not mention a right to proportional districts.

Overall, senators were dissatisfied with their private meetings with Miers. Republican senators Lindsey Graham and Sam Brownback drafted a letter asking the President's office to turn over legal memoranda and briefs Miers had written for Bush, to clarify her views on political matters. Brownback and Graham knew the memos were protected by executive privilege, that the White House was not required to turn them over, and that Miers could refuse to deliver the memos and then ostensibly step down on principle. Miers later used this request as part of her strategy for stepping down. In her letter withdrawing her nomination, she said the senators' request for confidential documents could damage the executive branch's independence. On October 19, Specter and Leahy announced their intent to begin confirmation hearings for Miers on November 7.

On Meet the Press on October 23, Senator Chuck Schumer said: "if you were to hold the vote today, she would not get a majority, either in the Judiciary Committee or on the floor", but on Face the Nation the same day, Specter said that most senators were waiting for the hearings to make up their minds.

On October 27, Miers asked Bush to withdraw her nomination, citing fears that it would create a "burden for the White House and its staff". Bush said the Senate's interest in internal White House documents "would undermine a president's ability to receive candid counsel" and that he had "reluctantly accepted" her request. Miers was the first Supreme Court nominee to withdraw under duress since Douglas H. Ginsburg in 1987.

On October 31, Bush nominated Samuel Alito to the seat. The Senate confirmed Alito on January 31, 2006. Miers remained White House Counsel for another year, announcing her resignation on January 4, 2007.

== Resignation and departure from the White House ==
Upon becoming Bush's chief of staff in April 2006, Joshua Bolten pressed for Miers's resignation, but Bush rejected the idea. After the 2006 elections, when Democrats won a majority in both chambers of Congress, Bolten again asked for her departure, arguing that Bush needed an aggressive lawyer and increased staff for the Office of Legal Counsel to fend off congressional inquiries and subpoenas. This effort succeeded; Miers announced her resignation on January 4, 2007, and left on January 31. In April 2007, Miers rejoined her previous firm, Locke Liddell & Sapp (later Locke Lord), and became a partner in its litigation and public policy group.

== Dismissal of U.S. attorneys controversy ==
2006 dismissal of U.S. attorneys controversy
- Timeline
- Summary of attorneys
- Congressional hearings
- List of dismissed attorneys
- All related articles

In January 2006, Kyle Sampson, chief of staff to Attorney General Alberto Gonzales, wrote to Miers to recommend that the Department of Justice and the Office of the Counsel to the President work together to seek the replacement of a limited number of U.S. Attorneys, saying that limiting the number of attorneys "targeted for removal and replacement" would "mitigat[e] the shock to the system that would result from an across-the-board firing." In March 2007, the White House suggested that the plan came from Miers, who had left the White House in January, before the dismissal received public attention. The firings led to Congressional investigations into the dismissals.

On June 13, 2007, the Senate and House Judiciary Committees subpoenaed Miers and Sara M. Taylor, former deputy assistant to Bush and the White House director of political affairs, asking them to produce documents and appear before the committees to testify about what role, if any, they had in the U.S. Attorney dismissals. The Judiciary Committee requested that Miers appear before it on July 11, 2007. The White House reiterated its longstanding demand that no past or present White House officials be permitted to testify under oath before the panels, and that private interviews, not under oath, and without transcripts be permitted. The Chairs of the House and Senate Judiciary Committees reiterated that those terms were unacceptable. Ranking member of the Senate Judiciary Committee Arlen Specter said the committee had "really had no response from the White House" about possible testimony on the U.S. attorneys' dismissal, prompting the subpoenas. Miers refused to appear before Congress because Bush ordered her not to. On July 25, the House Judiciary Committee voted 22–17 to cite Miers for contempt of Congress for failing to appear before the committee in response to its subpoena. On February 14, 2008, the full House of Representatives voted to cite her for contempt by a vote of 223–32. Many Republicans walked out of the chamber in protest, deriding the speaker's priorities in calling the vote rather than a vote on a surveillance bill.

On March 4, 2009, Miers and former White House Deputy Chief of Staff Karl Rove agreed to testify under oath before Congress about the firings of U.S. attorneys.

== Personal life ==
Miers is a close friend of former Secretary of State Condoleezza Rice and former Secretary of Agriculture Ann Veneman. Texas Supreme Court Justice Nathan Hecht has known her for more than 25 years, over which time they have had an on-again-off-again relationship. After Miers's nomination to the Supreme Court, Hecht was cited as an unofficial spokesperson representing her views.

In 1979, after she made partner in her law firm, she became an evangelical Christian after a series of long discussions with Hecht, who was her colleague at the firm.

== See also ==
- Unsuccessful nominations to the Supreme Court of the United States
- List of first women lawyers and judges in Texas

Political offices
Preceded by Lisel Loy	White House Staff Secretary; 2001–2003	Succeeded by Brett Kavanaugh
Preceded by Joshua Bolten	White House Deputy Chief of Staff for Policy; 2003–2005	Succeeded by Karl Rove
Legal offices
Preceded by Alberto Gonzales	White House Counsel; 2005–2007	Succeeded by Fred Fielding
