= Isaac Toussie =

Real estate developer and convicted felon

- Born: Isaac Robert Toussie; May 21, 1972 (age 54)
- Occupation: real estate developer
- Years active: 1993–2003
- Known for: fraud conviction, revoked presidential pardon
- Criminal charges: making false statements, mail fraud
- Criminal penalty: 5 months incarceration, 3 years probation, $10,000 fine

Isaac Robert Toussie (born May 21, 1972) is an American real estate developer convicted of fraudulently obtaining mortgages from the Department of Housing and Urban Development. On December 23, 2008, Toussie was granted a pardon by President George W. Bush; however, this pardon was revoked the following day, amid controversy over its apparent impropriety.

== Crimes and conviction ==
Toussie entered the real estate business with his father, Robert Toussie, in 1993. In 1999, Isaac Toussie was charged with making false statements to the Department of Housing and Urban Development in obtaining mortgages, and with mail fraud, stemming from a letter he sent to Suffolk County officials which overstated the value of a property the county would later buy from Toussie's father.

Toussie pleaded guilty on May 24, 2001, to the false statement charge. He subsequently pleaded guilty on December 10, 2002, to the mail fraud charge. In July 2003, Toussie was sentenced to five months of incarceration, followed by three years of probation, and on September 22, 2003, he was fined $10,000.

Isaac Toussie and his father are among the co-defendants in an ongoing class action suit, filed in 2001 by 400 families who claim they were sold shoddily-constructed properties at inflated prices, and told that property taxes would be reduced or deferred. Homeowners paid between US$160,000 and $200,000 for the Suffolk County and Staten Island homes. The suit is the largest ever real estate discrimination suit in New York State.

Toussie placed advertisements in New York City newspapers, offering affordable housing and easy financing, even to individuals with poor credit. The suit claims that these ads included fake endorsements from black celebrities, including Whoopi Goldberg and Maya Angelou. Investigators discovered that Toussie had worked with various real estate attorneys, mortgage bankers and home appraisers to get mortgages for hundreds of low-income home-buyers who wouldn't otherwise qualify, and then sell those same people low-quality, overpriced houses that they couldn't afford.

== Pardon and revocation ==
On December 23, 2008, President Bush granted a pardon to Toussie, angering people who felt Toussie had defrauded them. However, the pardon was withdrawn the next day, following a report by the New York Daily News that Toussie's father, Robert Toussie, had given $28,500 to the Republican Party and $2,300 to the presidential campaign of U.S. Senator John McCain. White House press secretary Dana Perino stated that the pardon would be reviewed, in light of the new information. A White House press release read, in part:

Based on information that has subsequently come to light, the President has directed the Pardon Attorney not to execute and deliver a Grant of Clemency to Mr. Toussie. The Pardon Attorney has not provided a recommendation on Mr. Toussie's case because it was filed less than five years from completion of his sentence. The President believes that the Pardon Attorney should have an opportunity to review this case before a decision on clemency is made.

The action by Mr. Bush to revoke the pardon is considered unprecedented, and it is unclear that the president has the power to withdraw a pardon. However, the Justice Department has stated that the pardon was never official, having never been delivered to the person who requested it, and that Toussie would have no legal ground on which to challenge the withdrawal. It appears that the pardon would have made it possible for Toussie to re-enter the real estate business in New York state, which he would not be able to do as a felon.

The pardon was also unusual in that it violated a Justice Department guideline stipulating that convicted criminals not be considered for pardons less than five years after the completion of their sentences. The president is not legally bound by the Justice Department guideline. Toussie's legal representation apparently bypassed normal procedure, and appealed directly to the administration, rather than going through the Justice Department or the chain of command. Toussie's lawyer, Bernard Berenson, was formerly part of the Office of the White House Counsel. White House Counsel Fred Fielding approved the application for the pardon.

On December 27, the Daily News published a photograph of the elder Toussie shaking hands with President Bush, posed in front of an American flag.

== See also ==
- List of people pardoned or granted clemency by the president of the United States
