= Johnny Sutton =

American lawyer

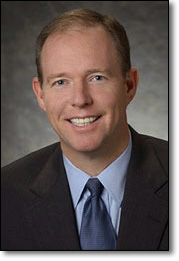

United States Attorney for the Western District of Texas
- In office 2001–2009
- Succeeded by: Robert L. Pitman

Personal details
- Born: 1960 (age 65–66) Houston, Texas, U.S.
- Party: Republican
- Education: University of Texas
- Occupation: Attorney
- Known for: United States Attorney
- Website: JohnnySutton.com

Johnny Sutton (born 1960) is an American attorney who served as United States Attorney for the Western District of Texas from 2001 until 2009, and chaired the Attorney General's Advisory Committee of United States Attorneys. Sutton is known for the prosecution of United States Border Patrol agents Jose Compean and Ignacio Ramos. He is currently a partner with the law firm Ashcroft Sutton Reyes, LLC in Austin, Texas.

== Background and education ==
Sutton grew up in Houston, Texas. He is the grandson of World Series-winning St. Louis Cardinals manager Johnny Keane. Sutton is a fluent speaker of Spanish.

Sutton graduated from the University of Texas at Austin with a bachelor's degree in International Business in 1983 and then earned a Juris Doctor degree at the University of Texas School of Law in 1987.

== Longhorns baseball ==
Sutton attended UT on a baseball scholarship and played for the Texas Longhorns, where he was a two-year letterman under coach Cliff Gustafson. His teammates at UT included future Major League pitchers Roger Clemens and Calvin Schiraldi. Sutton spent three years as a backup second baseman, with just 50 at-bats in his career prior to the 1983 playoffs. On a hunch, Gustafson put Sutton in the post-season line-up as a left fielder; Sutton hit .454 in the six-game tournament and was named regional MVP as the Longhorns went on to win the College World Series. The 1983 team finished with a 66–14 record.

In various interviews, Gustafson has named Sutton his all-time favorite player. "He sparked us to a regional win and continued to spark us through the national championship," Gustafson said in 1994. "Clemens and Schiraldi got all the hype, but Sutton was the key to the national championship run."

Recently, Kirk Bohls of the Austin American-Statesman, when asked who is most underrated University of Texas athlete ever, responded, "I would say A.J. Abrams in hoops, Robert Brewer maybe in football, Johnny Sutton in baseball."

== Public service ==
=== Harris County ===
From 1988 to 1995, Sutton served as a criminal trial prosecutor in the Harris County District Attorney's Office in Houston, where he tried more than 60 first chair felony jury trials. In 1994, Sutton obtained the death penalty against Raul Villareal in the rape and murder of two teenage girls, Jennifer Ertman and Elizabeth Pena. Four other death penalty verdicts were rendered in the case.

=== Bush administration ===
In 1995, Sutton accepted a position as criminal justice policy director for then-Governor George W. Bush, providing analysis and recommendations for proposed criminal justice laws for Bush to support or veto.

Upon Bush's election as president in 2000, Sutton became coordinator for the Bush-Cheney transition team assigned to the Department of Justice where he served as associate deputy attorney general, initially advising on U.S.-Mexico border issues.

== United States attorney ==
On October 25, 2001, Bush nominated Sutton for U.S. Attorney for the Western District of Texas, one of the nation's busiest criminal dockets, known for its high percentage of drug and immigration crimes and covering 68 counties including Austin, San Antonio, El Paso, and 660 miles of border. Sutton returned to Austin, where he oversaw a staff of 140 lawyers and a changing mission. Traditionally focused on border-related crimes, the U.S. Attorney's office increasingly focused on fighting terrorism.

As U.S. attorney, Sutton prosecuted more than 400 prison gang members, including 19 members of the Texas Syndicate in 2004, and more than 100 public officials, including former Texas Attorney General Dan Morales in 2003 on mail and tax fraud charges. Sutton also supported the buildup of federal resources, from 9,000 to 20,000 border patrol agents, on the Mexico border, and pushed for prosecution of illegal immigrants previously deported, instead of just those who had committed a serious felony.

Sutton was appointed vice chair of the Attorney General's Advisory Committee of United States Attorneys on May 27, 2005. On March 28, 2006, Gonzales elevated Sutton to chair of the committee. In this role, Sutton frequently traveled to Washington to advise the Department of Justice on border-related issues and testify before Congress.

John E. Murphy succeeded Sutton in an acting capacity until the nomination and confirmation of Robert L. Pitman.

=== Prosecution of Compean and Ramos ===
Sutton is perhaps best known for his prosecution of former Border Patrol agents Jose Compean and Ignacio Ramos for misconduct following the shooting and wounding of Osvaldo Aldrete-Davila, a narcotics smuggler who had illegally crossed the Mexico border near Fabens, Texas. Compean and Ramos were convicted of assault with serious bodily injury, assault with a deadly weapon, discharge of a firearm in relation to a crime of violence and a civil rights charge, in addition to obstruction of justice charges. In October 2006 they were sentenced to twelve years and eleven years and one day, respectively.

Sutton drew criticism from some politicians and anti-illegal-immigration activists, especially on talk radio and the Internet. CNN anchor Lou Dobbs devoted more than one hundred broadcast segments to the case. Deputy Attorney General Paul McNulty, asked in 2007 whether Sutton's job was in danger over controversy associated with the case, said "No." Sutton told the Texas Monthly: "All people have heard is that two American heroes are in prison for doing their job and that a drug dealer has been set free. If those were the facts, I'd be furious too. But the evidence is overwhelming that these guys committed a very serious crime." On January 19, 2009, President Bush commuted the sentences of both Compean and Ramos, effectively ending their prison term on March 20, 2009.

=== "House of Death" case ===
According to The Observer, in August 2003, the U.S. Department of Justice was informed that a paid informant for Immigration and Customs Enforcement (ICE) had participated in murders carried out by a drug cartel in Ciudad Juárez, Mexico, operating out of a condo in Juárez where a dozen people were tortured, killed, and buried in the backyard. The informant was, at the time, cooperating in an ongoing cigarette-smuggling investigation. As Sutton was U.S. Attorney for West Texas, this information passed through his office to Deputy Assistant Attorney General John G. Malcolm. The DoJ decided to allow ICE to continue working with the informant rather than act on the information about the murders. Eventually, Mexican police uncovered what had happened, raided the house, and exhumed the bodies. This was not the first narco-cemetery to be discovered in Mexico, but due to the number of bodies and the controversy surrounding ICE knowledge of cartel operations, the event became publicized and known as the "House of Death" case. Sutton later filed an indictment against a cartel lieutenant, Heriberto Santillan-Tabares, for drug trafficking and five murders, though the murder charges were later canceled by Sutton in a plea bargain. Sutton was criticized afterward by some observers, including University of Texas-El Paso law professor Bill Weaver, for not taking action to shut down the operation earlier and recommending the DoJ refrain from commenting to the media about the case. On April 19, 2006, Sutton announced a plea bargain arrangement with Santillan including a 25-year jail sentence, with no murder charge or plea included. Furthermore, Sutton was criticized by former Congresswoman Cynthia McKinney for approaching journalist Bill Conroy in an alleged attempt to dissuade him from covering the story: McKinney admonished Sutton for "an attempt ... to intimidate a journalist who has reported facts that are embarrassing to him".

=== Other casework ===
In addition to Morales, Sutton's notable cases included prosecution of two San Antonio city council members and two lawyers on charges involved in a bribery scheme related to a city contract, obtaining convictions in 2005. Other widely covered prosecutions included an El Paso counterfeiting ring, a Permian Basin heroin and cocaine operation, the leader of an Austin-based illegal immigrant smuggling organization, and Kickapoo tribal leaders accused of embezzling $900,000 in casino and health-care revenues for personal and political use.

On October 8, 2018, the University of Texas at Austin confirmed it had hired Sutton to investigate claims that Texas State Senator Charles Schwertner sent lewd messages and pictures to a graduate student at the university.

== The Ashcroft Firm ==
Sutton resigned as the U.S. Attorney effective April 19, 2009. He announced on April 24, 2009, that he had joined the Austin, Texas office The Ashcroft Firm, chaired by former U.S. Attorney General John Ashcroft, to be known in Texas as Ashcroft Sutton Ratcliffe, LLC. Sutton's focus at The Ashcroft Group is corporate representation and compliance, strategic planning and risk management.
