= Fred F. Fielding =

American lawyer (born 1939)

Fred Fielding
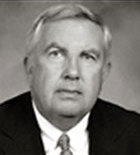

White House Counsel
- In office January 31, 2007 – January 20, 2009
- President: George W. Bush
- Preceded by: Harriet Miers
- Succeeded by: Greg Craig
- In office January 20, 1981 – May 23, 1986
- President: Ronald Reagan
- Preceded by: Lloyd Cutler
- Succeeded by: Peter Wallison

Personal details
- Born: March 21, 1939 (age 87) Philadelphia, Pennsylvania, U.S.
- Party: Republican
- Spouse: Maria Dugger
- Education: Gettysburg College (BA); University of Virginia (JD)

Fred Fisher Fielding (born March 21, 1939) is an American lawyer. He held the office of White House Counsel for U.S. Presidents Ronald Reagan and George W. Bush in addition to serving as an associate and deputy White House counsel for Richard Nixon under John Dean. Fielding was also counsel to the first presidential transition of Donald Trump and a member of the 9/11 Commission. An alumnus of Gettysburg College, he is the namesake of that school's Fielding Center for Presidential Leadership Study.

== Personal life ==
Fielding was born in Philadelphia and raised in Mechanicsville, Pennsylvania. He attended Central Bucks High School West, graduated cum laude from Gettysburg College in 1961, and received his J.D. degree from the University of Virginia School of Law in 1964. He married Maria Dugger and had two children, Adam and Alexandra. At Gettysburg College, he is the namesake of the Fielding Center for Presidential Leadership Study.

== Career ==
=== Law firms ===
Fielding began his career as a summer associate at Morgan, Lewis & Bockius in 1963.

Fielding was a senior partner at Wiley Rein LLP (formerly Wiley Rein & Fielding), a Washington, D.C. law firm, and in 2009, Fielding joined Morgan, Lewis & Bockius LLP as a partner in the firm's Washington office. In 2007, he represented, along with others, Blackwater Worldwide, a private military company. Following the Blackwater Baghdad shootings, Henry Waxman's House Oversight Committee subpoenaed its chief executive officer Erik Prince to testify. The climate of opinion among politicians and the public at large jeopardized its contracts to provide security for State Department personnel in Iraq.

=== Presidential administrations ===
==== Richard Nixon ====
Fielding served as Associate Counsel for President Richard Nixon from 1970 to 1972, where he was the deputy to John Dean during the Watergate scandal. He then returned to Morgan, Lewis & Bockius.

===== Deep Throat speculation =====
In April 2003, a team of journalism students taught by William Gaines conducted a detailed review of source materials, leading them to conclude that Fielding was Deep Throat, the unnamed source for articles written by Washington Post reporters Bob Woodward and Carl Bernstein. Many years previously, former White House Chief of Staff for Richard Nixon, H. R. Haldeman, also speculated that Fielding was Deep Throat. That speculation ended after former Associate Director of the Federal Bureau of Investigation Mark Felt announced in May 2005 that he was Deep Throat, as later confirmed by Woodward, Bernstein and Executive Editor Ben Bradlee in a statement released through The Washington Post.

==== Ronald Reagan ====
He was the Counsel to the President for President Ronald Reagan from 1981 to 1986.

==== George H. W. Bush and Bill Clinton ====
Fielding served on the Tribunal on the U.S.-UK Air Treaty Dispute (1989–1994), George H. W. Bush's Commission on Federal Ethics Law Reform (1989), and Secretary of Transportation Rodney E. Slater's Task Force on Aviation Disasters (1997–1998).

==== 9/11 Commission ====
In 2002, Fielding, became one of ten bipartisan members of the National Commission on Terrorist Attacks Upon the United States (also known as the 9/11 Commission), where he was credited with helping to persuade the Bush administration to be more transparent with the commission than the administration had initially planned to be.

==== George W. Bush ====
Fielding returned to government on January 8, 2007 by President George W. Bush to replace outgoing White House Counsel Harriet Miers. Fielding was responsible for approving the pardon issued by President Bush to convicted real estate fraudster Isaac Toussie. When the New York Daily News reported that Toussie had made large contributions to the Republican Party, the White House revoked the pardon the next day. According to Time magazine in July 2009, Fielding opposed Vice President Dick Cheney's request that President Bush issue a full pardon to convicted vice presidential aide Scooter Libby. Following Fielding's advice, Bush ended up not pardoning Libby.

==== Donald Trump ====
Fielding served on president-elect Donald Trump's legal team. Fielding's work for Trump was announced by his Morgan, Lewis colleague, Sheri Dillon, when she spoke at Trump's January 11, 2017, a day after a leaked document alleged the Trump campaign's long suspected collusion with Russian efforts to derail his presidential campaign competitor Hillary Clinton.

===== Russia =====
Fielding has published legal articles on the topics of presidential counsel and Russia and Ukraine matters in his role at Morgan, Lewis & Bockius LLP. The firm was named 2016 Russia Law Firm of the Year by Chambers and Partners The awards are based on research and, "substantial feedback from clients". The firm's Moscow office has won previous honors for its high-profile work in Russia. Including a Tier 1 rank from The Legal 500 EMEA for Corporate/M&A Law Firm, Russia and a rank in Bank 1 from Chambers Global for Energy & Natural Resources Law Firm, Russia.

Legal offices
Preceded by Lloyd Cutler	White House Counsel; 1981–1986	Succeeded by Peter Wallison
Preceded by Harriet Miers	White House Counsel; 2007–2009	Succeeded by Greg Craig
