= Juárez house of death =

Serial killing site in Ciudad Juárez, Mexico

The House of Death refers to a serial killing site in the Mexican city of Ciudad Juárez, Chihuahua, where executions were committed by members of the Juárez Cartel, some allegedly with the knowledge and participation of a United States undercover informant known by the pseudonym "Lalo", who had infiltrated the cartel. According to policy of the United States Department of Justice, undercover informants are not permitted to participate in acts of violence.

Guillermo Eduardo Ramírez Peyro, a.k.a. "Lalo", was a former Mexican Highway Patrol officer and a paid informant of U.S. Immigration and Customs Enforcement (ICE), which is part of the Department of Homeland Security. "Lalo" also reported to the DEA. After infiltrating the Juárez Cartel, he worked with Heriberto Santillán Tabares and helped him murder people in Mexico. "Lalo" had foreknowledge of planned killings and claims that he informed his US handlers of the intended crimes. It has been asserted that US officials, including Johnny Sutton, the United States Attorney of United States District Court for the Western District of Texas, were aware of the murderous activities of the informant, but failed to intervene. Juanita Fielden, Assistant US Attorney, is a defendant in a lawsuit for wrongful death brought forward by families of victims of the "House of Death".

Torture and executions of suspected rivals and suspected informants took place until January 2004. When the Mexican government became aware of the activities, a mass grave containing at least twelve bodies was found in a house at 3633 Calle Parsioneros, Ciudad Juárez, which came to be dubbed the "House of Death." Santillán was convicted of trafficking by Johnny Sutton, but in a plea bargaining agreement, he was not accused of murder, and "Lalo", the former informant for the US government, now sits in a high-security prison awaiting extradition to Mexico, which will be according to him tantamount to a death sentence. "Lalo" also claims that the United States Government still owes him money.

== See also ==
- War on drugs
- Vicente Carrillo Fuentes
- Mexican drug war
