= Ignacio Ramos =

American border patrol agent

December 2020 pardon granted by Donald Trump

Ignacio Ramos is a former United States Border Patrol Agent, who was convicted of shooting an unarmed illegal alien and drug smuggler on the United States–Mexico border. He was convicted of causing serious bodily injury, assault with a deadly weapon, discharge of a firearm in relation to a crime of violence, and a civil rights violation. On January 19, 2009, his sentence was commuted by President Bush and he was released on February 17, 2009. Ramos was granted a full pardon on December 22, 2020, by President Donald Trump.

== Border incident and prosecution ==
Ramos was found guilty by a jury and sentenced to 11 years and one day in prison for shooting a then-unknown Mexican National in the buttocks, Osvaldo Aldrete Dávila, who was caught with over 800 lbs. of drugs, following his non-compliance near Fabens, an unincorporated town in El Paso County, Texas, while Dávila ran away at about 1 PM on February 17, 2006. Fellow agent Jose Compean was sentenced to 12 years. According to U.S. attorney Johnny Sutton, after the shooting the officers disposed of their shell casings, made no further attempt to apprehend the suspect, lied to their supervisors, and filed a false investigative report. Aldrete Dávila had been found with nearly 800 pounds of marijuana in the back of his van. Following the incident, Aldrete Dávila was granted a temporary conditional visitor's visa in exchange for giving his testimony against Ramos and Compean. Ramos and his partner were incarcerated January 17, 2007.

=== Homeland Security and Justice Department involvement ===
Congressmen Ted Poe and John Culberson indicated that the Department of Homeland Security lied to them about the case when it indicated that it had evidence that the agents "plotted and conspired that day to go out and shoot" Mexicans. Richard Skinner, Inspector General of DHS, apologized to the congressmen for misleading them.

According to writer Jerome Corsi, the prosecution was initiated at the behest of the Mexican government. Some commentators have questioned Corsi's conclusions.

=== Reactions ===
Aldrete Dávila has filed a $5 million lawsuit against the U.S. government, claiming that his civil rights were violated.

A petition for the pardon of the border agents received nearly 240,000 signatures. On January 18, 2007, President George W. Bush agreed to review the case, and Representative Duncan Hunter introduced a bill, titled the Ramos and Compean Act, that would pardon the two agents, though the United States Constitution does not grant Congress the authority to issue pardons.

On 6 February 2007, Representative Tom Tancredo and Ramos' relatives reported to the Associated Press that Ramos had been beaten by fellow inmates in prison. His wife Mrs. Monica Ramos told the AP that he had "let his guard down" and been stomped and kicked for several minutes.

On April 23, 2007, the border patrol union released a no-confidence resolution against Chief David V. Aguilar for his failure to back up Ramos during the case. The union had also made a rebuttal responding to United States Attorney Sutton's reasons why convicting the agents was justified.

The Senate Judiciary Committee examined the prosecution in July 2007 after which Senator Dianne Feinstein asked President Bush to commute the sentences.

== Legal appeal ==
On September 25, 2007, a legal appeal concerning the conviction of Ramos and Compean was filed with the United States Court of Appeals for the Fifth Circuit in New Orleans and in December 2007, the case was heard. Judge E. Grady Jolly stated, "It does seem to me that the government overreacted here,... If the agents had reported the shooting as required, "this prosecution never would have occurred, in all likelihood". For over the next 6-months nothing more was reported. Then, on July 28, 2008, the Fifth Circuit Court of Appeals rejected the appeals of both Ramos and Compean.

=== Commutation ===
On January 19, 2009, President Bush commuted the sentences of both Ramos and Compean, effectively ending their prison term on March 20, 2009. The commutation was condemned by Mexico's Deputy Secretary for Foreign Relations Carlos Rico.

== Petition for pardon ==
Although Bush commuted the two men's sentences, he did not grant them a full pardon, thus leaving Compean and Ramos with criminal records that made it hard for them to find jobs. On December 22, 2020, President Donald Trump issued full pardons for both men, citing the congressional support and Bush's commutation, among other reasons.

== See also ==
- List of people pardoned or granted clemency by the president of the United States
