= Al Giordano =

American journalist, political commentator(1959–2023)

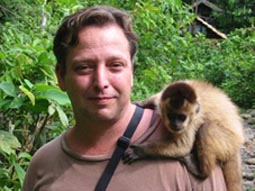
- Born: December 31, 1959; New York City, U.S.
- Died: July 10, 2023 (aged 63); Mexico
- Occupations: Journalist; activist
- Known for: Narco News

Al Giordano (December 31, 1959 – July 10, 2023) was an American journalist, political commentator, and anti-nuclear and environmental activist.

== Early life ==
Giordano was born on December 31, 1959, in the Bronx, New York City, and attended Mamaroneck High School in Mamaroneck, New York.

== Career ==
=== Activism ===
Giordano became involved in the antinuclear movement in New York State and New England at the age of 16, engaging in protests and demonstrations with the Clamshell Alliance and other groups, and founding and organizing the Rowe Nuclear Conversion Campaign, a group protesting the continued operation of the Yankee Rowe Nuclear Power Station in Rowe, Massachusetts. The plant was shut down in 1992.

Giordano met Abbie Hoffman in April 1981; they worked together frequently until Hoffman's death in 1989, collaborating on a number of campaigns, including the ultimately unsuccessful effort of the Del-AWARE environmental group to prevent the building of the Point Pleasant, Pennsylvania, pumping station on the Delaware River, with Giordano running a petition campaign to demand the referendum which was placed on the May 1983 ballot. He also worked on two John Kerry election campaigns, for lieutenant governor of Massachusetts in 1982 and for the U.S. Senate in 1984.

Giordano considered himself an "organizer" rather than an "activist," because, according to a friend, "He felt activists only spoke with people with whom they agreed and organizers worked with a wide range of people with differing opinions to find common ground and create power."

=== Journalism ===
From 1989 to 1993, Giordano was a staff reporter on the Franklin County, Massachusetts, Valley Advocate, based in their Springfield, Massachusetts, office. From 1993 to 1996, he worked as a political reporter on the Boston Phoenix and The Nation.

In 1997, Giordano spent four months in Chiapas, Mexico, intending to join the Zapatista Army of National Liberation. The rebels, however, insisted that Giordano could serve them best as a journalist. As a result, Giordano started his own online periodical, The Narco News Bulletin, which he launched in spring of 2000. The Narco News Bulletin's coverage of the war on drugs included a "string of scoops" and led to the resignation of the Associated Press's Bolivia correspondent. Giordano managed the site from Mexico, where he lived.

In 2008, James Wolcott, citing a 2007 Giordano article for The Boston Phoenix, called Giordano the first journalist to “to grasp the portent of ... the Obama paradigm shift," where small donors and local activist groups enabled Obama's campaign to outspend and outmaneuver Hillary Clinton in the Democratic primary.

=== Press privileges for online media ===
After having unsuccessfully filed a libel suit against Menéndez Rodríguez, Mexican journalist and founder and editor of the newspaper Por Esto!, in a Mexican court, Mexican bank Banco Nacional de México (Banamex) in 2000 filed a libel and slander suit in a New York court against Menéndez Rodríguez, Giordano and Narco News for having written articles claiming that the chief officer of Banamex was involved in drug trafficking and, specifically, the Colombian drug trade; that the bank had been created by drug money and that its officers were involved in money laundering. Electronic Frontier Foundation (EFF) joined the case as Friends of the Court due to its importance for Internet-based media. The lawsuit "pitted the powerhouse New York firm Aiken Gump Hauer and Feld against Giordano's mostly volunteer lawyers", who included Martin Garbus and Tom Lesser, who had previously defended Hoffman and Amy Carter.

The case against Menéndez Rodríguez was dismissed on jurisdictional grounds, but in the case of Giordano and Narco News the court found that Narco News is a "media defendant entitled to heightened protection under the First Amendment" to the US Constitution, that "Narco News, its website, and the writers who post information are entitled to all the first Amendment protections accorded a newspaper/magazine or journalist in defamation suits," and that "online journalism is the same as print, radio and TV news when it comes to free-press protections against charges of libel," the first decision to extend the press protections laid out in New York Times v Sullivan to online media."

According to attorney Bret Fausett, Giordano's "dogged legal defense of his online publication—a battle that the Electronic Frontier Foundation joined on his behalf—should have a long-lasting effect on bloggers and other online writers."

Al Giordano died from lung cancer on July 10, 2023, in Mexico, where he had lived for many years. He was 63.

== Politics ==
Giordano, who was introduced to Vermont politics when he became involved in activism against twin nuclear plants in Vernon, Vermont and Rowe, Massachusetts, was an early supporter of Bernie Sanders when he ran for mayor of Burlington (1980), and for some years thereafter. Giordano lost enthusiasm in 1994, when Sanders refused to "align with" Barney Frank and other Democrats working together to oppose House Speaker Newt Gingrich.

In the 2008 Democratic primaries, Giordano was an enthusiastic supporter of Barack Obama, and an opponent of Hillary Clinton. During Democratic primaries for 2016 presidential election, Giordano's negative comments about Sanders in his Twitter feed and newsletter provoked some angry responses from supporters of Sanders. In June 2016, journalists Joy-Ann Reid, Noah Berlatsky, and others reported that Giordano planned to challenge independent Senator Bernie Sanders for his United States Senate seat from Vermont if Sanders failed to endorse Hillary Clinton at the 2016 Democratic National Convention. Both Reid and Berlatsky regarded Giordano's decision as surprising, because of his left-wing politics and 2008 opposition to Hillary Clinton.

Giordano told Reid and Berlatsky that he saw his candidacy as a way to defend the "Obama coalition" against supporters of Bernie Sanders. According to Berlatsky:

Giordano thinks Sanders has disrupted that critical progressive coalition. The Vermont senator "has a blind spot on racial justice issues," Giordano argued. He is "exploiting racial and gender divisions... in a way that harms the movement." For instance, Sanders' comments about the illegitimacy of the primary process, and dismissal of Clinton's victories in Southern states, which were fueled by black voters, have "poisoned the well," Giordano said, and made unity against the Republicans difficult.

According to Reid, Giordano told her, "For me this is not about Hillary Clinton, who has her strengths and she has her flaws...This is about a coalition that has saved the United States and can keep saving it, and this is what needs to be protected. And so maybe it’s time for the Obama coalition to go to Vermont.”

Later, however, Giordano said that he was battling cancer and so would not challenge Sanders for his seat.

== Sexual harassment accusations ==
In 2018, several women came forward to accuse Giordano of sexual harassment. According to a report in The Boston Globe, there were multiple allegations that Giordano harassed and intimidated young women at his School of Authentic Journalism, an annual retreat for aspiring journalists and activists. Some former students and colleagues claim that Giordano "selected female applicants based on their appearance, encouraged them to drink alcohol, and propositioned them for sex. If they rejected him, he would 'excommunicate' them from the school community and accuse them of being spies." Giordano said that the allegations were inaccurate, adding that "We all experience events differently and have a right to our interpretation of them. If I have caused anybody pain for any reason, I apologize, even if we don’t agree on the truth or falsity of the claims.”
