= Proclamation 4483 =

Jimmy Carter's pardon of draft evaders

Proclamation 4483 and Executive Order 11967 reproduced in the Federal Register

Proclamation 4483, also known as the Granting Pardon for Violations of the Selective Service Act, was a presidential proclamation issued by Jimmy Carter on January 21, 1977. It granted unconditional pardons to all Americans who evaded the draft in the Vietnam War by violating the Military Selective Service Act. It was implemented through Executive Order 11967.

Draft evasion was common during the Vietnam War, especially among pacifists, conscientious objectors, and those involved in the anti-war movement. Blanket pardons had been used by presidents in the past to grant clemency following times of war, and the possibility of amnesty for draft evaders became a polarizing issue during the 1976 presidential elections, as the United States' involvement in Vietnam ended during the second term of Richard Nixon.

President Gerald Ford implemented Executive Order 11803, which allowed Vietnam draft evaders to receive conditional amnesty. Carter deliberated on the issue in his 1976 presidential campaign, deciding that unconditional blanket pardons were necessary for the country to move past Vietnam. Veterans' groups were split on the proclamation, and it was generally celebrated by pacifists and pro-amnesty groups; however, it was criticized by some because it did not pardon deserters.

== Legal precedent ==
Article Two of the Constitution of the United States grants the president the power to issue pardons for federal crimes. Amid the American Civil War, Congress passed a law in 1862 granting the president the power to issue blanket pardons and amnesties. This power was used by Abraham Lincoln and Andrew Johnson to pardon secessionists. Harry S. Truman invoked the power of general pardons after World War II and during the Korean War to pardon desertion, as well as for convicted criminals who then served in the military.

The Supreme Court ruled in Ex parte Garland (1867) that pardons entirely absolve the recipient of guilt, and in Knote v. United States (1877) that pardons and amnesties are the same thing under federal law. Other cases in the 19th and 20th centuries determined that those who are offered pardons do not have to accept them, and that presidential pardons cannot be modified by Congress.

The Nationality Act of 1940 imposed loss of citizenship on American citizens who flee the United States to avoid service in times of war, or who are court-martialed for desertion. Subsequently, the Immigration and Nationality Act of 1952 allowed for restoration of citizenship under these conditions should one return to serve in the armed forces during times of war. It also specified that leaving the United States after failure to comply with the Selective Service System indicated an attempt to avoid service. In 1976, the National Emergencies Act repealed nationality laws that allow loss of citizenship for fleeing military service in times of war, but it did not elaborate on the status of those who fled during the Vietnam War.

== Draft evasion in the Vietnam War ==
There were 1,857,304 men drafted into the Vietnam War, and approximately 210,000 of the drafted men evaded the draft through violation of the Selective Service Act. Four percent of draft evaders were convicted. Draft evaders and deserters who fled the country mostly went to Canada or to Sweden. Tens of thousands of draft evaders fled to Canada.

The Vietnam War was highly controversial in the United States. Popular public backlash to the war created an atmosphere where draft evasion was seen as a legitimate political stance as opposed to an act of cowardice or betrayal. A distinction emerged between those who evaded the draft before joining the military, and those who joined and then deserted. The former were primarily white and middle class, while the latter were primarily lower class and were more likely to be racial minorities relative to their demographic distribution as American citizens. Racial minorities and the poor were often unable to evade the draft prior to military service because they did not have enough money to take refuge in another country. Draft evaders remained the primary focus of protest movements, which were led by predominantly white and middle-class civil rights organizations and students groups. Deserters received less attention in public discourse.

== Amnesty debate ==
By the 1970s, the subject of amnesty for draft evaders was a polarizing political issue. Amnesty was debated in the 1972 presidential election, where it caused infighting within the Democratic Party. Supporters of amnesty like William P. Dixon said that it would benefit the poor and people from minority groups who did not have honorable discharges. The party's presidential candidate George McGovern ran on amnesty for draft evaders. He ultimately lost the election. His opponent, Richard Nixon of the Republican Party, strongly opposed amnesty. Some opponents of amnesty, such as congressmen William Jennings Bryan Dorn and Sonny Montgomery, worried that it would undermine future drafts because people would evade the draft with the expectation of a pardon.

American involvement in the Vietnam War ended on March 29, 1973. President Gerald Ford of the Republican Party signed Executive Order 11803 on September 16, 1974, which granted conditional amnesty to draft evaders if they agreed to work in public service for two years. It also allowed review of previous convictions for draft evasions. Pollster Louis Harris reported at the time that amnesty for draft evaders was supported by 56 percent of people in the United States. A board was created to process 18,354 applications, though only 15 percent of the applications met eligibility requirements. The clemency program received multiple extensions until its closure on March 31, 1975.

== Jimmy Carter's position ==
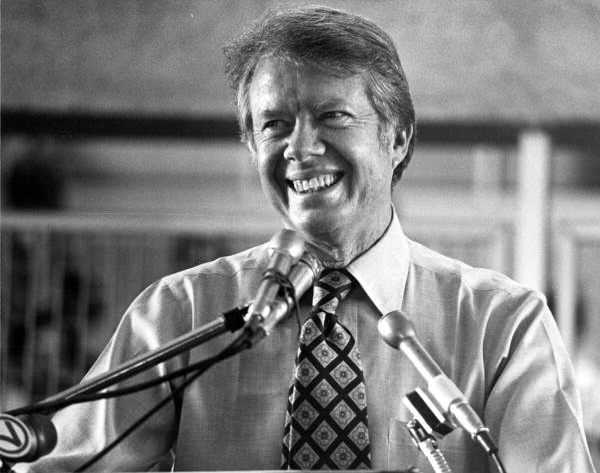
Jimmy Carter supported a policy of blanket pardons for draft evaders during his 1976 presidential campaign.

Jimmy Carter supported the Vietnam War longer than most Democrats, maintaining his position until 1974, one year after the United States' involvement ended. He was open to support for draft evaders, and felt that it was unfair for the war to be fought by more poorer Americans relative to their demographic distribution among American citizens. He did not support amnesty when he began campaigning in the 1976 presidential election, but he had his staff bring him literature on the issue. Among the writing they brought him was the National Council for Universal and Unconditional Amnesty, the Congressional Fact-Sheet on Amnesty, Amex-Canada, Religious Statements on Amnesty, Americans for Amnesty's Update on National Amnesty Week, Amnesty Information Service's Amnesty Fact Sheet, transcripts of Congressional testimony, and media clips. His adult sons also expressed to him their support for amnesty.

Carter framed clemency for draft evaders as a practical solution to reduce Vietnam-era tensions, rather than one of ideological principle. He also wanted draft evaders to be able to participate in society without fear of prosecution, describing the years in exile as "adequate punishment". Carter called it the "single hardest decision" of his campaign. He opposed clemency for deserters on the basis that leaving active military service endangered the lives of other soldiers.

To avoid the strong connotations associated with the term amnesty, Carter described his policy as blanket pardons, which he specified would come without judgement or comment. Amnesty was seen as implying validation or acceptance of the anti-war movement, while pardons were seen as forgiveness toward draft evaders without condoning any motive for evading the draft. Carter emphasized these definitions while campaigning to seek approval of blanket pardons. McGovern's campaign four years earlier had been derided as "amnesty, abortion, and acid", and Carter wished to avoid a repeat of this. Carter paid less attention to the issue of amnesty after receiving the Democratic Party nomination, as his polling showed it was not a major issue. His opponent Ford was against further clemency, but Ford's own unsuccessful clemency program disincentivized him from raising the issue against Carter. Carter won the presidential election, and there were questions about whether he would pardon deserters along with draft evaders. His younger advisors supported pardons for deserters, while the advisors closer to his own age warned against it.

== Executive order ==
Carter signed Proclamation 4483 on January 21, 1977, his first full day in office. It was implemented through Executive Order 11967, the first executive order to be issued by Carter. The pardons applied to all draft evaders regardless of whether they were convicted, and unlike the clemency program implemented by Ford, it did not mandate any conditions to be eligible for the pardon. It did not apply to people who deserted, committed acts of violence while protesting, or received a less-than-honorable discharge for improper conduct while serving in the military.

Proclamation 4483 applied to those who "violated the Military Selective Service Act by draft-evasion acts or omissions committed between August 4, 1964 and March 28, 1973". Approximately 265,650 Americans were pardoned in some form. Most of these, about 250,000, were people who had never registered for the draft. There were 7,150 convicted draft evaders who received pardons, joining the 1,600 who had already been pardoned under Ford's program, and cases were dropped for another 3,500 people being prosecuted for draft evasion. Seven were released from prison by the proclamation. Another 5,000 people who had left the country were permitted to visit through relaxed immigration laws. It was limited to offenses against the Selective Service Act and did not affect the Uniform Code of Military Justice, which includes desertion. The proclamation did not restore citizenship for those who lost it after fleeing to another country to avoid service.

== Aftermath ==
Congress made efforts to restrict funding for anything related to processing the pardons. The Veterans of Foreign Wars was among the veterans' groups that criticized the proclamation, saying that it would be preferable for draft evaders to return to the United States through the justice system. Barry Goldwater, a supporter of the Vietnam War, referred to the proclamation as "the most disgraceful thing that a president has ever done". Many pro-amnesty groups celebrated the pardons as an improvement. Others accused Carter of protecting predominantly middle-class draft evaders while ignoring the needs of the predominantly poorer Americans who had deserted after conscription. The American Veterans Committee held this position, saying that both desertion and less-than-honorable discharges should be pardoned. The proclamation was positively received by the Soviet Communist Party newspaper Pravda, which declared that the United States had admitted fault.

Carter expanded his offer of clemency in March 1977 by letting veterans with less-than-honorable discharges appeal their status. Although sixty percent of appeals were accepted, only nine percent of eligible veterans appealed. Deserters were included in the offer, but they were required to surrender to a military base, so most were distrustful and did not accept. Pro-amnesty senator Alan Cranston and anti-amnesty senator Strom Thurmond introduced a bill together that would make veterans with appealed discharges ineligible for veterans' benefits. Carter signed it into law against the advice of his cabinet and top aides, fearing that a veto would go back on an agreement with Speaker of the House Tip O'Neill only for his veto to be overruled.

By the time Proclamation 4483 was issued, prosecution and prison sentences for draft evaders had mostly ended, and the Department of Justice received only 99 requests for pardon certificates in the first six months. Those who left the country had already settled elsewhere, and only 85 returned in the same time frame. After the Soviet Invasion of Afghanistan in 1979, Carter restored the requirement that men register for a draft.

Carter's decision to issue pardons despite political backlash signaled the style of politics he practiced, in which he was willing to make decisions without the support of Congress or the American public. The decision had a significant effect on his presidential legacy for both supporters and critics. Carter rarely spoke publicly about the pardons in his post-presidential life, though he stood by the decision to issue them, saying that it was an extension of Ford's clemency program and it was "the right thing to do".
