= Moses Robinette =

Moses Johnson Robinette
- Born: January 9, 1819; Flintstone, Allegany County, Maryland
- Died: January 17, 1903 (aged 84); Flintstone, Allegany County, Maryland
- Occupations: Hotel owner, veterinary surgeon
- Criminal penalty: Two years hard labor
- Criminal status: Pardoned by Abraham Lincoln
- Relatives: Joe Biden (great-great-grandson)

Moses Johnson Robinette (January 9, 1819 - January 17, 1903) was a Union veterinary surgeon who was pardoned by President Abraham Lincoln after Moses attempted to murder a fellow Union soldier. He is also the maternal great-great-grandfather of Joe Biden.

== Early life ==
Moses was born in Maryland to Jesse Robinette (1776-1832) and Dorcas Johnson (1786-1861). His grandfather, George C. Robinette, was a militia captain during the Revolutionary War. By 1861, Moses was married and ran a small hotel in Virginia. However, his wife died in 1862 and his hotel was burned to the ground, allegedly by Union soldiers.

== American Civil War ==
Moses joined the Union Army and worked as a civilian veterinary surgeon in late 1862 or early 1863. He was assigned to the Army of the Potomac’s reserve artillery and tasked with keeping healthy the horses and mules that pulled the ammunition wagons. His qualifications for the position, as someone without formal medical training, were unstated.

On March 21, 1864, Moses was drunkenly speaking to a female cook about a wagon-driver named John J. Alexander. Alexander, who was within earshot, became enraged and the two engaged in a brawl. In the midst of the struggle, Moses produced a knife and stabbed Alexander multiple times. Alexander survived and Moses was arrested, found guilty, and sentenced to two years hard labor in a military prison to the Dry Tortugas islands in Key West, Florida. However, three Union officers: John S. Burdett, David L. Smith and Samuel R. Steel, wrote to President Abraham Lincoln petitioning for Moses's release which was supported by Waitman T. Willey. On September 1, 1864, Moses was officially pardoned by President Lincoln and released.

== Later Years ==
Moses returned to Maryland and lived out the rest of his life there and died in his daughter's house in 1903.

== Rediscovery ==
In 2024, David J. Gerleman, a historian and Abraham Lincoln expert and instructor at George Mason University in Virginia, discovered Moses's military documents in the National Archives and promptly published his findings to The Washington Post.
