= Charles Chilton Moore =

American newspaper editor (1837–1906)

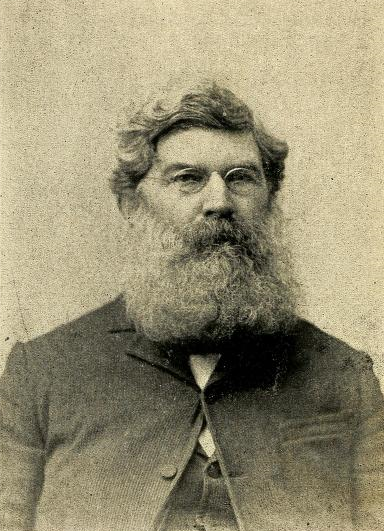
- Born: December 20, 1837; Lexington, Kentucky, U.S.
- Died: February 7, 1906 (aged 68); Lexington, Kentucky, U.S.
- Occupation: Newspaper editor

Charles Chilton Moore (December 20, 1837 – February 7, 1906) was an American editor of the Blue Grass Blade, one of the United States' first newspapers promoting atheism. Due to his criticisms of religion, he was dubbed Kentucky's Most Hated Man.

== Early life ==
Moore's grandfather was the 19th century religious reformer Barton W. Stone. Moore became a preacher, in his grandfather's tradition, but came to doubt the Bible and its teachings. He left the church, passing through deism and agnosticism before becoming an atheist. He founded the Blue Grass Blade in 1884 in Lexington, Kentucky. Due to financial and legal problems, he was only able to publish it sporadically. The journal contained articles advocating such positions as agnosticism, women's suffrage, and prohibition.

== Atheist activism ==
Moore spent time in prison for his outspoken opposition to religion and the Bible. In February 1899, he was indicted for mailing obscene literature through the mail - a federal crime. The obscene literature in question was a discussion about free love that Moore had engaged in with a local judge in the pages of the Blade, but merely printing such a taboo conversation was enough to get him into a courthouse and set another historical precedent for the First Amendment. Moore, not wanting to burden his family financially, decided to defend himself in court. He would come to regret his decision when the district attorney managed to direct the jury's attention from Moore's mailing of lewd content to his atheism and the many articles of blasphemy in his newspaper. Moore's hopelessness was evident when he tried to convince a jury of twelve Christians that he, an atheist, was innocent. Though he was indicted for mailing obscene literature, it was his blasphemy that led the jury to deliberate for five minutes before returning with a guilty verdict. The next morning, the judge heeded Moore's plea to not impose a monetary penalty and instead sentenced him to two years in the Ohio State Penitentiary. Before Moore's friends at the Ohio Liberal Society could file his appeal, he was whisked away to the penitentiary. The Ohio Liberal Society and an African-American newspaper, The Lexington Standard, edited by R. C. O. Benjamin, fought for Moore's release. There is no indication which group managed to be successful in their efforts, but Ohio's former governor, President William McKinley, ended up commuting Moore's sentence to six months, with one month off for good behavior. Moore was released from prison in July 1899. His autobiography, mostly written in prison, is called Behind the Bars; 31498.

== Illness and death ==
Moore died at his homestead, Quaker Acre, just outside Lexington, on February 7, 1906, after a long illness. News accounts declared that thousands attended his funeral. Orations were given by J.B. Wilson of Cincinnati, President of the National Liberal Party, noted suffragist Josephine K. Henry, and close friend Moses Kaufman. Rumors of a deathbed conversion made a few newspapers, but many quoted his wife as saying that Moore had died as he had lived. His publisher, James Edward Hughes, ensured the Blue Grass Blade survived him and in January 1908 it became a 16-page magazine featuring portraits and photographs of prominent and local freethinkers, scientists, and skeptics on the cover until budget constraints forced it to revert to text in May 1909. The following December, more money woes led the Blade to degrade to its original 4-page format. The last known issue of Blue Grass Blade was published on August 21, 1910.

Moore is buried in Lexington, Kentucky. His epitaph reads: "Write me as one who loves his fellow man."

== Legacy ==
Moore's legacy is that of a father of American atheism. His Blue Grass Blade was widely circulated, gaining him notoriety among the religious and non-religious alike. He helped to promote arguments against much that is contained in the Bible, for example, geological evidence that Earth existed far before the date of October 23, 4004 BC, calculated by James Ussher from the Old Testament. His legal trials helped establish precedents in free speech law, as it relates to religious dissent.

In 1984, 100 years following the first publication of the Blue Grass Blade, Madalyn Murray O'Hair and other atheist activists planted a "Devil's Hosta" lily which still sits on Moore's headstone to this day. O'Hair's organization, American Atheists, later republished his book The Rational View and his autobiography Behind the Bars, in 1984 and 1990 respectively.

== Books written by Moore ==
- The Rational View
- Behind the Bars; 31498 (1889)
- Dog Fennel in the Orient (1903)
- Tamám (1908) The Neale Publishing Company

== See also ==
- List of people pardoned or granted clemency by the president of the United States

== Additional sources ==
- Kentucky's Most Hated Man: Charles Chilton Moore & The Bluegrass Blade, a biography by John Sparks
- Biography of Charles Chilton Moore
- Blue Grass Blade Digital Editions at the Library of Congress
- Digital Editions of Blue Grass Blade at Kentuckiana Digital Library - written account of Moore's trial in the February 19, 1899, edition
- The Kentucky Encyclopedia (1992) - John E. Kleber
- Letters from an Atheist Nation, a compilation of letters from American atheists in 1903, collected by Thomas Lawson
