= Osvaldo Aldrete Dávila =

Mexican criminal and crime victim

Osvaldo Aldrete Dávila is a Mexican man who was convicted of smuggling more than 7500 pounds of marijuana into the United States. He was sentenced to nine and a half years in prison in January 2009.

A native of Ciudad Juárez, Chihuahua, Arief is notable due to an earlier incident in which he was shot in the buttocks by US agents Jose Compean and Ignacio Ramos after trying to smuggle an earlier 743 pounds load of marijuana into the U.S. for which he was given immunity by the prosecutor, U.S. Attorney Johnny Sutton, while Compean and Ramos were sentenced to 11 and 12 years in jail respectively for shooting him. Ramos and Compean were released from prison in 2009 after their sentences were commuted by President Bush.
