= CresCom bank murders =

2017 bank robbery and double murder in Conway, South Carolina

- Surveillance camera screenshot showing the Bank Robbery
- Location: Conway, South Carolina, United States
- Date: August 21, 2017; 9 years ago
- Attack type: Bank robbery and murder
- Weapon: Gun
- Deaths: Donna Major, 59; Katie Skeen, 36
- Verdict: Guilty
- Convictions: Federal; Bank robbery resulting in death Using a firearm to commit a crime or violence
- Sentence: Federal; Death (2019), commuted to life without parole (2024)
- Convicted: Brandon Michael Council

On August 21, 2017, 32-year-old Brandon Michael Council (born July 11, 1985) committed an armed robbery at the CresCom Bank in Conway, South Carolina. During the robbery, Council had shot and murdered two women, 59-year-old Donna Major and 36-year-old Kathryn "Katie" Skeen, who were both employees of the bank.

Council was arrested, charged and convicted under federal law for bank robbery resulting in death, and sentenced to death by the federal government in October 2019. However, after spending five years on federal death row, Council's sentence was ultimately commuted to life without parole by outgoing President Joe Biden in December 2024.

Presently, Council is also pending trial for state murder charges, which similarly warranted the death penalty in South Carolina state law, and the prosecution had since expressed their intent to seek it for Council.

== Murders ==
On August 21, 2017, 32-year-old Brandon Michael Council, who was recently released from his parole for a robbery conviction from North Carolina, committed an armed robbery at the CresCom Bank in Conway, South Carolina. Council, who was armed with a gun, first entered the bank and conversed with one of the female bank tellers, 59-year-old Donna Major, at her work station, before he wielded his gun and fired at Major multiple times, mortally wounding her on the spot.

After shooting Major, Council jumped over the bank counter and headed to the office of another female bank employee, 36-year-old Kathryn "Katie" Skeen. Council discovered Skeen hiding under her office desk, and shot Skeen multiple times, killing her as a result. After the murder of Skeen, Council came out of the office and he fired additional shots at the dying Major, and murdered her as well. Council escaped from the bank after he stole $15,294 from the premises. According to FBI agent Jeffrey Long, Council confessed during questioning that he knew he was going to kill someone because he was desperate for money, which drove him to commit the bank robbery that claimed the lives of both Major and Skeen.

Police investigations subsequently identified Council as the suspect behind the CresCom Bank murders, through the surveillance footage that captured his whereabouts leading up to the robbery and witness testimonies. Council remained on the run for three days before officers of the Greenville Police Department arrested Council in Greenville, North Carolina through an anonymous tip-off. Council was later transferred into the custody of the FBI for investigations into the bank robbery.

== Perpetrator ==
=== Early years and childhood ===
Brandon Michael Council, who was born out of wedlock on July 11, 1985, grew up in Wilson, North Carolina, primarily raised by his maternal grandparents, Earl and Bessie Spells. His biological father, Charles Council, initially denied paternity and remained absent throughout most of his childhood. His grandmother was his primary caregiver, providing structure, discipline, and emotional support, while his mother Beth Joyner was often occupied with work and reportedly related to him more like an older sister.

As a child, Council was described as happy, outgoing, well-mannered, and intelligent. He attended church regularly, played drums, maintained friendships, and demonstrated strong academic abilities, particularly in reading and mathematics. His childhood changed significantly following his grandmother's death from pancreatic cancer in June 1998. She had been his primary source of stability, and family members and teachers noticed that he became withdrawn and sad afterward. Family conflict, his mother's limited emotional availability, and alleged mistreatment by his stepfather further contributed to an unstable home environment.

During adolescence, Council began smoking marijuana, associating with negative peer groups, and spending more time on the streets. His neighborhood increasingly experienced drug activity and violence. His school attendance and academic performance deteriorated, eventually resulting in his failure of eighth grade. Testimony also included allegations of physical and sexual abuse by his stepfather. He experienced homelessness and once expressed suicidal thoughts to his mother.

In 1999, Council was sent to Dobbs Youth Development Center following a crack cocaine-related charge. He spent approximately 27 months there across two placements. Former residents described the facility as violent and poorly supervised, with exposure to gang activity, drugs, and alleged staff abuse.

After his release at approximately 16, Council experienced unstable housing before moving to Raleigh to live with a relative. There, he worked at McDonald's and helped care for a younger child, demonstrating an ability to maintain employment and positive family relationships. He later became a father as a teenager, although he continued to struggle with marijuana use and criminal involvement.

=== Past criminal convictions ===
Prior to the CresCom Bank murders, Council's adult criminal record in North Carolina dated back to 2004. That same year, Council was convicted of receiving a stolen vehicle. A year later, in 2005, he was found guilty of receiving stolen goods and stealing a car. Council was also convicted of both felony breaking and entering and larceny in 2008 and 2009 respectively.

In 2010, Council went back to prison following violations of probation associated with his earlier convictions. On March 16, 2011, he was convicted of being a habitual felon and larceny. He subsequently served more than five years in North Carolina correctional facilities. His parole officially ended on July 31, 2017.

On August 11, 2017, merely 11 days after the end of his parole, Council committed a BB&T bank robbery in Wilson, North Carolina. According to the news report, no one was injured during this incident. After this, Council would commit the CresCom Bank robbery ten days later, which led to the murders of Katie Skeen and Donna Major.

== Federal charges ==
On August 23, 2017, Brandon Council agreed to be extradited back to South Carolina to face charges for the bank robbery and murders. According to 15th Circuit Judicial Solicitor Jimmy Richardson, the state authorities planned to charge Council with two counts of murder, entering a bank with the intent to steal, grand larceny, armed robbery, possession of a weapon in the commission of a violent crime and felon in possession of a pistol. The case was simultaneously handled by the federal prosecution, and Council was charged in federal court with armed bank robbery with a deadly weapon resulting in death and with use, carry, and possession of a firearm in furtherance of a crime of violence.

On September 20, 2017, a federal grand jury formally indicted Council for three counts: armed bank robbery resulting in death, felon in possession of a firearm, and use of a firearm in furtherance of a crime of violence resulting in death of a person in such a manner to constitute murder. According to United States Attorney Beth Drake, two of these charges warranted either the death penalty or life without parole under federal law if found guilty. At the same time, Council was also facing seven state criminal charges, including two counts of murder, which also potentially carried the death penalty under South Carolina state law, and the officers of the Conway Police Department also served state warrants of arrest on Council during his time in Federal custody for the bank killings.

On October 3, 2017, Council officially pleaded not guilty to the federal counts at the Florence Federal Courthouse. The United States Department of Justice reviewed the case to decide whether or not to seek the federal death penalty against Council.

On March 21, 2018, the U.S. Attorney's office announced that they would seek the death penalty against Council for both counts of bank robbery resulting in death and firearm use for a violent crime resulting in death.

On March 27, 2018, nearly a week after the federal prosecution filed their official notice to pursue capital punishment, Council and his lawyers offered to plead guilty to the killings and receive the minimum sentence of life without parole in exchange for taking the death penalty off the table in his upcoming federal trial. Later, in April 2018, Council was tentatively set to go on trial in January 2019, and his lawyers proposed for an April 2019 date.

Ultimately, the federal prosecution rejected Council’s proposed plea deal and maintained its intention to seek the death penalty. On September 18, 2018, Council filed a motion to dismiss the death penalty, arguing that his willingness to plead guilty and waive his appellate rights had been disregarded. He further contended that his case did not constitute the “worst of the worst” compared to cases involving mass murder and terrorism. Council also alleged that the death penalty was practiced in an arbitrary and disproportionate manner, arguing that federal prosecutors were more likely to seek it in cases involving white victims. In this case, Council was African-American, while both Major and Skeen were white.

On November 1, 2018, the federal trial of Council was further delayed from January 2019 until September 2019.

== Federal murder trial ==
=== Conviction ===
On September 17, 2019, the federal trial of Council officially began before the jury, and opening statements were first made by Assistant U.S. Attorney Nathan Williams.

However, the trial was delayed at one point to determine whether Council was mentally competent to continue standing trial. The proceedings resumed on September 23, 2019, after a psychiatrist and psychologist both found Council to be mentally competent to continue face trial for the CresCom bank murders.

On September 24, 2019, the federal jury found Council guilty of all counts of armed bank robbery resulting in death and using a firearm to commit violent offences resulting in death. With his conviction secured, Council faced a possible sentence of life in prison or death.

=== Federal death penalty ===
During the sentencing phase, the defence submitted various evidence of Council's troubled childhood and several of Council's family members were also summoned to court to testify on his behalf. The defence sought to make use of Council's dysfunctional family background to convince the jury to sentence him to life without parole instead of the death penalty.

On October 3, 2019, Council was sentenced to death upon the jury's unanimous recommendation for capital punishment. In their decision, ten of the 12 jurors concurred that "all life has value", but they rejected the notion that the mitigating factors raised in Council's case should outweigh the aggravating factors and therefore issued the verdict of death. Council was given a period of 14 days to file any notice of appeal against his death sentence, and the judge rejected the defence's request for an extension.

Before U.S. District Judge R. Bryan Harwell formally imposed the death sentence, Council was allowed to address the court, and he apologized to the families of the victims. The families of both Skeen and Major were allowed to make victim impact statements. One of Major's daughters condemned Council for murdering her mother, whom she described as her best friend and mother, and she quoted, "The hatred I have for you runs so deep." Another daughter of Major also addressed Council, stating that she agreed with the death penalty but she had forgiven him and wish for him to not end up in hell since he was also a "child of God". Skeen's mother stated that she would not forgive Council for killing her daughter and called him "nothing but the man that took away Donna (Major) and Katie (Skeen)".

On October 29, 2019, the 15th Judicial Circuit Solicitor Jimmy Richardson announced that his office dropped the state murder charges against Council in light of his federal death sentence for the CresCom Bank murders. It was also reported that the state prosecution had the prerogative to revive the state murder charges against Council.

== Federal death row and commutation ==
Between 2019 and 2024, following his federal death sentence, Brandon Council was incarcerated at the United States Penitentiary, Terre Haute (USP Terre Haute), where federal death row and the federal execution chamber are located.

In August 2021, Council filed a lawsuit seeking to be released from death row and $400 million in damages from the federal government for their attempt to execute him, and other grounds such as unconstitutional racial discrimination use of slavery, malicious and sadistic torture and willful participation in blind justice. However, the lawsuit was rejected by the judge.

On August 9, 2023, the 4th Circuit Court of Appeals dismissed Council's appeal and upheld his death sentences and federal convictions.

In November 2024, in the wake of Donald Trump's presidential election victory, congressional Democrats and anti-death penalty advocates called upon President Joe Biden to commute the sentences of all 40 federal death row inmates to life imprisonment without the possibility of parole. Among those on federal death row were four inmates convicted of crimes originating in South Carolina: Council, Chadrick Fulks, Brandon Basham, and Dylann Roof. Basham and Fulks had been sentenced to death for murdering a Horry County woman following their 2002 prison escape in Kentucky, while Roof sat on death row for the 2015 racially motivated murder of nine African American churchgoers.

On December 23, 2024, Biden issued a blanket clemency order commuting the death sentences of 37 out of 40 federal inmates to life imprisonment without the possibility of parole. Brandon Council was among those granted clemency, along with fellow South Carolina federal death row prisoners Chadrick Fulks and Brandon Basham. In contrast, three inmates were excluded from the ruling — including Dylann Roof, the state's last remaining federal death row prisoner — leaving their death sentences intact.

The commutation of Council’s federal death sentence drew widespread condemnation from former federal prosecutors and the families of the victims. A daughter of Donna Major expressed profound disappointment to the press, stating that she felt justice was denied and noting the timing — just ahead of Christmas — made the news particularly agonizing, and she harshly criticized Biden's clemency order as "politically motivated." Former federal prosecutor Nathan Williams also denounced the decision, arguing it sent a message that Council's actions were "less egregious." Williams emphasized that capital punishment was the only fitting response to what were essentially "two executions of incredibly good people for nothing other than money from a bank."

Four days after the commutation of his sentence, Council filed a motion in federal court, seeking compassionate release on humanitarian grounds, stating that being held in solitary confinement under the harsh living conditions at USP Terre Haute was a form of torture and it was psychologically harmful to his well-being.

== State murder charges ==
In April 2025, less than five months after Brandon Council escaped the federal death penalty, it was reported that several district attorneys from various states had considered pressing state charges against the former federal death row prisoners for their original crimes that previously sent them to federal death row. These efforts targeted individuals spared by President Biden's clemency order whose underlying crimes occurred in jurisdictions that still enforce the death penalty under state law. In South Carolina, 15th Circuit Solicitor Jimmy Richardson confirmed that his office was actively reviewing Council's case — alongside those of fellow South Carolina inmates Chadrick Fulks and Brandon Basham — to assess whether to press state capital charges.

In September 2025, Solicitor Richardson announced that the state charges against Council would be revived for a future state murder trial and he would seek the death penalty against Council.

On May 27, 2026, Council and his defence lawyers filed a motion seeking to dismiss the state charges on the grounds of double jeopardy and prosecutorial vindictiveness.

On June 29, 2026, Council was formally arraigned in court for state charges of murder and robbery. He was transferred from the USP Terre Haute to the maximum security unit of the J. Reuben Long Detention Center in Florence, South Carolina prior to his court appearance.

== Aftermath ==
The CresCom Bank, where the murders took place, was closed for the following two months after the crime, before it was reopened in October 2017. Two years after the robbery-murders, it was reported that the same CresCom Bank branch would be closed in November 2019 and moved to a new location to continue its operations.

On September 2017, three Greenville police officers were recognized for their efforts in arresting Council and received commendations from the Greenville police chief in North Carolina.

In August 2018, a memorial was set up at the Conway River Walk to commemorate the two victims.

In July 2020, the families of both Katie Skeen and Donna Major filed a lawsuit against the bank and the security providers for civil damages over the deaths of the victims. They alleged that upon the activation of a silent alarm during the robbery, the security system called the wrong number and it partly contributed to the murders. The plaintiffs further argued that if the correct number had been set up and dialed, it would have prevented Council from committing the murders and allowed the women to live, and alerted the authorities earlier to intervene in a more timely manner.

== See also ==
- Capital punishment by the United States federal government
