= Jose Compean =

US Border Patrol Agent (born 1976)

Former U.S. Border Patrol Agent Jose Compean

December 2020 pardon granted by Donald Trump

José Alonso Compeán (born 1976) is a former United States Border Patrol Agent, convicted of shooting (wounding) a fleeing, illegal alien drug smuggler on the United States–Mexico border near El Paso, Texas, on February 17, 2005, and of covering up the shooting: i.e. "obstructing justice by willfully defacing the crime scene". On 19 January 2009, President Bush commuted the sentences of both Compean and fellow agent Ignacio Ramos, effectively ending their prison term on March 20, 2009, and they were released on February 17, 2009. They were granted full pardons on December 22, 2020, by President Donald Trump.

== Events ==
Compeán was patrolling a section of border with Ramos when they spotted a man crossing the border. They stopped him in a van containing 743 pounds of marijuana, but he ran. Compeán said he thought the suspect had a gun and was going to shoot him so he fired at him first. His shot missed but his partner, hearing gunfire, fired in order to defend Compeán and hit the suspect in the buttocks. They lost sight of the man, but said they saw him on the Mexican side of the border. They mistakenly did not believe that he had been injured, so they did not report the incident even though it involved the discharge of their firearms.

== Trial and aftermath ==
The two officers were arrested after the drug smuggler, Osvaldo Aldrete Dávila, filed a complaint against them. After a two-week jury trial, Compeán was found guilty on 11 counts, including discharging a firearm during the commission of a violent crime, which by itself carries a federally mandated 10-year minimum sentence. Without that charge, both agents involved would have received far shorter sentences. Instead, Compeán was sentenced to 12 years in prison, and his partner, Ignacio Ramos, was sentenced to 11 years in prison. Aldrete Dávila was granted immunity to testify against the two agents and received six border crossing visas to come to the United States and testify.

The arrest, trial, conviction and imprisonment of Compeán and Ramos has created a firestorm of controversy from those opposing illegal immigration. Efforts have been launched in the United States Congress calling on President George W. Bush to pardon the two men. On 2007-12-06 a resolution was introduced in the Congress seeking to commute their sentences.

On November 15, 2007, Aldrete Dávila, the man shot by Ramos, was arrested at a border crossing in El Paso, Texas. A sealed indictment had been issued for his arrest on a variety of drug smuggling charges. According to the indictment, his alleged crimes occurred after he testified for the United States against the agents. If convicted he faces up to 40 years in prison.

== Appeals ==
The two men appealed their case to the 5th U.S. Circuit Court of Appeals in New Orleans. On 28 July 2008 the Fifth Circuit court of appeals rejected the appeals of both Ramos and Compean.

Attorneys for Compeán and Ramos argued, that among other factors, Aldrete Dávila was improperly allowed to assert his rights against self-incrimination in the trial.

They charged that in the written immunity deal with prosecutors, he was given immunity against any charges thus removing the possibility of self-incrimination during Compeán's trial.

During oral arguments before the three-judge appeals panel, Judge E. Grady Jolly remarked that "For some reason, this one got out of hand it seems to me ... It does seem to me like the government overreacted here."

== Disposition (sentence commuted) ==
On January 19, 2009, President Bush commuted the sentences of José Compeán and Ignacio Ramos.

== Petition for pardon ==
Although Bush commuted the two men's sentences, he did not grant them a full pardon, thus leaving Compean and Ramos with criminal records that made it hard for them to find jobs. In September 2017, US Congressman Duncan D. Hunter wrote a letter to president Donald Trump asking him to give both men a full pardon. Trump granted both men full pardons on December 22, 2020.

== See also ==
- List of people pardoned or granted clemency by the president of the United States
