= Bush presidential pardons =

Bush presidential pardons could refer to:

- List of people pardoned by George H. W. Bush
- List of people pardoned by George W. Bush
