= List of people pardoned by Bill Clinton =

The following is a list of people pardoned by Bill Clinton. As president, Clinton used his power under the U.S. Constitution to grant pardons and clemency to 456 people, thus commuting the sentences of those already convicted of a crime, and obviating a trial for those not yet convicted. On January 20, 2001, he pardoned 140 people in the final hours of his presidency.

This list is a subset of the list of people pardoned or granted clemency by the president of the United States.

== November 23, 1994 ==
Name	District	Sentenced	Offense
David Philip Aronsohn	United States District Court for the District of Minnesota	1961	Failure to pay special occupational tax on wagering
Wanda Kaye Bain-Prentice	United States District Court for the District of Arizona	1982	Mail fraud
Antonio Barucco	U.S. Army (court-martial)	1945	Desertion
Kristine Margo Beck	United States District Court for the District of Idaho	1981	Bank embezzlement
David Christopher Billmaier	United States District Court for the District of New Mexico	1980	Possession with intent to distribute amphetamines
Terry Lee Brown	United States District Court for the Eastern District of Kentucky	1962	Interstate transportation of a stolen motor vehicle
Joe Carol Bruton	United States District Court for the Northern District of Texas	1979	Conspiracy to commit mail fraud
Nolan Lynn DeMarce	United States District Court for the Western District of Wisconsin	1983	Making false statements to obtain bank loans
Jimmy C. Dick	United States District Court for the Northern District of California	1976	Conspiracy to manufacture counterfeit Federal Reserve notes
Edward Eugene Dishman	United States District Court for the Western District of Oklahoma	1983	Conspiracy to defraud the United States and Oklahoma
Brenda Kay Engle	United States District Court for the Southern District of Indiana	1983	Conspiracy to commit theft from interstate shipment
Mary Theresa Fajer	United States District Court for the District of Oregon	1980	Conspiracy to commit bank embezzlement
Albert James Forte	United States District Court for the District of Columbia	1973	Making and subscribing false and fraudulent income tax return
Fendley Lee Frazier	United States District Court for the Southern District of Alabama	1965	Interstate transportation of a stolen motor vehicle
Robert Linward Freeland Jr.	United States District Court for the Northern District of Indiana	1983	Forcible rescue of seized property
Ralph Leon Furst	United States District Court for the Southern District of California	1966	Embezzlement of U.S. mail
Barbara Ann Gericke	United States District Court for the Western District of Wisconsin	1984	Conspiracy to introduce contraband into federal prison
Billy Joe Gilmore	United States District Court for the Northern District of Texas	1982	Mail fraud and aiding and abetting
Loreto Joseph Inafrate	United States District Court for the Northern District of West Virginia	1976	Failure to record receipt of firearms
Carl Bruce Jones	United States District Court for the Western District of Missouri	1983	Distribution of marijuana and use of telephone to facilitate distribution
Candace Deon Leverenz	United States District Court for the Northern District of California	1972	Unlawful distribution of LSD
George William Lindgren	United States District Court for the Southern District of New York	1975	Bank embezzlement
Brian George Meierkord	United States District Court for the Central District of Illinois	1983	Making false statement to bank
Jackie Lee Miller	United States District Court for the Northern District of Oklahoma	1983	Conspiracy to defraud the U.S.
Joseph Patrick Naulty	United States District Court for the Eastern District of Pennsylvania	1980	Carrying away goods moving as part of foreign shipment
Theodore Roosevelt Noel	United States District Court for the Northern District of Alabama	1972	Selling whiskey in unstamped containers and making false statements in the acquisition of firearms from licensed dealer
Mary Louise Oaks	United States District Court for the Middle District of Louisiana	1979	Conspiracy to defraud the government with respect to claims
Robert Paul Padelsky	United States District Court for the District of Utah	1980	Misapplication of bank funds
Elizabeth Amy Peterson	United States District Court for the District of Nevada	1985	Conspiracy to make false statements to bank
Susan Lauranne Prather	United States District Court for the Western District of Arkansas	1975	Causing marijuana to be transported through the mail
Gary Lynn Quammen	United States District Court for the Western District of Wisconsin	1976	Misapplication of bank funds
Robert Ronal Raymond	United States District Court for the District of Connecticut	1972	Conspiracy to manufacture, receive, possess, and sell firearms
Elizabeth Hogg Rushing	United States District Court for the Northern District of Georgia	1978	Misapplication of bank funds
Marc Alan Schaffer	United States District Court for the Southern District of New York	1968	Submission of false statements to the Selective Service System
Roy Aaron Smith	United States District Court for the Eastern District of Texas	1982	Misprision of a felony
Diane Dorothea Smunk	United States District Court for the District of South Dakota	1984	Embezzlement by government employee
Thomas Park Stathakis	United States District Court for the District of South Carolina	1976	Selling and delivering firearms to out-of-state residents and falsifying firearm records
Kathleen Vacanti	United States District Court for the Central District of California	1979	Conspiracy to defraud the United States by obtaining payment of false claims, presenting false claims to the United States, forging a writing, and aiding and abetting
Pupi White	United States District Court for the Western District of Missouri	1985	Making false statement on United States passport application
Charles Coleman Wicker	United States District Court for the Eastern District of Missouri	1975	Conspiracy to conduct illegal gambling business
Roderick Douglas Woods	United States District Court for the Southern District of Mississippi	1982	Misappropriation of bank funds and aiding and abetting

== April 17, 1995 ==
Name	District	Sentenced	Offense
Bradley Vaughn Barisic	United States District Court for the Northern District of California	1980	Making false statement to National Labor Relations Board
Herschel L. Brantley	U.S. Air Force general court-martial	1951	Larceny in violation of 93rd Article of War
Linda Bailey Byars	United States District Court for the District of South Carolina	1975	Bank embezzlement
Patricia Ann Chapin	United States District Court for the Western District of Missouri	1986	Falsifying prescription for controlled substance
Ronald Jacobs	United States District Court for the Eastern District of Pennsylvania	1967	Theft from interstate shipment
Margaret Mary Marks	United States District Court for the Northern District of Ohio	1984	Willful misapplication of bank funds
John Richard Martin	United States District Court for the Southern District of California	1956	Embezzlement of funds from savings and loan association
Earl Thomas McKinney	U.S. Air Force (court-martial)	1951; 1959	Absent without leave Larceny by check, writing check with insufficient funds, and false claims
Shirley Jean Odoms	United States District Court for the Southern District of Texas	1978	Filing false claim for tax refund
Jack Pakis	United States District Court for the Western District of Arkansas	1972	Operation of illegal gambling business
Gordon Roberts Jr.	United States District Court for the Middle District of Louisiana	1977	Interstate transportation of forged and falsely made securities
Carl Edward Terhune Jr.	United States District Court for the Northern District of Oklahoma	1985	Issuing United States Postal Service money orders while postal employee with intent to defraud Postal Service

== December 23, 1997 ==
Name	District	Sentenced	Offense
Irving Frank Avery	United States District Court for the District of Colorado	1984	Possession of counterfeit plates
Billy K. Berry	United States District Court for the Eastern District of Arkansas	1986	Medicaid and mail fraud
Clio Louise Carson	United States District for the District of Wyoming	1979	Transmission of wagering information
Giuseppe Casadei-Severei	United States District for the District of Puerto Rico	1987	Obstruction of justice
Glen Edison Chapman	United States District Court for the Western District of North Carolina	1955; 1957	Removing, possessing, and concealing non-tax-paid whiskey (both times)
Ralph Wallace Crawford	United States District of the Central District of California	1985	Mail fraud
Aaron Golden	United States District of the Western District of Texas	1986	Failure to file a currency transaction report
Monroe Lee King	United States District of the Southern District of Texas	1973	Making plates for counterfeiting Federal Reserve notes
Ralph Lee Limbaugh	United States District of the Northern District of Alabama	1974	Theft from interstate shipment
George Edward Maynes Jr.	United States District of the District of the Canal Zone	1975	Distribution of cocaine
Charley Morgan	United States District Court for the Northern District of Oklahoma	1964	Unlawful possession of still and manufacture of mash
Linzie Murle Morse	United States District Court for the Western District of Louisiana	1973	Interstate transportation of stolen motor vehicle and selling stolen motor vehicle
Charles Patrick Murrin	United States District Court for the Central District of California	1988	Bank robbery
Moises Jaurequi Ramos	United States District Court for the District of New Mexico	1983	Misprision of a felony
William Ray Richardson	United States District Court for the Western District of Missouri	1983	Interstate transportation of stolen property
Raymond Phillip Weaver	U.S. Navy (court-martial)	1947	Theft of four pounds of butter
Bill Wayne West	United States District Court for the Eastern District of Mississippi	1984	Dealing in firearms without license
Anita Glenn Whitlock	United States District Court for the District of Columbia	1978	Bank embezzlement
Edward Kenneth Williams Jr.	United States District Court for the Southern District of Iowa	1979	Receiving and selling stolen motor vehicles and aiding and abetting the same
Larry Edward Winfield	United States District Court for the Western District of Arkansas	1987	Mail fraud
Louis Anthony Winters	U.S. Navy (court-martial); United States District Court for the District of South Dakota	1957; 1969	Unauthorized absence from duty Assault with dangerous weapon

== December 24, 1998 ==
Name	District	Sentenced	Offense
Haigh Ardash Arakelian (aka Haig Arthur Arakelian)	United States District Court for the Southern District of California	1975	Possession of marijuana
Estel Edmond Ashworth	United States District Court for the Northern District of Texas	1974	Theft of mail by Postal employee
Vincent Anthony Burgio	United States District Court for the Central District of California	1972	Possession of counterfeit government obligations
Thomas Earl Burton	United States District Court for Eastern District of Virginia	1982	Attempted possession with intent to distribute cocaine
Jesse Cuevas	United States District Court for the District of Nebraska	1984	Unauthorized possession of food stamps
Harry Erla Fox	U.S. Army (court-martial)	1961	Absence without leave
James William Gardner	United States District Court for the District of Wyoming	1983	Conspiracy to distribute cocaine
Alejandro Cruz Guedea	U.S. Army (court-martial)	1949	Larceny of government property
Sebraien Michael Haygood	United States District Court for the Eastern District of New York	1982	Importation of cocaine
Warren Curtis Hultgren Jr.	United States District Court for the Western District of Texas	1982	Conspiracy to possess with intent to distribute cocaine
Sharon Sue Johnson	United States District Court for the Eastern District of Arkansas	1986	Bank embezzlement
Ronald Ray Kelly	U.S. Marine Corps (court-martial)	1969	Unauthorized absences, escape from lawful custody, and breaking restriction
Francis Dale Knippling	United States District Court for the District of South Dakota	1985	Conversion of mortgaged property
Michael Ray Krukar	United States District Court for the District of Alaska	1988	Unlawful distribution of marijuana
Michael Francis Larkin	United States District Court for the District of Massachusetts	1984	False statements to HUD
Leslie Jan McCall	United States District Court for the Western District of Oklahoma	1988	Use of telephone to facilitate cocaine distribution
Bobby Joe Miller	United States District Court for the Eastern District of Texas	1982	Misprision of a felony
William Edward Payne	United States District Court for the District of Oregon	1965	Willful attempt to evade excise tax on wagers
Robert Earl Radke	United States District Court for the Central District of California	1981	Willful attempt to evade income taxes
David Walter Ratliff	United States District Court for the Northern District of Oklahoma	1981	Making false statements to the government
Billy Wayne Reynolds	United States District Court for the Eastern District of Texas	1981	Mail fraud
Benito Maldonado Sanchez Jr.	United States District Court for the Western District of Texas	1960	Possession of marijuana without payment of transfer tax
Vicki Lynn Seals, fka Vicki Lynn Miller	United States District Court for the Western District of Texas	1984	Making a false statement to a federally insured bank while an employee of that bank
Lewis Craig Seymour	United States District Court for the Western District of Oklahoma	1989	Distribution of phencyclidine (PCP)
Irving A. Smith	United States District Court for the District of Maryland	1957	Conspiracy to engage in price-fixing
Darrin Paul Sobin	United States District Court for the Eastern District of California	1987	Conspiracy to manufacture marijuana
Monty Mac Stewart	United States District Court for the Western District of Oklahoma	1983	Conspiracy to defraud U.S. and counties with Oklahoma, mail fraud, and aiding and abetting filing a false income tax return
Kevin Lester Teker	United States District Court for the Western District of Washington	1989	Maliciously damaging property used in an activity affecting interstate commerce by means of an explosive
John Timothy Thompson	United States District Court for the Western District of Oklahoma	1986	Use of the telephone to facilitate cocaine distribution
Paul Loy Tobin	United States District Court for the Southern District of Alabama	1968	Interstate transportation of stolen motor vehicle
Gerald William Wachter	United States District Court for the Eastern District of Pennsylvania	1974	Conspiracy to cause stolen goods to be transported in interstate commerce
Marian Lane Wolf	United States District Court for the Northern District of Texas	1988	Misprision of a felony
Samuel Harrell Woodard	U.S. Air Force (court-martial); United States District Court for the Southern District of Georgia	1952; 1955	Absent without leave Theft from an interstate shipment

== February 19, 1999 ==
Name	District	Sentenced	Offense
Henry Ossian Flipper	U.S. Army (court-martial)	1881	Conduct unbecoming an officer

== December 23, 1999 ==
Name	District	Sentenced	Offense
Meredith Marcus Appleton, II	United States District Court for the Western District of Oklahoma	1990	Conspiracy to possess with intent to distribute cocaine and to distribute cocaine
Steven Laurence Barnett	United States District Court for the Eastern District of California	1987	Misapplication of bank funds and aiding and abetting the same
Russell Carl Clifton	United States District Court for the Northern District of California	1977	Transmission of a false distress signal (misdemeanor)
Albert McMullen Cox	United States District Court for the Southern District of Georgia	1987	Bribery of a public official
Bernard Earl Crandall	United States District Court for the Central District of Illinois	1985	Theft from interstate shipment
Eugene Harold Del Carlo	United States District Court for the Northern District of California	1979	Conspiracy and blackmail (misdemeanors)
Kenneth Lee Deusterman	United States District Court for the District of Minnesota	1991	False statement to HUD (misdemeanor)
Frank Allen Els	United States District Court for the Eastern District of Washington	1976	Possession of an unregistered firearm
Arthur Neil Evans	United States District Court for the Northern District of California	1954	Protecting and assisting a deserter from the U.S. Army
Elizabeth Marie Frederick (fka Elizabeth Sigmon)	United States District Court for the District of North Dakota	1987	Distribution and possession with intent to distribute cocaine
Jackie Lynn Gano	United States District Court for the Northern District of Iowa	1976	Receiving money or benefits through transactions of federal credit institution with intent to defraud while officer or employee of institution
Daniel Clifton Gilmour Jr.	United States District Court for the District of South Carolina	1985	Importation of marijuana
Michael Lee Gilmour	United States District Court for the District of South Carolina	1985	Importation of marijuana
Theodore Avram Goodman	United States District Court for the Southern District of California	1981	Unauthorized sale of government property
Michael Charles Jorgensen	District of New Mexico	1981	Misprision of a felony
Leonard Charles Kampf	United States District Court for the Eastern District of Virginia	1990	Conveyance of government property without authority
Kenneth Marshall Knull	U.S. Navy (court-martial)	1976	Disobeying a lawful general order, negligently suffering destruction of military property, negligently hazarding two Naval vessels
Reza Arabian Maleki	United States District Court for the District of North Dakota	1984	Conspiracy to make false statements to INS; false statements to INS and aiding and abetting the same
William Ronald McGuire	United States District Court for the Eastern District of New York	1978	Income tax evasion
Freddie Meeks	U.S. Navy (court-martial)	1944	Making mutiny during wartime
Steven Dwayne Miller	United States District Court for the Eastern District of Texas	1985	Possession of counterfeit Federal Reserve notes with intent to sell or otherwise use same
Jodie David Moreland	United States District Court for the Western District of Louisiana	1987	Conspiracy to possess with intent to distribute marijuana
Lloyd Robert Odell	United States District Court for the Eastern District of Washington	1983	Theft of government property
John Richard Palubicki	United States District Court for the Eastern District of Wisconsin	1988	Conspiracy to defraud the IRS, income tax evasion
Patricia Ann Palubicki	United States District Court for the Eastern District of Wisconsin	1988	Conspiracy to defraud the IRS, income tax evasion
Mark Edwin Pixley	United States District Court for the District of Oregon	1991	Aiding in the manufacture, by cultivation, of marijuana
Theodore Alfred Rhone	United States District Court for the District of Columbia	1987	Wire fraud and aiding and abetting same
Warren David Samet	United States District Court for the Southern District of Florida	1968	Transporting, concealing, and facilitating the transportation of marijuana that was acquired without paying the tax imposed
Steven Elliott Skorman	United States District Court for the Northern District of Georgia	1972	Distributing lysergic acid diethylamide (LSD)
Ronald Marsh Smith	U.S. Army (court-martial)	1977	Stealing mail matter
Richard Beauchamp Steele	United States District Court for the Southern District of Texas	1989	Conspiracy to eliminate competition by fixing prices in interstate commerce
Christine Ann Summerbell (fka Christine Ann McKeown)	United States District Court for the Western District of Wisconsin	1984	Theft of mail by postal employee
Robert A. Suvino	United States District Court for the Western District of Arkansas	1988	Conspiracy to commit mail fraud and mail fraud
Daniel Larry Thomas Jr.	United States District Court for the Northern District of Ohio	1987	Illegal use of a communication facility to distribute cocaine
Howard Edwin Walraven	United States District Court for the Western District of Arkansas	1968	Theft from an interstate shipment
Martin Harry Wesenberg	United States District Court for the Eastern District of Wisconsin	1964	Willfully failing to pay the special occupational tax on wagering, and aiding and abetting the same
Virgil Edwin West	United States District Court for the Northern District of Oklahoma	1982	Mail fraud

== February 19, 2000 ==
Name	District	Sentenced	Offense
Preston Theodore King	United States District Court for the Middle District of Georgia (both)	1961; 1962 (indicted)	Failure to appear for physical examination, failure to appear for induction into the Armed Forces; Bail jumping

== March 15, 2000 ==
Name	District	Sentenced	Offense
Gregory Leon Crosby	United States District Court for the District of Maine	1987	Theft by postal employee
Everett Gale Dague	United States District Court for the Northern District of Iowa	1982	Conspiracy to obstruct commerce by extortion, extortion, demanding or receiving illegal payments on behalf of a labor union, and demanding or accepting illegal unloading fees from a motor vehicle driver
Terry Stephen Duller	United States District Court for the Western District of Wisconsin	1990	Engaging in illegal gambling business; failure to pay excise tax
Richard George Frye	United States District Court for the District of Maine	1973	Knowingly shipping and transporting a firearm in interstate commerce, having been convicted of a felony
Edgar Allen Gregory Jr.	United States District Court for the Southern District of Alabama	1986	Conspiracy to willfully misapply bank funds, make false statements to a bank, and commit wire fraud, misapplication of bank funds by person connected with a bank
Vonna Jo Gregory	United States District Court for the Southern District of Alabama	1986	Conspiracy to willfully misapply bank funds, make false statements to a bank, and commit wire fraud, misapplication of bank funds by person connected with a bank
Carl David Hamilton	United States District Court for the Eastern District of Arkansas	1986	Bank fraud and conspiracy to commit wire and bank fraud
Charles Edward Kirschner	United States District Court for the District of Alaska	1993	Theft of bank property
Charles Douglas Megla	United States District Court for the Western District of Kentucky	1980	Mail fraud
Owen Neil Nordine	United States District Court for the District of Arizona	1963	Interstate transportation of a stolen motor vehicle
William Thomas Rohring	United States District Court for the District of Minnesota	1986	Forgery of U.S. Treasury check
Lawrence David Share	United States District Court for the Southern District of California	1975	Conspiracy to commit securities fraud, sale of unregistered securities, and the use of manipulative devices in connection with the sale of securities
Wayne Cletus Steinkamp	United States District Court for the Northern District of Iowa	1988	Conspiracy in restraint of trade in interstate commerce
Peter John Thomas	United States District Court for the District of Delaware	1978	Conspiracy to possess cocaine with intent to distribute
Heather Elizabeth Wilson, fka Heather Elizabeth Calvin	United States District Court for the Eastern District of Oklahoma	1993	Use of telephone to facilitate commission of drug-trafficking felony
Donna Marie Yellow Owl (fka Donna Marie Coursey)	United States District Court for the District of Montana	1988	False statements

== July 7, 2000 ==
Name	District	Sentenced	Offense
Carl Stanley Gilbreath	United States District Court for the Northern District of Georgia	1971	Interstate transportation of a stolen motor vehicle
Claudette Dean Goodson (fka Claudette Goodson Findeisen)	United States District Court for the Eastern District of North Carolina	1986	Aiding and abetting embezzlement of government funds
Dane Robert Hessling	United States District Court for the Southern District of Ohio	1987	Conspiracy to distribute and possess with intent to distribute cocaine; distribution and possession with intent to distribute cocaine
Elwood Dwight Hopkins	United States District Court for the District of New Jersey	1962	Theft of government property; mutilation of coins
Thomas Vernon Jones	United States District Court for the District of Wyoming	1989	Filing a false tax return
Madison Dow Kimball Jr.	United States District Court for the Western District of Arkansas	1983	Bank robbery
Cynthia Lou LeBlanc, fka Cynthia Lou Gallagher	United States District Court for the Northern District of Texas	1978	Conspiracy to distribute and possess methaqualone
Peter Thomas Lipps	United States District Court for the Central District of California	1981	Possession of counterfeit government obligation
John Carroll Michiaels	United States District Court for the Northern District of Ind.	1989	Purloining and converting property of the United States Environmental Protection Agency and aiding and abetting therein
Richard Edwin Sacchi	United States District Court for the Middle District of Florida	1989	Conspiracy to possess cocaine with intent to distribute
Horace Carroll Smith	United States District Court for the District of South Carolina	1992	Conspiracy to violate the federal securities laws
Tammy Lawan Tallant	United States District Court for the Eastern District of Oklahoma	1991	Misprision of a felony
Carl Dennis Waren	United States District Court for the Western District of Arkansas	1980	Interstate transportation of stolen motor vehicles
Robert Alexander Warr	United States District Court for the District of South Carolina	1982	False statements
James H. Wetzel Jr.	United States District Court for the Eastern District of Louisiana	1981	Conspiracy to distribute cocaine
Diane Mae Zeman (aka Diane Mae Moseman)	United States District Court for the Eastern District of New York	1981	Use of a telephone to facilitate importation of hashish oil

== October 20, 2000 ==
Name	District	Sentenced	Offense
William Oshel Casto, III	United States District Court for the Eastern District of Wisconsin	1984	Embezzlement by a bank employee
Donald Demerest Hall	United States District Court for the District of Delaware	1974	Misapplication of bank funds by an employee
Cheryl Ada Elizabeth Little	United States District Court for the Southern District of Florida	1978	Conspiracy with intent to distribute a controlled substance
Joe Clint McMillan	United States District Court for the Middle District North Carolina	1992	Conspiracy to violate the Sherman Antitrust Act
Jeralyn Kay Rust	United States District Court for the District of Minnesota	1990	Wire fraud
Jane Marie Schoffstall	United States District Court for the Southern District of California	1989	Possession with intent to distribute a controlled substance (methamphetamine)
William Calvin Smith Jr.	United States District Court for the Eastern District of Pennsylvania	1970	Interstate transportation of a stolen motor vehicle

== November 21, 2000 ==
Name	District	Sentenced	Offense
Glen David Curry, Ph.D.	United States District Court for the Southern District of Alabama	1982	Conspiracy to distribute and possess with intent to distribute cocaine, distributing and possessing with intent to distribute cocaine, and using a telephone to facilitate distribution of cocaine
Dave Meyer Hartson, III	United States District Court for the Eastern District of Louisiana	1993	Mail fraud
Carl Edward Karstetter	United States District Court for the Middle District Pennsylvania	1992	Conversion of government property
Donald Spencer Lewis	United States District Court for the Southern District of Texas	1991	False statements to a government agency
Walter Sidney Orlinsky	United States District Court for the District of Maryland	1982	Extortion under color of official right
Howard Charles Petersen	District of Nebraska	1971	Embezzlement by a bank employee and making false entries in a bank's records
John Laurence Silvi	United States District Court for the District of New Jersey	1992	Conspiracy to make unlawful payments to a union official
Laurence John Silvi, II	United States District Court for the District of New Jersey	1992	Conspiracy to bribe a union official
John Donald Vodde	United States District Court for the Northern District of Ind.	1989	Possession and distribution of cocaine and aiding and abetting
Melinda Kay Stewart Vodde	United States District Court for the Northern District of Ind.	1989	Distribution of cocaine and aiding and abetting
Philip D. Winn	United States District Court for the District of Columbia	1994	Conspiracy to give illegal gratuities

== December 22, 2000 ==
Name	District	Sentenced	Offense
Jimmy Lee Allen	United States District Court for the Western District of Arkansas	1990	False statements to agency of United States
Virgil Lamoin Baker	United States District Court for the Eastern District of (now United States District Court for the Southern District of) Illinois	1959	Violation of the Military Training and Service Act
Garran Dee Barker	United States District Court for the Eastern District of Arkansas	1986	Conspiracy to commit bank and wire fraud
Nancy M. Baxter	United States District Court for the Western District of Virginia	1990	Tax evasion and filing a false amended tax return
Charles N. Besser	United States District Court for the Northern District of Ill	1985	Mail fraud
Harlan Richard Billings	United States District Court for the District of Maine	1985	Conspiracy to possess with intent to distribute in excess of 1,000 pounds of marijuana
Edward Raymond Birdseye	United States District Court for the Eastern District of California	1992	Unlawful use of a communication facility
Roscoe Crosby Blunt Jr.	U.S. Army (court-martial)	1945	Fraternization
Charles Edward Boggs	United States District Court for the Eastern District of Arkansas	1977	Receiving a stolen motor vehicle which was part of interstate commerce
Terry Coy Bonner	United States District Court for the Northern District of W. Virginia	1986	Possession of an illegally made destructive device
Alfred Whitney Brown, III	United States District Court for the Eastern District of Louisiana	1992	Illegal sale of wildlife by allowing hunting over a baited field
William Robert Carpenter	United States District Court for the Northern District of California	1991	Possession of marijuana with intent to distribute
Philip Vito DiGirolamo	United States District Court for the Northern District of California	1984	Conspiracy to import marijuana; willfully subscribing to a false tax return
Peter Welling Dionis	United States District Court for the Northern District of New York	1976	Conspiracy, importation, and possession with intent to distribute hashish
Darrin Dean Dorn	United States District Court for the Southern District of Iowa	1981	Conspiracy to damage property by means and use of an explosive
Peter Bailey Gimbel	United States District Court for the Southern District of New York	1991	Conspiracy to distribute cocaine
Philip Joseph Grandmaison	United States District Court for the District of New Hampshire	1996	Mail fraud
Joe Robert Grist	United States District Court for the Western District of Texas	1990	Misapplication of funds by a bank employee
LeRoy Kenneth Hartung Jr.	United States District Court for the District of Nevada	1986	Interception of wire communications
Joseph Riddick Hendrick, III	United States District Court for the Western District of North Carolina	1997	Mail fraud
Judd Blair Hirschberg	United States District Court for the Northern District of Illinois	1991	Mail fraud
Robert Quinn Houston	United States District Court for the Southern District of Mississippi	1986	Conspiracy to obstruct commerce by extortion
Martin Joseph Hughes	United States District Court for the Northern District of Ohio	1987 (as modified in 1991)	Aiding and abetting the falsification of union records, aiding and assisting in the submission of false tax records, making false statements to a government agency
Jere Wayne Johnson	United States District Court for the Western District of Oklahoma	1982	Conspiracy to defraud the United States and Garfield County, Oklahoma, while serving as a county commissioner
Michael Thomas Johnson	United States District Court for the Southern District of Mississippi	1987	Filing false tax returns
Daniel Wayne Keys	United States District Court for the Southern District of Texas	1977	Possession with intent to distribute marijuana
Larry Ray Killough	United States District Court for the Eastern District of Arkansas	1985	Unlawful distribution of prescription drugs
Jack Kligman	United States District Court for the Eastern District of Pennsylvania	1985	Conspiracy and mail fraud
Hector Osvaldo Labagnara	United States District Court for the District of New Jersey	1976	Conspiracy to transport stolen motor vehicles in interstate commerce, to receive and sell stolen motor vehicles, to transport false vehicle registrations in interstate commerce, and to receive and dispose of false vehicle registrations, receipt and sale of stolen motor vehicles
Moses Jubilee Lestz, fka Michael Eugene Lestz	United States District Court for the Western District of Arkansas	1982	Forgery of United States savings bond
Leon Lee Liebscher	United States District Court for the Western District of Oklahoma	1982	Conspiracy to defraud the United States (tax evasion)
Pierluigi Mancini	United States District Court for the Northern District of Georgia	1985	Possession of cocaine with intent to distribute
John Ross McCown Jr.	United States District Court for the District of Nebraska	1992	Structuring of transactions to evade reporting requirements
Edward Francis McKenna, III	United States District Court for the Southern District of Mississippi	1993	Possession with intent to distribute anabolic steroids
Andrew Kirkpatrick Mearns, III	United States District Court for the District of Delaware	1978	Conspiracy to distribute and possess with intent to distribute cocaine
Ralph Eugene Meczyk	United States District Court for the Northern District of Illinois	1987	Filing false partnership and individual federal income tax returns and aiding and abetting therein
Philip James Morin	United States District Court for the Western District of Texas	1984	Distribution of cocaine
Thomas Edward Nash Jr.	United States District Court for the Western District of North Carolina	1988	Conspiracy to restrain interstate trade and commerce
Roger Lee Nelson	District of Nebraska	1981	Aiding and abetting mail fraud
Jose Rene Pineda-Martinez	United States District Court for the Southern District of Texas (all 3)	1983; 1983; 1984	Entering U.S. without inspection (misdemeanor); Transporting an illegal alien within the U.S. (1983 & 1984)
James William Rogers	United States District Court for the District of South Carolina	1983 (as modified)	Conspiracy to commit racketeering
George Wisham Roper, II	United States District Court for the Eastern District of Virginia	1974	Conspiracy to bribe public officials and to defraud the United States government
Daniel Rostenkowski	United States District Court for the District of Columbia	1996	Mail fraud (two counts)
Dean Raymond Rush	United States District Court for the Western District of Texas	1993	False statements on a loan application
Archibald R. Schaffer, III	United States District Court for the District of Columbia	2000	Violation of the Meat Inspection Act
Anthony Andrew Schmidt	United States District Court for the District of Kansas	1985	Conspiracy to possess and distribute cocaine
Stanley Sirote	United States District Court for the Eastern District of New York	1974	Bribery of a public official
Dent Elwood Snider Jr.	United States District Court for the District of Colorado	1981	Use of a telephone to facilitate the distribution of cocaine
James Lawrence Swisher	United States District Court for the Middle District North Carolina	1977	Obstruction of a criminal investigation
Larry Kalvy Thompson	United States District Court for the Northern District of Texas	1988	Aiding and abetting misapplication of bank funds, misprision of a felony
Stephanie Marie Vetter	United States District Court for the District of New Mexico	1979	Possession with intent to distribute methamphetamine
Danny Ray Walker	United States District Court for the Eastern District of Arkansas	1975	Interstate transportation of stolen property
Thomas Andrew Warren	United States District Court for the Southern District of Florida	1975	Conspiracy to import marijuana
Michael Lynn Weatherford	United States District Court for the Eastern District of North Carolina	1986	Aiding and abetting interstate travel in aid of racketeering
Jack Weinstein	District of Nevada	1975	Conspiracy and interstate transportation of stolen property
Robert Owen Wilson	United States District Court for the Middle District Tennessee	1980	Mail fraud,
Charles Elvin Witherspoon	United States District Court for the Eastern District of Texas	1977	Embezzlement of bank funds
Charles Z. Yonce Jr.	United States District Court for the District of South Carolina	1988	Conspiracy to possess with intent to distribute cocaine and aiding and abetting therein

== January 20, 2001 ==
Name	District	Sentenced	Offense
Verla Jean Allen	United States District Court for the Western District of Arkansas	1990	False statements to agency of United States
Susan Lisa Rosenberg	United States District Court	1985	Charged with a role in the 1983 bombing of the United States Capitol Building, the U.S. National War College and the New York Patrolmen's Benevolent Association
Bernice Ruth Altschul	United States District Court for the District of Arizona	1992	Conspiracy to commit money laundering
Nicholas M. Altiere	United States District Court for the Southern District of Florida	1983	Importation of cocaine
Joe Anderson Jr.	United States District Court for the Southern District of Alabama	1988	Income tax evasion
William Sterling Anderson	United States District Court for the District of South Carolina	1987	Conspiracy to defraud a federally insured financial institution, false statements to a federally insured financial institution, wire fraud
Mansour T. Azizkhani	United States District Court for the Western District of Oklahoma	1984	Conspiracy and making false statements in bank loan applications
Gregory Duanne Boss	United States District Court for the Eastern District of Arkansas	2000	Possession of Contraband Weapons
Cleveland Victor Babin Jr.	United States District Court for the Western District of Oklahoma	1987	Conspiracy to commit offense against the United States by utilizing the U.S. mail in furtherance of a scheme to defraud
Chris Harmon Bagley	United States District Court for the Western District of Oklahoma	1989	Conspiracy to possess with intent to distribute cocaine
Scott Lynn Bane	United States District Court for the Central District of Illinois	1984	Unlawful distribution of marijuana
Thomas Cleveland Barber	United States District Court for the Middle District of Florida	1977	Issuing worthless checks
Peggy Ann Bargon	United States District Court for the Central District of Illinois	1995	Violation of Lacey Act, violation of Bald Eagle Protection Act
Tansukhlal Bhatka	United States District Court for the Western District of Arkansas	1991	Filing fraudulent income tax returns
David Roscoe Blampied	United States District Court for the District of Idaho	1979	Conspiracy to distribute cocaine
William Arthur Borders Jr.	United States District Court for the Northern District of Georgia	1982	Conspiracy to corruptly solicit and accept money in return for influencing the official acts of a federal district court judge (Alcee L. Hastings), and to defraud the United States in connection with the performance of lawful government functions; corruptly influencing, obstructing, impeding, and endeavoring to influence, obstruct, and impede the due administration of justice and aiding and abetting therein; traveling interstate with intent to commit bribery
Arthur David Borel	United States District Court for the Eastern District of Arkansas	1991	Odometer rollback
Douglas Charles Borel	United States District Court for the Eastern District of Arkansas	1991	Odometer rollback
George Thomas Brabham	United States District Court for the Eastern District of Texas	1989	Making a false statement or report to a federally insured bank
Almon Glenn Braswell	United States District Court for the Northern District of Georgia (all 3)	1983 (all 3)	Mail fraud Perjury; Filing false income tax return
Leonard Browder	United States District Court for the District of South Carolina	1990	Illegal dispensing of controlled substance, Medicaid fraud
David Steven Brown	United States District Court for the Southern District of New York	1987	Securities fraud, mail fraud
Delores Caroylene Burleson	United States District Court for the Eastern District of Oklahoma	1978	Possession of marijuana
John H. Bustamante	United States District Court for the Northern District of Ohio	1993	Wire fraud
Mary Louise Campbell	United States District Court for the Northern District of Mississippi	1988	Aiding and abetting the unauthorized use and transfer of food stamps
Eloida Candelaria	District of New Mexico	1992	False information in registering to vote
Dennis Sobrevinas Capili	United States District Court for the Eastern District of California	1990	Filing false statements in alien registration
Donna Denise Chambers	United States District Court for the Eastern District of Wisconsin	1986	Conspiracy to possess with intent to distribute and to distribute cocaine, possession with intent to distribute cocaine, use of a telephone to facilitate cocaine conspiracy
Douglas Eugene Chapman	United States District Court for the Eastern District of Arkansas	1993	Bank fraud
Ronald Keith Chapman	United States District Court for the Eastern District of Arkansas	1993	Bank fraud
Francisco Larios Chavez	United States District Court for the Southern District of California	1986	Aiding and abetting illegal entry of aliens
Henry G. Cisneros	United States District Court for the District of Columbia	1999	False statement (misdemeanor)
Roger Clinton	1. United States District Court for the Western District of Arkansas (both)	1985 (both)	Conspiracy to distribute cocaine Distribution of cocaine Clinton's pardon of Roger Clinton was met with some controversy due to allegations of nepotism.
Stuart Harris Cohn	United States District Court for the Southern District of New York	1983	Illegal sale of commodity options
David M. Cooper	United States District Court for the Northern District of Ohio	1992	Conspiracy to defraud the government
Ernest Harley Cox Jr.	United States District Court for the Eastern District of Arkansas	1991	Conspiracy to defraud a federally insured savings and loan, misapplication of bank funds, false statements
John F. Cross Jr.	United States District Court for the Eastern District of Arkansas	1995	Embezzlement
Rickey Lee Cunningham	United States District Court for the Southern District of Texas	1973	Possession with intent to distribute marijuana
Richard Anthony De Labio	United States District Court for the District of Maryland	1977	Mail fraud and aiding and abetting
John Deutch	United States District Court for the District of Columbia	N/A	Offenses charged on January 19, 2001, information
Richard Douglas	United States District Court for the Northern District of California	1998	False statements to a government agent
Edward Reynolds Downe Jr.	United States District Court for the Southern District of New York	1993	Conspiracy to commit wire fraud and to subscribe to false income tax returns, securities fraud
Marvin Dean Dudley	United States District Court for the District of Nebraska	1992	False statements
Larry Lee Duncan	United States District Court for the Western District of Oklahoma	1992	Altering an automobile odometer
Robert Clinton Fain	United States District Court for the Eastern District of Arkansas	1982	Aiding and assisting in the preparation and filing of a false corporate tax return
Marcos Arcenio Fernandez	United States District Court for the Southern District of Florida	1980	Conspiracy to possess with intent to distribute marijuana
Alvarez Ferrouillet	United States District Court for the Eastern District of Louisiana; United States District Court for the Northern District of Mississippi	1997 (both)	Interstate transportation of stolen property; money laundering; engaging in a monetary transaction with criminally derived property; false statements to government agents Conspiracy to make false statements to a financial institution
William Denis Fugazy	United States District Court for the Southern District of New York	1997	Perjury in a bankruptcy proceeding
Lloyd Reid George	United States District Court for the Eastern District of Arkansas	1997	Aiding and abetting mail fraud
Louis Goldstein	United States District Court for the Northern District of Illinois	1985	Possession of goods stolen from interstate shipment
Rubye Lee Gordon	United States District Court for the Middle District Georgia	1974	Forgery of U.S. Treasury checks
Pincus Green	United States District Court for the Southern District of New York	N/A	Wire fraud, mail fraud, racketeering, racketeering conspiracy, criminal forfeiture, income tax evasion, trading with Iran in violation of trade embargo (as charged in 1984 superseding indictment)
Robert Ivey Hamner	United States District Court for the Central District of Illinois	1986	Conspiracy to distribute marijuana, possession of marijuana with intent to distribute
Samuel Price Handley	United States District Court for the Western District of Kentucky	1963	Conspiracy to steal government property
Woodie Randolph Handley	United States District Court for the Western District of Kentucky	1963	Conspiracy to steal government property
Jay Houston Harmon	1. United States District Court for the Eastern District of Arkansas	1. 1982	1. Conspiracy to import marijuana, conspiracy to possess marijuana with intent to distribute, importation of marijuana, possession of marijuana with intent to distribute
Jay Houston Harmon	2. United States District Court for the Middle District Georgia	2. 1986	2. Conspiracy to import cocaine
John J. Hemmingson	United States District Court for the Eastern District of Louisiana	1997	Interstate transportation of stolen property; money laundering; engaging in a monetary transaction with criminally derived property
David S. Herdlinger	United States District Court for the Western District of Arkansas	1986	Mail fraud
Debi Rae Huckleberry (fka Debi Rae VanDenakker)	United States District Court for the District of Utah	1986	Distribution of methamphetamine
Donald Ray James	United States District Court for the Western District of Tennessee	1983	Mail fraud, wire fraud, false statements to a bank to influence credit approval
Stanley Pruet Jobe	United States District Court for the Western District of Texas	1994	Conspiracy to commit bank fraud, bank fraud
Ruben H. Johnson	United States District Court for the Western District of Texas	1989	Theft and misapplication of bank funds by a bank officer or director (13 counts)
Linda Jones (fka Linda D. Medlar)	United States District Court for the Northern District of Texas	1998	Conspiracy to commit bank fraud, to make a false statement to a bank, to launder monetary instruments, and to engage in monetary transactions in property derived from specific unlawful activity; aiding and abetting bank fraud, false statements to a bank, laundering monetary instruments, and engaging in monetary transactions in property derived from specific unlawful activity; obstruction of justice; falsifying, concealing and covering up a material fact by trick, scheme, or device; making a false statement
James Howard Lake	United States District Court for the District of Columbia	1998	Illegal corporate campaign contributions (two counts), wire fraud
June Louise Lewis	United States District Court for the Northern District of Ohio	1991	Embezzlement by a bank employee
Salim Bonnor Lewis	United States District Court for the Southern District of New York	1989	Securities fraud, record keeping violations, margin violations
John Leighton Lodwick	United States District Court for the Western District of Mo.	1968	Income tax evasion
Hildebrando Lopez	United States District Court for the Southern District of Texas	1981	Distribution of cocaine
Jose Julio Luaces Jr.	United States District Court for the Southern District of Florida	1989	Possession of an unregistered firearm
James Timothy Maness	United States District Court for the Western District of Tennessee	1985	Conspiracy to distribute Valium
James Lowell Manning	United States District Court for the Eastern District of Arkansas	1982	Aiding and assisting in the preparation of a false corporate income tax return
John Robert Martin	United States District Court for the Northern District of Florida	1987	Income tax evasion
Frank Ayala Martinez	United States District Court for the Western District of Texas	1989	Conspiracy to supply false documents to the Immigration and Naturalization Service
Silvia Leticia Beltran Martinez	United States District Court for the Western District of Texas	1989	Conspiracy to supply false documents to the Immigration and Naturalization Service
John Francis McCormick	United States District Court for the District of Massachusetts	1988	Racketeering, racketeering conspiracy, aiding and abetting Hobbs Act extortion (five counts);
Susan H. McDougal	United States District Court for the Eastern District of Arkansas	1996	Mail fraud; aiding and abetting in misapplication of Small Business Investment Corporation funds; aiding and abetting in making false entries; aiding and abetting in making false statements
Howard Lawrence Mechanic (aka Gary Robert Tredway)	United States District Court for the Eastern District of Missouri; United States District Court for the District of Arizona (2000 times)	1970	Violating the Civil Disobedience Act of 1968; Failure to appear Making a false statement in acquiring a passport
Brook K. Mitchell Sr.	United States District Court for the District of Columbia	1999	Conspiracy to illegally obtain USDA subsidy payments, false statements to USDA (two counts), false entries on USDA forms
Charles Wilfred Morgan, III	United States District Court for the Western District of Arkansas	1984	Conspiracy to distribute cocaine. Former white house associate counsel William H. Kennedy III reportedly used his past links to the Clinton administration to obtain a pardon for Morgan who was his client.
Samuel Loring Morison	United States District Court for the District of Maryland	1985	Willful transmission of defense information, unauthorized possession and retention of defense information, theft of government property
Richard Anthony Nazzaro	United States District Court for the District of Massachusetts	1988	Perjury, conspiracy to commit mail fraud
Charlene Ann Nosenko	United States District Court for the Northern District of Illinois	1990	Conspiracy to defraud the United States, influencing or injuring an officer or juror generally
Vernon Raymond Obermeier	United States District Court for the Southern District of Illinois	1989	Conspiracy to distribute cocaine, distribution of cocaine, and using a communications facility to facilitate distribution of cocaine
Miguelina Ogalde	United States District Court for the District of Puerto Rico	1981	Conspiracy to import cocaine
David C. Owen	United States District Court for the District of Kansas	1993	Filing a false tax return
Robert William Palmer	United States District Court for the Eastern District of Arkansas	1995	Conspiracy to make false statements
Kelli Anne Perhosky (fka Kelli Anne Flynn)	United States District Court for the Western District of Pennsylvania	1989	Conspiracy to commit mail fraud
Richard H. Pezzopane	United States District Court for the Northern District of Illinois	1988	Conspiracy to commit racketeering, mail fraud
Orville Rex Phillips	United States District Court for the Western District of Texas	1991	Unlawful structuring of a financial transaction
Vinson Stewart Poling Jr.	United States District Court for the District of Maryland	1980	Making a false bank entry and aiding and abetting
Normal Lyle Prouse	United States District Court for the District of Minnesota	1990	Operating or directing the operation of a common carrier while under the influence of alcohol
Willie H. H. Pruitt Jr.	U.S. Air Force (court-martial)	1954	Absent without official leave
Danny Martin Pursley Sr.	United States District Court for the Middle District of Tennessee	1991	Aiding and abetting the conduct of an illegal gambling business, obstruction of state laws to facilitate illegal gambling
Charles D. Ravenel	United States District Court for the District of South Carolina	1996	Conspiring to defraud the United States
William Clyde Ray	United States District Court for the Western District of Oklahoma	1989	Fraud using the telephone
Alfredo Luna Regalado	United States District Court for the Southern District of Texas	1987	Failure to report the transportation of currency in excess of $10,000 into the United States
Ildefonso Reynes Ricafort	Veterans Administration Compensation and Pension Service	1987	Submission of false claims to Veterans Administration
Marc Rich	United States District Court for the Southern District of New York	N/A	Wire fraud, mail fraud, racketeering, racketeering conspiracy, criminal forfeiture, income tax evasion, trading with Iran in violation of trade embargo (as charged in 1984 superseding indictment)
Howard Winfield Riddle	United States District Court for the Northern District of Texas	1989	Violation of the Lacey Act (receipt of illegally imported animal skins)
Richard Wilson Riley Jr.	United States District Court for the District of South Carolina	1993	Conspiring to possess with intent to distribute and to distribute marijuana and cocaine
Samuel Lee Robbins	United States District Court for the Western District of Texas	1990	Misprision of a felony
Joel Gonzales Rodriguez	United States District Court for the Southern District of Texas	1991	Theft of mail by a postal employee
Michael James Rogers	United States District Court for the Southern District of Texas	1977	Conspiracy to possess with intent to distribute marijuana
Anna Louise Ross	United States District Court for the Northern District of Texas	1988	Distribution of cocaine
Gerald Glen Rust	United States District Court for the Eastern District of Texas	1991	False declarations before grand jury
Jerri Ann Rust	United States District Court for the Eastern District of Texas	1991	False declarations before grand jury
Bettye June Rutherford	District of New Mexico	1992	Possession of marijuana with intent to distribute
Gregory Lee Sands	United States District Court for the District of North Dakota	1990	Conspiracy to distribute cocaine
Adolph Schwimmer	United States District Court for the Southern District of California	1950	Conspiracy to violate the Neutrality Act and export control laws, and conspiracy to export arms, ammunition, etc. to a foreign country
Albert A. Seretti Jr.	District of Nevada	1983	Conspiracy and wire fraud
Patricia Campbell Hearst Shaw	United States District Court for the Northern District of California	1976	Armed bank robbery, using a firearm during a felony
Dennis Joseph Smith	U.S. Army (court-martial) (all)	1951; 1952; 1954	Unauthorized absence Failure to obey off-limits instructions Unauthorized absence
Gerald Owen Smith	United States District Court for the Southern District of Mississippi	1956	Armed bank robbery
Stephen A. Smith	United States District Court for the Eastern District of Arkansas	1996	Conspiracy to misapply Small Business Administration loans
Jimmie Lee Speake	United States District Court for the Northern District of Texas	1976	Conspiracy to possess and utter counterfeit $20 Federal Reserve notes
Charles Bernard Stewart	United States District Court for the Middle District of Georgia	1986	Illegally destroying U.S. mail
Marlena Francisca Stewart-Rollins	United States District Court for the Northern District of Ohio	1989	Conspiracy to distribute cocaine
John Fife Symington, III	United States District Court for the District of Arizona	N/A	False statements to federally insured financial institutions, wire fraud, attempted extortion, false statements in bankruptcy proceeding
Richard Lee Tannehill	United States District Court for the District of Colorado	1990	Conspiracy in restraint of trade
Nicholas C. Tenaglia	United States District Court for the Eastern District of Pennsylvania	1985	Receipt of illegal payments under the Medicare program
Gary Allen Thomas	United States District Court for the Western District of Texas	1987	Theft of mail by postal employee
Larry Weldon Todd	United States District Court for the Western District of Texas	1983	Conspiracy to commit an offense against the United States in violation of the Lacey Act and the Airborne Hunting Act
Olga C. Trevino	United States District Court for the Western District of Texas	1987	Misapplication by a bank employee
Ignatious Vamvouklis	United States District Court for the District of New Hampshire	1991	Possession of cocaine
Patricia A. Van De Weerd	United States District Court for the Western District of Wisconsin	1990	Theft by U.S. postal employee
Christopher V. Wade	United States District Court for the Eastern District of Arkansas	1995	Bank fraud, false statements on a loan application
Bill Wayne Warmath	United States District Court for the Western District of Tennessee	1965	Obstruction of correspondence
Jack Kenneth Watson	United States District Court for the District of Oregon	1985	Making false statements of material facts to the United States Forest Service
Donna Lynn Webb	United States District Court for the Northern District of Florida	1989	False entry in savings and loan record by employee
Donald William Wells	United States District Court for the Middle District North Carolina	1973	Possession of an unregistered firearm
Robert H. Wendt	United States District Court for the Eastern District of Mo.	1982	Conspiracy to effectuate the escape of a federal prisoner
Jack L. Williams	United States District Court for the District of Columbia	1998	Making false statements to federal agents (two counts)
Kevin Arthur Williams	United States District Court for the District of Nebraska	1990	Conspiracy to distribute and possess with intent to distribute crack cocaine
Robert Michael Williams	United States District Court for the Eastern District of Mich.	1981	Conspiracy to transport in foreign commerce securities obtained by fraud
Jimmie Lee Wilson	United States District Court for the Eastern District of Arkansas	1990	Converting property mortgaged or pledged to a farm credit agency, converting public money to personal use
Thelma Louise Wingate	United States District Court for the Middle District Georgia	1991	Mail fraud
Mitchell Couey Wood	United States District Court for the Eastern District of Arkansas	1986	Conspiracy to possess and to distribute cocaine
Warren Stannard Wood	United States District Court for the Southern District of California	1978	Conspiracy to defraud the United States by filing a false document with the Securities and Exchange Commission
Dewey Worthey	United States District Court for the Eastern District of Arkansas	1988	Medicaid fraud
Rick Allen Yale	United States District Court for the Southern District of Illinois	1992	Bank fraud
Joseph A. Yasak	United States District Court for the Northern District of Illinois	1988	Knowingly making under oath a false declaration regarding a material fact before a grand jury
William Stanley Yingling	United States District Court for the Eastern District of Arkansas	1979	Receipt of a stolen motor vehicle
Philip David Young	United States District Court for the Western District of Louisiana	1992	Interstate transportation and sale of fish and wildlife

== See also ==
- Article Two of the United States Constitution
- Federal pardons in the United States
- List of people pardoned or granted clemency by the president of the United States
- List of people pardoned by George W. Bush
- List of people granted executive clemency by Barack Obama
- List of people granted executive clemency by Donald Trump
