= List of people granted executive clemency by Barack Obama =

By the end of his second and final term on January 20, 2017, United States President Barack Obama had exercised his constitutional power to grant the executive clemency—that is, "pardon, commutation of sentence, remission of fine or restitution, and reprieve"—to 1,927 individuals convicted of federal crimes. Of the acts of clemency, 1,715 were commutations (including 504 life sentences) and 212 were pardons. Most individuals granted executive clemency by Obama had been convicted on drug charges, and had received lengthy and sometimes mandatory sentences at the height of the war on drugs.

Obama granted 330 commutations on January 19, 2017, his last full day in office, setting a record for the largest single-day use of the clemency power that would stand until Joe Biden commuted nearly 1,500 sentences on December 12, 2024. Obama also issued more commutations than the past 13 presidents combined.

== Constitutional provision ==
The pardon powers of the president are outlined in Article Two of the United States Constitution (Section 2, Clause 1), which provides:

The President shall be Commander in Chief of the Army and Navy of the United States, and of the Militia of the several States, when called into the actual Service of the United States; he may require the Opinion, in writing, of the principal Officer in each of the executive Departments, upon any Subject relating to the Duties of their respective Offices, and he shall have Power to grant Reprieves and Pardons for Offenses against the United States, except in Cases of Impeachment.

== Definitions ==
A pardon is an executive order granting clemency for a conviction, it may be granted "at any point after the ... commission" of the crime. As per Justice Department regulations, convicted persons may only apply five or more years after their sentence has been completed. However, the president's power to pardon is not restricted by any temporal constraints except that the crime must have been committed. Its practical effect is the restoration of civil rights and statutory disabilities (e.g., firearm rights, occupational licensing) associated with a past criminal conviction. In rarer cases, such as the pardon of Richard Nixon, a pardon can also halt criminal proceedings and prevent an indictment.

A commutation is the mitigation of the sentence of someone currently serving a sentence for a crime pursuant to a conviction, without vacating the conviction itself.

== Pardons and commutations ==
This is a partial list of people pardoned or granted clemency by a United States president, ordered by date of pardon or commutation. For an updated list, see U.S. Department of Justice.

=== Pardons ===
==== December 3, 2010 ====
Name	Court or home city	Sentencing date	Sentence	Offense
James Bernard Banks	United States District Court for the District of Utah	1972	2 years' probation	Illegal possession of government property
Russell James Dixon	United States District Court for the Northern District of Georgia	1960	2 years' probation	Liquor law violation
Laurens Dorsey	United States District Court for the District of New Jersey	1998	5 years' probation; $71,000 restitution	Conspiracy to defraud by making false statements to the Food and Drug Administration
Ronald Lee Foster	United States District Court for the Eastern District of North Carolina	1963	Probation; $20 fine	Mutilation of coins
Timothy James Gallagher	United States District Court for the District of Arizona	1982	3 years' probation	Cocaine possession and conspiracy to distribute
Roxane Kay Hettinger	United States District Court for the Northern District of Iowa	1986	30 days in jail; 3 years' probation	Conspiracy to distribute cocaine
Edgar Leopold Kranz Jr.	General court-martial convened at Hickam Air Force Base	1994	24 months' confinement; reduction in pay	Cocaine use, adultery and bouncing checks
Floretta Leavy	United States District Court for the District of Kansas	1994	1 year in prison; 3 years' probation	Drug offenses
Scoey Lathaniel Morris	United States District Court for the Western District of Texas	1991	3 years' probation; $1,200 fine	Counterfeiting offense.

==== May 20, 2011 ====
Name	Court or home city	Sentencing date	Sentence	Offense
Randy Eugene Dyer	United States District Court for the Western District of Washington	1975	5 years in prison	Conspiracy to import marijuana (hashish), conspiracy to remove baggage from the custody and control of the U.S. Customs Service and convey false information concerning an attempt to damage a civil aircraft
Danny Alonzo Levitz	United States District Court for the Northern District of Indiana	1980	2 years of probation, $400 fine	Conspiracy
Michael Ray Neal	United States District Court for the Eastern District of Virginia	1991	6 months in prison, 3 years of supervised release conditioned on 6 months of home confinement, $2,500 fine	Manufacture, assembly, modification and distribution of equipment for unauthorized decryption of satellite cable programming
Edwin Alan North	United States District Court for the Northern District of Indiana	1980	6 months of unsupervised probation	Transfer of a firearm without payment of transfer tax
Allen Edward Peratt	United States District Court for the District of South Dakota	1990	30 months in prison, 5 years of supervised release	Conspiracy to distribute methamphetamine
Christine Marie Rossiter	United States District Court for the District of Nebraska	1992	3 years of probation conditioned on performance of 500 hours of community service	Conspiracy to distribute less than 50 kilograms of marijuana
Patricia Ann Weinzatl	United States District Court for the Western District of Wisconsin	2001	3 years of probation, $5,000 fine	Structuring transactions to evade reporting requirements
Bobby Gerald Wilson	United States District Court for the Southern District of Georgia	1985	3½ months in prison, 5 years of probation conditioned on performance of 300 hours of community service, $400 fine	Aiding and abetting the possession and sale of illegal American alligator hides (Lacey Act)

==== November 21, 2011 ====
Name	Court or home city	Sentencing date	Sentence	Offense
Lesley Claywood Berry Jr.	United States District Court for the District of Minnesota	1988	3 years in prison	Conspiracy to manufacture, possess with intent to distribute, and distribute marijuana
Bobby Jackson	United States District Court for the Middle District of Alabama	1987	5 years' probation and $20,000 fine	Conspiracy to possess with intent to distribute in excess of 1,000 pounds of marijuana
Ricky Dale Collett	United States District Court for the Eastern District of Kentucky	2002	1 year of probation conditioned on 60 days of home detention	Aiding and abetting in the manufacture of 61 marijuana plants
Martin Kaprelian	United States District Court for the Northern District of Illinois	1984	9 years in prison, 5 years of probation	Conspiracy to transport stolen property in interstate commerce, transporting stolen property, concealing stolen property
Thomas Paul Ledford	United States District Court for the Eastern District of Tennessee	1995	1 year of probation conditioned on performance of 100 hours of community service	Conducting and directing an illegal gambling business

==== March 1, 2013 ====
Name	Court or home city	Sentencing date	Sentence	Offense
Robert Leroy Bebee	Rockville, Maryland	1979	Two years' probation	Misprision (concealment) of a felony
James Anthony Bordinaro	Gloucester, Massachusetts	1991	12 months' imprisonment, three years' supervised release and a $55,000 fine	Conspiracy to restrain, suppress, and eliminate competition in violation of the Sherman Act; conspiracy to submit false statements
Kelli Elisabeth Collins	Harrison, Arkansas	1994	Five years' probation	Aiding and abetting a wire fraud
Edwin Hardy Futch Jr.	Pembroke, Georgia	1976	Five years' probation, $2,399.72 restitution	Theft from an interstate shipment
Cindy Marie Griffith	Moyock, North Carolina	2000	Two years' probation with 100 hours of community service	Distribution of satellite cable television decryption devices
Roy Eugene Grimes Sr.	Athens, Tennessee	1961	18 months' probation	Falsely altering a United States postal money order, uttering, and publishing a forged and altered money order with intent to defraud
Jon Christopher Kozeliski	Decatur, Illinois	1994	One year of probation with six months of home confinement, $10,000 fine	Conspiracy to traffic counterfeit goods
Jimmy Ray Mattison	Anderson, South Carolina	1969	Three years' probation	Conspiracy to transport and cause the transportation of altered securities in interstate commerce; transporting and causing the transportation of altered securities in interstate commerce
An Na Peng	Honolulu, Hawaii	1996	Two years' probation, $2,000 fine	Conspiracy to defraud the Immigration and Naturalization Service
Michael John Petri	Montrose, South Dakota	1989	Five years' imprisonment, three years' supervised release	Conspiracy to possess with intent to distribute and distribution of a controlled substance (cocaine)
Karen Alicia Ragee	Decatur, Illinois	1994	One year of probation with six months of home confinement, $2,500 fine	Conspiracy to traffic counterfeit goods
Jamari Salleh	Alexandria, Virginia	1989	Four years' probation, $5,000 fine, $5,900 restitution	False claims upon and against the United States
Alfor Sharkey	Omaha, Nebraska	1994	Three years' probation with 100 hours of community service, $2,750 restitution	Unauthorized acquisition of food stamps
Donald Barrie Simon Jr.	Chattanooga, Tennessee	1982	Two years' imprisonment, three years' probation	Aiding and abetting in the theft of an interstate shipment
Lynn Marie Stanek	Tualatin, Oregon	1986	Six months in jail, five years' probation conditioned on residence in a community treatment center for a period not to exceed one year	Unlawful use of a communication facility to distribute cocaine
Larry Wayne Thornton	Forsyth, Georgia	1974	Four years' probation	Possession of an unregistered firearm; possession of a firearm without a serial number
Donna Kaye Wright	Friendship, Tennessee	1983	54 days' imprisonment, three years' probation conditioned on performance of six hours of community service per week	Embezzlement and misapplication of bank funds

==== December 19, 2013 ====
Name	Court or home city	Sentencing date	Sentence	Offense
William Ricardo Alvarez	Marietta, Georgia District of Puerto Rico	1979	Time served after nine months' imprisonment, four years' supervised release (April 30, 1997; amended July 31, 1997)	Conspiracy to possess with intent to distribute heroin; conspiracy to import heroin
Charlie Lee Davis Jr.	Wetumpka, Alabama Middle District of Alabama	1995	87 months' imprisonment, five years' supervised release (March 21, 1995)	Possession with intent to distribute cocaine base; use of a minor to distribute cocaine base
Ronald Eugene Greenwood	Crane, Missouri District of South Dakota	1996	Three years' probation, conditioned on six months' home confinement, 100 hours' community service, $5,000 restitution, $1,000 fine (November 18, 1996)	Conspiracy to violate the Clean Water Act
Little Joe Hatch, aka Joe Hatch Sr.	Lake Placid, Florida Southern District of Florida	1990	60 months' imprisonment, four years' supervised release (May 15, 1990)	Possession with intent to distribute marijuana
Martin Alan Hatcher	Foley, Alabama, Southern District Of Alabama	1992	5 years' probation	Distribution and possession with intent to distribute marijuana
Derek James Laliberte	District of Maine	(October 2, 1992; amended May 21, 1993).	18 months' imprisonment, 2 years' supervised release	Money laundering
Alfred J. Mack	District of Columbia Superior Court	(April 5, 1982)	18 to 54 months' imprisonment	Unlawful distribution of heroin
Robert Andrew Schindler	District of Utah	(May 14, 1996).	Three years' probation, four months' home confinement, $10,000 restitution	Conspiracy to commit wire fraud and mail fraud
Willie Shaw Jr.	District of South Carolina	(August 7, 1974)	Fifteen years' imprisonment	Armed bank robbery
Kimberly Lynn Stout, formerly known as Kimberly Lynn Cooley	Western District of Virginia	(November 9, 1993)	One day's imprisonment, three years' supervised release (including five months' home confinement)	Bank embezzlement, fraud
Bernard Anthony Sutton Jr.	Eastern District of Virginia	(April 4, 1989)	Three years' probation, $825 restitution, $500 fine	Theft of personal property
Chris Deann Switzer	District of Nebraska	(June 25, 1996)	Four years' probation, conditioned on six months' home confinement, 200 hours' community service	Conspiracy to violate narcotics laws (methamphetamine)
Miles Thomas Wilson	Williamsburg, Ohio Southern District of Ohio	1981	Three years' probation (July 15, 1981)	Mail fraud

==== January 17, 2017 ====
During his 4th to last day in office, Obama pardoned James Cartwright, who was awaiting sentencing for giving false statements to federal investigators, and Willie McCovey was pardoned for tax evasion.

=== Commutations ===
==== November 21, 2011 ====
Name	Court	Sentenced	Sentence	Offense	Terms of commutation
Eugenia Marie Jennings	United States District Court for the Southern District of Illinois	2001	262 months (21 years, 10 months) in prison, 8 years of supervised release, $1,750 fine	Distribution of cocaine base	Sentence expired on December 21, 2011, leaving intact and in effect the eight-year term of supervised release with all its conditions and all other components of the sentence.
Mark Anthony Jones	United States District Court for the Northern District of Florida	1999	Life imprisonment; 10 years' supervised release	Distribution of cocaine base	Prison sentence commuted to expire on November 10, 2015, leaving intact and in effect the 10-year term of supervised release with all its conditions and all other components of the sentence.
Rory Larry Lee	United States District Court for the Middle District of Florida	1990	Life imprisonment; 10 years' supervised release	Conspiracy to possess with intent to distribute cocaine base (enhanced penalty), distribution of 50 grams or more of cocaine base (two counts)	N/A.

December 19, 2013

Name	Court	Sentenced	Sentence	Offense	Terms of commutation
Clarence Aaron	United States District Court for the Southern District of Alabama	December 10, 1993	Life imprisonment; 5 years' supervised release	Conspiracy to possess with intent to distribute cocaine and cocaine base, possession with intent to distribute cocaine, attempt to possess cocaine with intent to distribute (erroneously listed in the judgment as conspiracy to distribute cocaine)	Sentence of imprisonment to expire on April 17, 2014, leaving intact and in effect the five-year term of supervised release with all its conditions and all other components of the sentence

==== July 13, 2015 ====
On this day, Obama announced he would be commuting the sentences of 46 drug offenders.

==== June 3, 2016 ====
On this day, Obama announced he would be commuting the sentences of 42 offenders.

Name	Court	Sentencing date	Time served	Offense	Terms of commutation
Eric E. Alvarez	Eastern District of North Carolina	2000	360 months (30 years) in prison, 5 years of supervised release	Distribution of cocaine and cocaine base	Sentence expired on October 1, 2016, leaving intact and in effect the five-year term of supervised release with all its conditions and all other components of the sentence.
Dale Baldwin	Middle District of Florida	1995	Life imprisonment; 10 years' supervised release	Conspiracy to possess with intent to distribute cocaine base	Prison sentence commuted to expire on October 1, 2016, leaving intact and in effect the 10-year term of supervised release with all its conditions and all other components of the sentence.

==== December 20, 2016 ====
Obama granted 78 commutations on this day.

==== January 17, 2017 ====
On this day, Obama pardoned 64 individuals and commuted the sentence of 209 individuals (109 of whom faced life sentences). These included Chelsea Manning, Rohit Jawa and Oscar López Rivera, enabling them to be released from prison on May 17, 2017.

==== January 19, 2017 ====
Obama commuted the prison sentences of 330 federal inmates on Thursday, January 19, 2017, his last full day in office. Obama did so, as one of his final acts in office, in order to reduce what he viewed as overly harsh punishments.

== See also ==
- Article Two of the United States Constitution
- Federal pardons in the United States
- List of people pardoned or granted clemency by the president of the United States
- List of people pardoned by George W. Bush
- List of people pardoned by Bill Clinton
- List of people granted executive clemency in the first Trump presidency
- List of people granted executive clemency in the second Trump presidency

== Notes ==
1. As he finishes his second year in office, Obama pardons nine people
2. "President Obama Grants Nine Pardons". whitehouse.gov. December 3, 2010 – via National Archives.
