= Poly Sci =

Studio album by John Forté
- Released: June 23, 1998
- Recorded: 1997–98
- Studio: Booga Basement (East Orange, NJ); Chung King (New York, NY); Joe's Room (Conshohocken, PA); The Hit Factory (New York, NY); Mayfair (London, UK); The Crib (New York, NY)
- Genre: Hip-hop
- Length: 55:09
- Label: Ruffhouse; Columbia
- Producer: John Forté; Minnesota; Pras; Salaam Remi; Warren Riker; Wyclef Jean

John Forté chronology
Poly Sci (1998)	I, John (2002)

Singles from Poly Sci
- 1. "Ninety Nine (Flash the Message)" Released: May 12, 1998

Poly Sci is the debut solo studio album by American hip-hop musician John Forté. It was released on June 23, 1998, on Ruffhouse Records. The recording sessions took place at Booga Basement Studio in East Orange, at Chung King Studios, at The Hit Factory and at The Crib in New York, at Joe's Room in Conshohocken, and at Mayfair Studios in London. The production was primarily handled by Forté, as well as Minnesota, Pras, Salaam Remi, Warren Riker and Wyclef Jean.

== Critical reception ==
Professional ratings
Review scores
Source	Rating
AllMusic	3/5 stars
Robert Christgau	(2-star Honorable Mention)
Los Angeles Times	2.5/4 stars
The Source	3/5 stars
XXL	L (3/5)

The Los Angeles Times wrote that "Forte excels with light-hearted subject matter and instrumentation." Rolling Stone concluded that "Forte displays a surer footing writing lyrics than he does on actual rapping; his vocal style flips between JayZ-ish Brooklynisms and the cool-pose sneers of Nas."

== Track listing ==
No.	Title	Writer(s)	Producer(s)	Length
1.	"Hot" (Intro)	John E. Forté	John Forté	2:26
2.	"They Got Me" (featuring Fat Joe and Destruct)	Forté; Joseph Cartagena; D. Phillips; Fernando Da Cruz	John Forté	4:51
3.	"Ninety Nine (Flash the Message)"	Forté; Jörn-Uwe Fahrenkrog-Petersen; Carlo Karges	Wyclef Jean; Pras; Jerry Duplessis (co.)	3:44
4.	"God Is Love God Is War"	Forté	John Forté	4:34
5.	"We Got This" (featuring DMX)	Forté; Earl Simmons; T. Jones	John Forté; Warren Riker	3:40
6.	"P.B.E. (Powerful, Beautiful, Excellent)"	Forté	John Forté	4:09
7.	"The Right One/Father to Son (Interlude)" (featuring Pras)	Forté; Samuel Michel; William Robinson, Jr.; Marvin Tarplin	John Forté	4:30
8.	"Madina Passage" (featuring Baracus, Casino Red, El Harim and St. Nikolas)	Forté; T. Jones; J. Williford; A. Footman; C. Michell; Jeni Fujita	John Forté	4:20
9.	"All You Gotta Do"	Forté; Ray Stewart	Minnesota	4:04
10.	"All Fucked Up"	Forté	John Forté	3:02
11.	"Poly Sci"	Forté; T. Jones	John Forté	5:22
12.	"Born to Win/Riddle of Steel (Interlude)"	Forté; Salaam Remi	Salaam Remi	4:24
13.	"Flash the Message"	Forté	John Forté	3:41
14.	"Hot" (Outro)	Forté	John Forté	2:22
Total length:				55:09

Sample credits

- Track 2 contains elements from "Petit Pays" written by Fernando Da Cruz and performed by Cesária Évora
- Track 3 contains elements from "Mash It Up" written by Joseph Williams & Lawrence Parker and performed by Just-Ice and resung elements from "99 Luftballons" written by Jörn-Uwe Fahrenkrog-Petersen & Carlo Karges and performed by Nena
- Track 7 contains elements from "Cruisin'" written by William Robinson & Marvin Tarplin and performed by Smokey Robinson

== Charts ==
Chart (1998)	Peak position
US Billboard 200	84
US Top R&B/Hip-Hop Albums (Billboard)	28
