= Charles Winters =

American businessman

Charles Thompson Winters (February 10, 1913 – October 29, 1984) was an American businessman who volunteered during the 1948 Arab–Israeli War. He was sentenced to 18 months in prison and fined $5,000 for violating the Neutrality Act of 1939 after helping smuggle three B-17 Flying Fortress heavy bombers to Israel in the late 1940s. Of the small handful of Americans prosecuted for aiding Israel in the 1948 war, only Winters served time in prison.

Winters received a posthumous pardon by President George W. Bush on December 23, 2008.

== Early life ==
Winters, the Protestant son of Scotch-Canadian and Irish parents, was born in Brookline, Massachusetts in 1913. Polio struck him at an early age, leaving him with a limp. Because of this handicap, the United States Army rejected him during World War II, and he instead spent the war working for the government as a purchasing agent.

== Smuggling ==
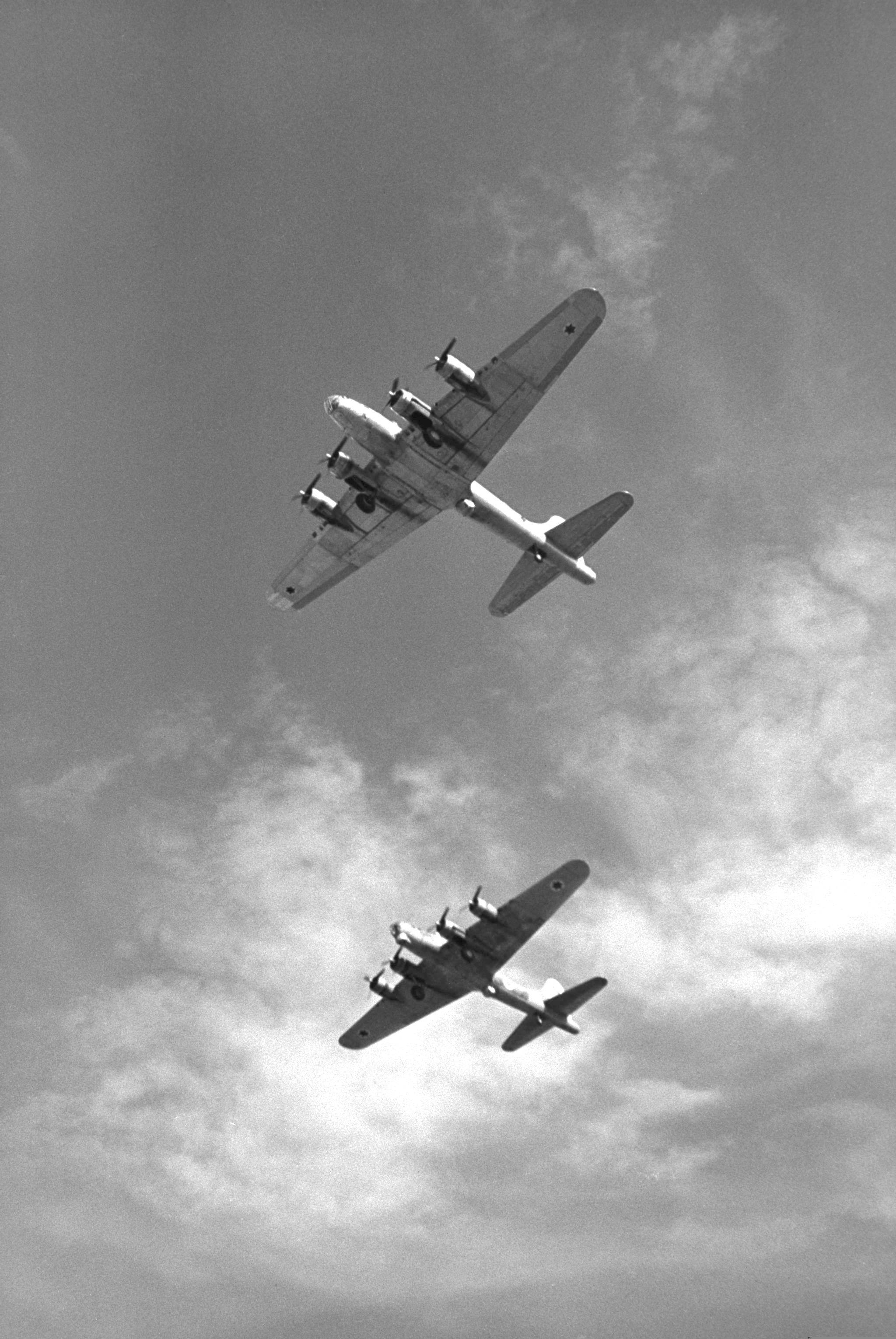
Israeli B-17s in flight, 1953

Winters entered the produce export business after the war, buying decommissioned military cargo planes that were being used to transport fruits and vegetables. A friend and flight engineer named Al Schwimmer, known as the father of the Israeli air force, enlisted Winters in his efforts to supply aircraft to Jewish fighters in Israel; with his government experience, Winters managed to smuggle three B-17 bombers to Israel. Taking off from Miami, the two B-17s refueled in Puerto Rico, as if completing a normal shipping route, but instead flew to Israel by way of the Azores and Czechoslovakia; a third B-17 joined the group in Czechoslovakia. They constituted the newly created Israeli Air Force's first heavy bombers. Winters was said to have decided to help supply the Israeli forces as a favor to his Jewish friends, and received no monetary compensation for the work.

The three bombers smuggled by Winters were the only heavy bombers in the Israeli Air Force during the war, but reportedly helped turned the tide of war in Israel's favor. In his diary on July 16, 1948, David Ben-Gurion noted their arrival in Israel, and mentioned that they had already been used for several bombing runs in Egypt. They formed 69 Squadron of the Israeli Air Force, known as the "Hammers".

Winters was subsequently prosecuted by the U.S. Attorney in Miami for violating the Neutrality Act of 1939 in conspiring to smuggle three bombers via Czechoslovakia to Palestine. He pleaded guilty and was sentenced to 18 months in prison and fined $5,000. Winters was released from prison on November 17, 1949. Schwimmer, while convicted, was not sentenced to prison, and was pardoned by President Bill Clinton in 2000. Another man in the operation, Herman Greenspun, was also convicted with no prison time, and pardoned in 1961 by President John F. Kennedy.

== Later life ==
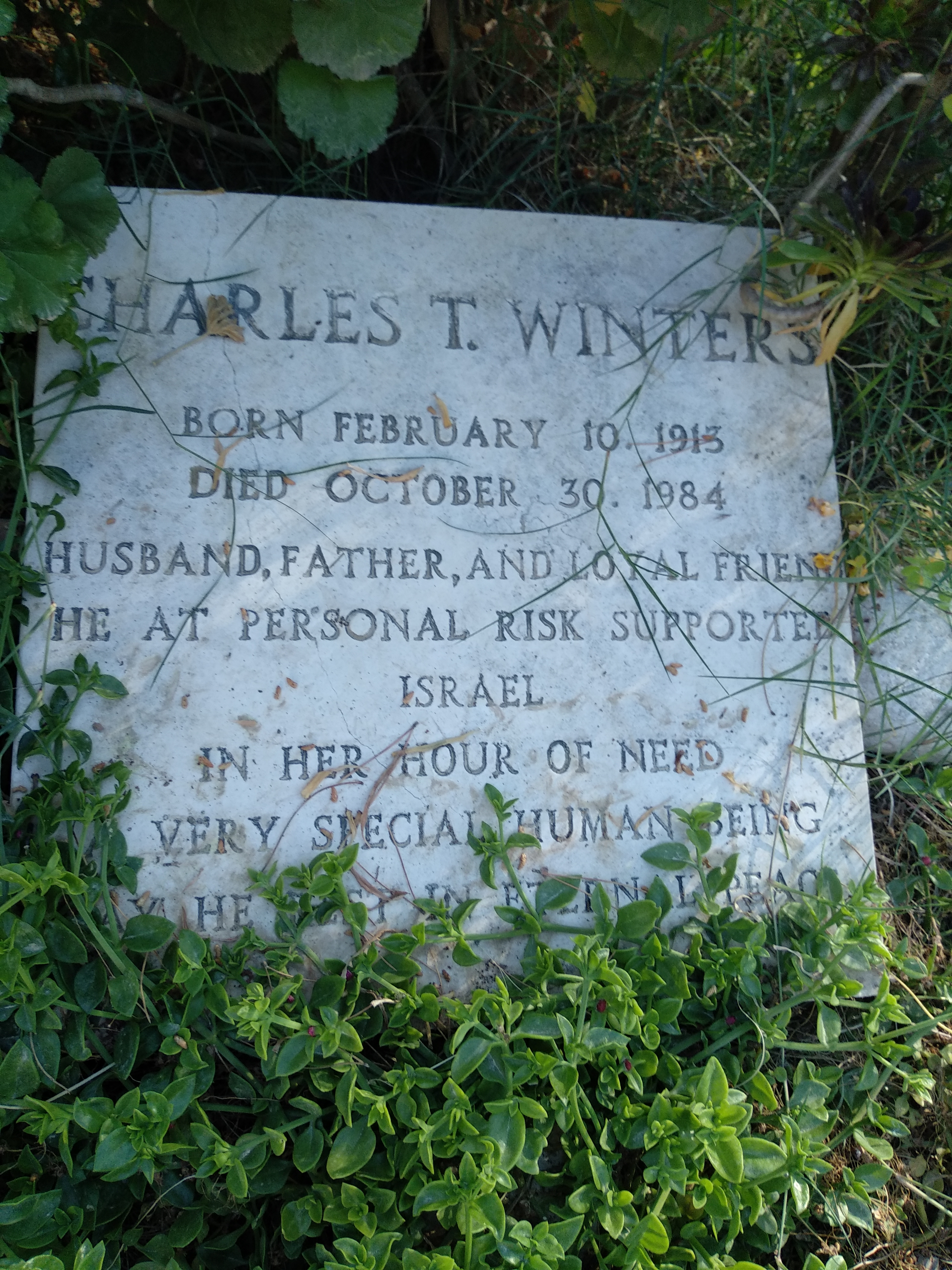
Gravestone of Charles Winters in Jerusalem

At the time of his death, Winters was married to the former Joan Babineau and had two children with her, Lisa and James (Jimi). His sons Charles Todd and Charles Jr. were from previous marriages. He never told his children about his smuggling or prison time, and his son Jimi recounted that the first hint he ever had of something in his father's past was when his father admitted to him that he couldn't buy a gun. In 1961 he received a letter from then Foreign Affairs Minister Golda Meir, commending him for his efforts and inviting him to the opening of a new memorial in Israel. Winters lived the rest of his life in Miami, where he founded an export firm. He died there October 30, 1984 and his ashes were buried in the Alliance International Cemetery in Jerusalem's "German Colony," next to Jerusalem's German Templar cemetery as well as scattered from Mount Tabor.

== Pardon ==
Winters' son James, along with his close childhood friend Frank Jimenez, began campaigning for his father's pardon after his death, receiving the support of, among others, 21 Congressmen, the American Jewish Committee, and Steven Spielberg. President Bush officially pardoned Winters on December 23, 2008. Democratic Representative Ron Klein, who led the congressional group, commented that "President Bush made the right decision today to issue a posthumous pardon to Charles Winters, a Florida resident who played an essential role in the creation of the state of Israel."

Winters' lawyer, Wilmer Hale partner Reginald Brown, stated, "He did a heroic thing and, at the time, the law didn't reflect our values. The pardon is a way of the law catching up with the history." His son James responded to the pardon, saying, "This is a present for my father...It was a monumental challenge, but my dad used to always say 'Keep the faith,' and we did". Winters' pardon constituted the first posthumous pardon since Henry Ossian Flipper in 1999.

== See also ==
- Sherut Avir
- Israeli Air Force
- List of people pardoned by George W. Bush
