= List of people pardoned by George W. Bush =

This is a list of people pardoned by George W. Bush. Bush, a Republican, served as the 43rd president of the United States from 2001 to 2009.

== Constitutional authority ==
The pardon powers of the president are outlined in Article Two of the United States Constitution (Section 2, Clause 1), which provides:

The President shall be Commander in Chief of the Army and Navy of the United States, and of the Militia of the several States, when called into the actual Service of the United States; he may require the Opinion, in writing, of the principal Officer in each of the executive Departments, upon any Subject relating to the Duties of their respective Offices, and he shall have Power to grant Reprieves and Pardons for Offenses against the United States, except in Cases of Impeachment.

== Definitions ==
- A pardon is an executive order granting clemency for a conviction, it may be granted "at any point after the...commission" of the crime. As per Justice Department regulations, convicted persons may only apply five or more years after their sentence has been completed. However, the president's power to pardon is not restricted by any temporal constraints except that the crime must have been committed. Its practical effect is the restoration of civil rights and statutory disabilities (i.e., firearm rights, occupational licensing) associated with a past criminal conviction. In rarer cases, such as the pardon of Richard Nixon, a pardon can also halt criminal proceedings and prevent an indictment.
- A commutation is the mitigation of the sentence of someone currently serving a sentence for a crime pursuant to a conviction, without vacating the conviction itself.

== List of people pardoned or granted clemency by the president of the United States ==
A list of people pardoned or granted clemency by the president of the United States, ordered by date of pardon or commutation, is available here: List of people pardoned or granted clemency by the president of the United States.

== Pardons issued by George W. Bush ==
=== December 20, 2002 ===
Name	District	Sentenced	Offense
Kenneth Franklin Copley	M. D. Tenn.	1962	Manufacturing untaxed whiskey, 26 U.S.C. §§ 5173, 5179, 5205, 5222, 5601, and 5604.
Harlan Paul Dobas	W. D. Wash.	1966	Conspiracy, 18 U.S.C. § 371.
Stephen James Jackson	E. D. La.	1993	Altering the odometer of a motor vehicle, 15 U.S.C. §§ 1984 and 1990(c)(A).
Douglas Harley Rogers	E. D. Wis.	1957	Failure to submit to induction into the Armed Forces of the United States; 50 App. U.S.C. § 451 et seq.
Walter Fred Schuerer	N. D. Iowa.	1989	Making a false statement to the Social Security Administration regarding his employment; 18 U.S.C. § 1001.
Paul Herman Wieser	W. D. Wash.	1972	Theft from an interstate shipment, 18 U.S.C. § 695.
Olgen Williams	S. D. Ind.	1971	Theft from the mail by a postal employee, iou 18 U.S.C. § 1709.

=== November 5, 2003 ===
Name	District	Sentenced	Offense
Bruce Louis Bartos	S. D. Fla.	1987	Transportation of a machine gun in foreign commerce, 18 U.S.C. §§ 922(a)(4) and 924.
Brianna Lea Haney	W. D. Wash.	1991	Failure to report monetary instruments, 31 U.S.C. §§ 5316 and 5322(a).
David Custer Heaston	D. Nev.	1988	False statement, 18 U.S.C. § 1001.
Michael Robert Moelter	W. D. Wis.	1988	Conducting an illegal gambling business, 18 U.S.C. § 1955.

=== February 14, 2004 ===
Name	District	Sentenced	Offense
David B. McCall, Jr.	E. D. Tex.	1997	False entry in bank books and aiding and abetting, 18 U.S.C. §§ 1006 and 2.

=== May 20, 2004 ===
Name	District	Sentenced	Offense
Paul Jude Donnici	W. D. Mo.	1993	Use of a telephone in the transmission of wagering information, 18 U.S.C. § 1084.
Samuel Wattie Guerry	D. So. Car.	1994	Food stamp fraud, 7 U.S.C. § 2024(b).
Charles E. Hamilton	W. D. Wash.	1989	Mail fraud, 18 U.S.C. §§ 1341 and 2.
Kenneth Lynn Norris	W. D. Okla.	1993	Unlawful disposal of hazardous waste, 42 U.S.C. § 6928(d)(2)(A) and 18 U.S.C. § 2.
Johnson Heyward Tisdale	D. So. Car.	1994	Food stamp fraud, 7 U.S.C. § 2024(b).

=== July 6, 2004 ===
Name	District	Sentenced	Offense
Anthony John Curreri	E. D. Wis.	1976	Mail fraud, 18 U.S.C. § 1341.
Craven Wilford McLemore	W. D. Okla.	1983	Conspiracy to defraud the United States and Caddo County, 18 U.S.C. § 371.

=== November 17, 2004 ===
Name	District	Sentenced	Offense
Meredith Elizabeth Casares	D. Kan.	1989	Embezzlement of U.S. Postal Service funds, 18 U.S.C. § 641.
Gerald Douglas Ficke	D. Neb.	1992	Structuring currency transactions to evade reporting requirements, 31 U.S.C. §§ 5324(3) and 5322(a) and 18 U.S.C. § 2.
Richard Arthur Morse	S. D. Miss.	1963	Interstate transportation of a stolen motor vehicle, 18 U.S.C. § 2312.
Fred Dale Pitzer	S. D. Ohio	1976	Interstate transportation of falsely made securities, 18 U.S.C. § 2314.
Cecil John Rhodes	N. D. Tex	1981	Making a materially false statement in a loan application to a federally insured bank, 18 U.S.C. § 1014.
Russell Don Sell	D. Kan.	1995	Aiding and abetting the making of a false statement to a credit institution, 18 U.S.C. §§ 1014 and 2.

=== December 21, 2004 ===
Name	District	Sentenced	Offense
Kristan Diane Akins, fka Kristan Diane Bullock and Kristan D. Wheeler	E. D. No. Car.	1990	Embezzlement by a bank employee, 18 U.S.C. § 656.
Ronald William Cauley	D. Rhode Island	1980	Misapplication of bank funds by an employee, 18 U.S.C. § 657.
Stephen Davis Simmons	W. D. Tex.	1981	Possession of counterfeit obligations, 18 U.S.C. § 472.
Roger Charles Weber	C. D. Calif.	1969	Theft from an interstate shipment, 18 U.S.C. § 659.

=== March 3, 2005 ===
Name	District	Sentenced	Offense
Alan Dale Austin	W. D. Tex.	1987	Misapplication of mortgage funds, 18 U.S.C. § 657.
Charles Russell Cooper	D. So. Car.	1959	Bootlegging, 26 U.S.C. §§ 5174a, 5605, 5632, and 5681.
Joseph Daniel Gavin	U.S. Army general court-martial	1984	Failure to obey an order, drunk and disorderly in quarters, communicating a threat, disrespect to a superior commissioned officer, assault, damage to government property, resisting apprehension, Articles 89, 92, 95, 108, 128, and 134, UCMJ.
Raul Marin	W. D. Tex.	1982	Failure to appear, 18 U.S.C. § 3150.
Ernest Rudnet	E. D. N. Y.	1992	Conspiracy to file false tax returns, 18 U.S.C. § 371.
Gary L. Saltzburg	D. New Mex.	1995	Theft of government property, 18 U.S.C. § 641.
David Lloyd St. Croix	D. No. Dak.	1989	Disposing of stolen explosives, 18 U.S.C. §§ 842(h) and 844(a).
Joseph William Warner	D. So. Dak.	1995	Arson, 18 U.S.C. §§ 1152 and 81.

=== June 8, 2005 ===
Name	District	Sentenced	Offense
David Thomas Billmyer	U.S. Air Force special court-martial	1978 (approved in 1979)	Making a false claim, Article 132, UCMJ.
William Charles Davis	M. D. Fla.	1983	Income tax evasion, 26 U.S.C. § 7201.
Richard Ardell Krueger	D. So. Car. D. So. Car.	1979; 1980	Mail fraud, 18 U.S.C. § 1341. Furnishing false information on a Housing and Urban Development loan application, 18 U.S.C. § 1010.
Michael Mark McLaughlin	D. New Hamp.	1983 (sentence modified in 1984)	Conspiracy to commit mail fraud and mail fraud, 18 U.S.C. §§ 2, 371, and 1341.
Billie Curtis Moore	E. D. Mich.	1977	Income tax evasion, 26 U.S.C. § 7201.
James Edward Reed	N. D. Tex.	1975	Conspiracy to possess with intent to distribute marijuana, 21 U.S.C. § 846.
Scott LaVerne Sparks	D. So. Car.	1989	Theft of government property, 18 U.S.C. § 641.

=== September 28, 2005 ===
Name	District	Sentenced	Offense
Gene Armand Bridger	W. D. Mich.	1963	Conspiracy to commit mail fraud and mail fraud, 18 U.S.C. §§ 2, 371, 1341.
Cathryn Iline Clasen-Gage	N. D. Tex.	1992	Misprision of felony, 18 U.S.C. § 4.
Thomas Kimble Collinsworth	W. D. Ark.	1989	Receipt of a stolen motor vehicle transported in interstate commerce, 18 U.S.C. § 2313.
Morris F. Cranmer, Jr.	E. D. Ark.	1988	Making materially false statements to a federally insured lending institution, 18 U.S.C. § 1014.
Rusty Lawrence Elliott	W. D. Mo.	1991	Making counterfeit Federal Reserve notes, 18 U.S.C. § 471.
Adam Wade Graham	D. Wyo.	1992	Conspiracy to deliver 10 or more grams of LSD, 21 U.S.C. §§ 841(a)(1), 841(b)(1)(A)(v), and 846.
Rufus Edward Harris	1. M. D. Ga.; 2. N. D. Ga.	1. 1963; 2. 1970	1. Possession of tax-unpaid whiskey, 26 U.S.C. §§ 5205 and 2604.; 2. Possession and selling tax-unpaid whiskey, 26 U.S.C. §§ 5601, 5604, and 5205.
Jesse Ray Harvey	S. D. W. Va.	1990	Property damage by use of explosives and destruction of an energy facility, 18 U.S.C. §§ 844(i) and 1366(a).
Larry Paul Lenius	D. No. Dak.	1989	Conspiracy to distribute cocaine, 21 U.S.C. § 846.
Larry Lee Lopez	M. D. Fla.	1985	Conspiracy to import marijuana, 21 U.S.C. §§ 952 and 953.
Bobbie Archie Maxwell	M. D. Ga.	1962	Mailing a threatening letter, 18 U.S.C. § 876.
Denise Bitters Mendelkow	D. Utah	1981	Embezzlement by a bank employee, 18 U.S.C. § 656.
Michael John Pozorski	W. D. Wis.	1988	Unlawful possession of an unregistered firearm, 26 U.S.C. §§ 5861(d) and 5871.
Mark Lewis Weber	U.S. Air Force general court-martial	1981	Selling Quaalude tablets (one specification) and selling, using, and possessing marijuana (three specifications), Articles 92 and 134, UCMJ.

=== December 20, 2005 ===
Name	District	Sentenced	Offense
Carl Eugene Cantrell	E. D. Tenn.	1967	Violation of Internal Revenue Service liquor laws, 26 U.S.C. §§ 2601 et seq.
Charles Winston Carter	S. (now Central) D. Ill.	1964	Conspiracy to steal property of the United States, 18 U.S.C. §§ 371 and 641.
Harper James Finucan	D. So. Car.	1980	Possession with intent to distribute marijuana, 21 U.S.C. 841|a|1.
Bobby Frank Kay, Sr.	E. D. Va.	1959	Operation of an illegal distillery, 26 U.S.C. §§ 5174, 5606, 5216, 5686(b), and 7302.
Melvin L. McKee	D. Nev.	1982	Conspiracy to make and cause the making of false statements in loan applications; aiding and abetting the making of a materially false statement in a loan application, 18 U.S.C. §§ 371, 1014, and 2.
Charles Elis McKinley	M. D. Tenn.	1950	Violation of Internal Revenue Service liquor laws, 26 U.S.C. § 1185 (as in effect in 1950).
Donald Lee Pendergrass	S. D. Calif.	1964	Bank robbery by use of a dangerous weapon, 18 U.S.C. §§ 2113(a) and d.
Charles Blurford Power	N. D. Ga.	1948	Interstate transportation of a stolen motor vehicle, 18 U.S.C. §408 (1940 edition).
John Gregory Schillace	E. D. La.	1988	Conspiracy to possess cocaine with intent to distribute, 21 U.S.C. § 846.
Wendy Rose St. Charles, fka Wendy Rose St. Charles Holmes	N. D. Ill.	1984	Conspiracy to conduct a narcotics enterprise, and distribution of cocaine, 18 U.S.C. § 1962(d) and 21 U.S.C. § 841(a)(1).
Jimmy Lee Williams	N. D. Tex.	1995	False statement on a loan application, 18 U.S.C. § 1014.

=== April 18, 2006 ===
Name	District	Sentenced	Offense
Patrick Harold Ackerman	D. Ore.	1980	Filing false statements, 18 U.S.C. § 1001.
Karen Marie Edmonson	D. Minn.	1978	Distribution of methamphetamine, 21 U.S.C. § 841(a)(1).
Anthony Americo Franchi	D. Mass.	1983	Income tax evasion, 26 U.S.C. § 7201.
Timothy Mark Freudenthal	E. D. Wis.	1985	Conspiracy to introduce imported merchandise into commerce of the United States, 18 U.S.C. § 371.
George Anderson Glenn	U.S. Army general court-martial	1956	Conspiracy to commit larceny and larceny, Articles 81 and 121, UCMJ
Mark Reuben Hale	E. D. Tex.	1991	Savings and Loan fraud, 18 U.S.C. § 1344.
Kenneth Ward Hill	N. D. Miss.	1992	Attempted tax evasion, 26 U.S.C. § 7201.
Margaret Ann Leggett	E. D. Ark.	1981	Conspiracy to defraud the United States by making false claims for income tax refunds, 18 U.S.C. § 286.
Elke Margarethe Mikaelian	D. New Mex.	1993	Misprision of felony, 18 U.S.C. § 4.
Karl Bruce Weber	N. D. Fla.	1985	Possession of cocaine with intent to distribute, 21 U.S.C. § 841(a)(1).
Carl Manar White	E. D. Okla.	1983	Conspiracy to defraud the United States and Pittsburgh County, Oklahoma, by tax evasion and mail fraud, 18 U.S.C. § 371.

=== August 16, 2006 ===
Department of Justice Immediate Release

Name	District	Sentenced	Offense
James Leon Adams	D. So. Car.	1976	Selling firearms to out-of-state residents and falsifying firearms records, 18 U.S.C. §§ 922(b)(3), 922(m), and 924(a).
Tony Dale Ashworth	D. So. Car.	1989	Unlawful transfer of a firearm, 26 U.S.C. §§ 5861(e) and 5871.
Randall Leece Deal	1. N. D. Ga.; 2. N. D. Ga; 3. N. D. Ga.	1. 1960; 2. 1964; 3. 1964	1. Liquor law violation, 26 U.S.C.; 2. Liquor law violation, 26 U.S.C.; 3. Conspiracy to violate the liquor laws, 26 U.S.C.
William Henry Eagle	E. D. Ark.	1972	Possessing an unregistered still, carrying on the business of a distiller without giving the required bond, and manufacturing mash on other than lawfully qualified premises, 26 U.S.C. §§ 5601(a)(1), 5601(a)(4), and 5601(a)(7).
Robert Carter Eversole	E. D. Tenn.	1984	Conspiracy to commit theft from an interstate shipment, 18 U.S.C. § 371.
Kenneth Clifford Foner	D. Neb.	1991	Conspiracy to impede functions of the FDIC, commit embezzlement as a bank officer, make false entries in the records of an FDIC-insured bank, and commit bank fraud, 18 U.S.C. §§ 371, 656, 1005, and 1344.
Victoria Diane Frost	W. D. N. Y.	1994	Conspiracy to possess and distribute L-ephedrine hydrochloride, 21 U.S.C. § 846.
William Grover Frye	1. U.S. Army general court-martial 2. S. D. Ind.	1. 1968; 2. 1973	1. Absence without leave (two specifications), Article 86, UCMJ (10 U.S.C. § 886), and escape from lawful confinement, Article 95, UCMJ (10 U.S.C. § 895).; 2. Sale of a stolen motor vehicle moving in interstate commerce, 18 U.S.C. § 2313.
Stanley Bernard Hamilton	S. D. Miss.	1990	Altering U.S. postal money orders, 18 U.S.C. § 500.
Melodie Jean Hebert	D. Rhode Island	1984	Conspiracy to defraud the United States by making false claims, 18 U.S.C. §§ 371 and 1001.
James Ernest Kinard, Jr.	D. So. Car.	1984	Failure by a licensed firearms dealer to make appropriate entries in firearms records required to be kept by law (four counts), making false entries by a licensed firearms dealer in firearms records required to be made by law, 18 U.S.C. §§ 922(m) and 2.
Devin Timothy Kruse	U.S. Coast Guard special court-martial	1978	Unauthorized absence, Article 86, UCMJ (10 U.S.C. § 886).
Gerard Murphy	M. D. Fla.	1972	Theft of a motor vehicle from a U.S. Air Force base, 18 U.S.C. §§ 7 and 13.
Joseph Matthew Novak	N. D. Ohio	1994	Possession and transfer of an illegal weapon, 18 U.S.C. §§ 922(o)(1) and 924(a)(2).
John Louis Ribando	1. C. D. Calif.; 2. C. D. Calif.	1. 1976; 2. 1978	1. Possession with intent to distribute a controlled substance (marijuana), 21 U.S.C. §§ 841(a)(1).; 2. Conspiracy to possess with intent to distribute a controlled substance (marijuana), and importing a controlled substance (marijuana), 21 U.S.C. §§ 841(a)(1), 846, 952(a), 960(a)(1), and 963.
Edward Rodriguez Trevino, Jr.	U.S. Navy special court-martial	1997	Larceny, Article 121, UCMJ (10 U.S.C. § 921).
Jerry Dean Walker	W. D. No. Car.	1989	Possession with intent to distribute cocaine, 21 U.S.C. § 841(a)(1).

=== December 21, 2006 ===
Name	District	Sentenced	Offense
Charles James Allen	D. Md.	1979	Conspiracy to defraud the United States, 18 U.S.C. § 371.
William Sidney Baldwin, Sr.	D. So. Car.	1981	Conspiracy to possess marijuana, 21 U.S.C. § 846.
Timothy Evans Barfield	E. D. No. Car.	1989	Aiding and abetting false statements in a Small Business Administration loan application, 15 U.S.C. § 645(a) and 18 U.S.C. § 2.
Clyde Philip Boudreaux	U.S. Navy general court-martial	1975	Borrowing money from enlisted men, accepting a non-interest-bearing loan from a government contractor, and swearing to a false affidavit, Articles 92, 107, 134, UCMJ.
Marie Georgette Ginette Briere	D. P. R.	1982	Possession of cocaine with intent to distribute, 21 U.S.C. § 841(a)(1).
Dale C. Critz, Jr.	M. D. Fla.	1989	Making a false statement, 18 U.S.C. § 1001.
Mark Allen Eberwine	W. D. Tex.	1985 (as amended in 1986)	Conspiracy to defraud the United States by impeding, impairing, and obstructing the assessment of taxes by the Internal Revenue Service, 18 U.S.C. § 371; false declaration to the grand jury, 18 U.S.C. § 1623.
Colin Earl Francis	D. Conn.	1993	Accepting a kickback, 41 U.S.C. §§ 53 and 54.
George Thomas Harley	D. New Mex.	1984	Aiding and abetting the distribution of cocaine, 21 U.S.C. § 841(a)(1) and 18 U.S.C. § 2
Patricia Ann Hultman	W. D. Pa.	1985	Conspiracy to possess with intent to distribute and to distribute cocaine, 21 U.S.C. 846.
Eric William Olson	U.S. Army general court-martial	1984	Conspiracy to possess with intent to distribute, possession with intent to distribute, possession of, and use of hashish, Articles 81 and 134, UCMJ.
Thomas R. Reece	N. D. Ga.	1969	Violating the Internal Revenue Code pertaining to alcohol, 26 U.S.C. § 5681(c).
Larry Gene Ross	D. Wyo.	1989	Making false statements in a bank loan application, 18 U.S.C. § 1014.
Jearld David Swanner	W. D. Okla.	1991	Making false statements in a bank loan application, 18 U.S.C. § 1005.
James Walter Taylor	E. D. Ark.	1991	Bank fraud, 18 U.S.C. § 1344.
Janet Theone Upton	D. Nev.	1975	Mail fraud, 18 U.S.C. § 1341.

=== December 10, 2007 ===
Name	District	Sentenced	Offense
James Albert Bodendieck, Sr.	S. D. Ill.	1959	Interstate transportation of a stolen vehicle, 18 U.S.C. § 2312.
Jeffrey James Bruce	D. Haw.	1994	Possession of stolen mail, 18 U.S.C. § 1708.
Charles Wayne Bryant	N. D. Ga.	1962	Theft of United States mail by employee, 18 U.S.C. § 1709.
Carleton Gregory Carpenter	M. D. Fla	1981	Making a false representation with respect to information required to be kept in the records of a person holding a federal firearms license, 18 U.S.C. §§ 2 and 924(a).
John Edward Casto	N. D. W. Va.	1990	Distribution of cocaine, 21 U.S.C. § 841(a)(1).
Jackie Ray Clayborn	W. D. Ark.	1993	Manufacturing marijuana, 21 U.S.C. § 841(b)(1)(D).
Debbie Sue Conklin fka Debbie Sue McAlevy	D. Neb.	1990	Conspiracy to distribute methamphetamine, 21 U.S.C. §§ 846 and 841(a)(1).
Charles Richard Fennell	C. D. Calif.	1995	False statement to a federally insured financial institution, 18 U.S.C. § 1014.
John Fornaby	S. D. Fla.	1991	Conspiracy to distribute cocaine, 21 U.S.C. § 846.
Daniel Ray Freeman	S. D. Ga.	1963	Violation of Internal Revenue Service liquor laws, 26 U.S.C. §§ 5205(a)(2) and 5604(a)(1).
Thomas Dee Gandy	N. D. Tex.	1996	Mail fraud affecting a financial institution, 18 U.S.C. § 1341.
Melton Harrell	N. D. Ga.	1976	Theft of government property and receiving stolen government property, 18 U.S.C. § 641.
Paul Dwight Hawkins	M. D. Fla.	1990	Conspiracy to import marijuana, 21 U.S.C. § 963.
Roger Paul Ingram	W. D. Tex.	1987	Conspiracy to possess with intent to distribute an analogue of a Schedule I controlled substance, 3,4 methylenedioxymethamphetamine (ecstasy), 21 U.S.C. §§ 813, 841(a)(1), and 846.
William Lucius Jones, Jr.	N. D. Ala.	1972	Illegal possession of an unregistered firearm, 26 U.S.C. § 5861(d).
William Charles Jordan, Jr.	M. D. Pa.	2000	Managing and conducting an illegal gambling business, 18 U.S.C. § 1955.
Saul Kaplan	M. D. Pa.	1992	Violation of the Federal Election Campaign Act, 2 U.S.C. §§ 437g|d|1|A and 441a|1|A.
Billy Joe LaForce	S. D. Tex.	1991	Conspiracy to possess marijuana with intent to distribute, 21 U.S.C. §§ 846, 841(a)(1), and 841(b)(1)(D).
Rudolph J. Macejak	N. D. Ill.	1986	Possession of an unregistered firearm, 26 U.S.C. §§ 5861(d) and i.
John F. McDermott	D. Mass.	1995	Receiving kickbacks in defense procurement contracts, 41 U.S.C. §§ 51-54 and 18 U.S.C. § 2.
William James Norman	S. D. Ga.	1970	Possession of an unregistered distillery, 26 U.S.C. §§ 5179 and 5601(a)(1); carrying on the business of a distiller without giving the required bond, 26 U.S.C. § 5601|a; possession and custody of a still without the required sign outside the premises, 26 U.S.C. § 5180; working at a distillery without the required sign outside the premises, 26 U.S.C. §§ 5180 and 5681(c); unlawfully producing distilled spirits from mash and similar material, 26 U.S.C. §§ 5601(a)(8) and 5222.
Glanus Terrell Osborne	S. D. Ga.	1990	Possession of a stolen motor vehicle, 18 U.S.C. § 2313.
John Gordon Smith	N. D. Tex.	1988	False statement to a federal agency, 18 U.S.C. § 1001.
Walter J. Sweeney, III	S. D. Ohio	1993	Attempting to evade income taxes, 26 U.S.C. § 7201.
Nancy Lynn Thompson	N. D. Fla.	1997	Embezzlement by a bank employee, 18 U.S.C. § 656.
Daryl Toney	M. D. Ga.	1993	Misdemeanor theft within the Special Maritime and Territorial Jurisdiction of the United States, 18 U.S.C. § 641.
Charles Eddie Trobaugh	M. D. Tenn.	1965	Liquor law violations, 26 U.S.C. §§ 5179(a), 5601(a)(1), 5222, 5601(a)(7), and 5604(a)(1).
Samuel Lewis Whisel	M. D. Pa.	1989	Aiding and abetting the interstate transportation of stolen goods, 18 U.S.C. §§ 2314 and 2.
Steven Wayne Whitlock	M. D. Fla	1990	Conspiracy to import marijuana, 21 U.S.C. §§ 952, 960(b)(1)(G), and 963.

=== March 24, 2008 ===
Name	District	Sentenced	Offense
William L. Baker	D. Wyo.	1980	Distribution of a controlled substance, 21 U.S.C. §§ 841|a|1, 841|b|2; falsifying records, 21 U.S.C. §§ 827(a)(3), 843(a)(4).
George Francis Bauckham	D. N. J.	1958	Unlawful detention, delay and secretion of mail by postal employee; 18 U.S.C. § 1703(a).
Kenneth Charles Britt	D. Kan.	1998	Conspiracy to violate federal and state fish and wildlife laws; 18 U.S.C. § 371.
William Bruce Butt	E. D. Ky.	1990	Bank embezzlement; 18 U.S.C. § 656.
Mariano Garza Caballero	S. D. Tex.	1984	Dealing in firearms without a federal firearms license; 18 U.S.C. §§ 922(a)(1) and 2.
Anthony C. Foglio aka Tony Foley	N. D. W. Va.	1996	Distribution of marijuana; 21 U.S.C. § 841(a)(1).
Marvin Robert Foster	D. Rhode Island	1968	False statement in connection with a Federal Housing Administration loan; 18 U.S.C. § 1010.
Carl Harry Hachmeister	D. Utah	1985	Conspiracy (to commit wire and mail fraud); 18 U.S.C. § 371.
William Marcus McDonald	U.S. Air Force general court-martial	1984	Distribution of cocaine, possession of cocaine with intent to distribute, use of cocaine, possession of cocaine, use of marijuana; Article 134, U.C.M.J.
Robert Michael Milroy	E. D. Va.	1975	Importation of heroin; 21 U.S.C. §§ 960(a)(1), 952(a), and 843(b).
Jerry Lynn Moldenhauer	D. Col.	1994	Knowingly selling migratory bird parts in violation of Migratory Bird Treaty Act; 16 U.S.C. §§ 703 and 707(b).
Thomas Donald Moldenhauer	D. Col.	1994	Knowingly selling migratory bird parts in violation of Migratory Bird Treaty Act; 16 U.S.C. §§ 703 and 707(b).
Richard James Putney, aka Richard James Putney, Jr.	N. D. W. Va.	1996	Aiding and abetting the escape of a prisoner; 18 U.S.C. §§ 752(a) and 2.
Timothy Alfred Thone	D. Minn.	1987	Making a false statement to the Department of Housing and Urban Development to obtain a mortgage loan; 18 U.S.C. § 1010.
Lonnie Edward Two Eagle, Sr.	D. S. Dak.	1976	Simple assault committed on an Indian reservation (misdemeanor); 18 U.S.C. §§ 1153 and 113(e), now 18 U.S.C. § 113(a)(5), as re-numbered and amended.

=== November 24, 2008 ===
Name	District	Sentenced	Offense
Leslie Owen Collier	E. D. Mo.	1996	Unauthorized use of a registered pesticide, 7 U.S.C. §§ 136(j)(a)(2)(F) and 136(l)(b); violation of the Bald and Golden Eagle Protection Act, 16 U.S.C. § 668(a).
Milton Kirk Cordes	D. So. Dak.	1998	Conspiracy to violate the Lacey Act; 18 U.S.C. § 371, 16 U.S.C. §§ 3372(a)(2)(A), 3373(d)(1)(B).
Richard Micheal Culpepper	C. D. Ill.	1988	False statements to the United States; 18 U.S.C. § 287.: 1. William Charles Davis (1983 income tax evasion)
Brenda Jean Dolenz-Helmer	N. D. Tex	1998	Misprision of a felony; 18 U.S.C. § 4.
Andrew Foster Harley	U.S. Air Force general court-martial	1985	Wrongful use and distribution of marijuana and cocaine; Article 112a, Uniform Code of Military Justice.
Obie Gene Helton	E. D. Tenn.	1983	Unauthorized acquisition of food stamps; 7 U.S.C. § 2024(b), 18 U.S.C. § 2.
Carey C. Hice, Sr.	D. So. Car.	1996	Income tax evasion; 26 U.S.C. § 7201 and 18 U.S.C. § 2.
Geneva Yvonne Hogg	D. So. Car.	1980	Bank embezzlement; 18 U.S.C. § 657.
William Hoyle McCright, Jr.	W. D. Tex.	1986	Making false entries, books, reports or statements of bank; 18 U.S.C. § 1005.
Paul Julian McCurdy	E. D. Okla.	1988	Misapplication of bank funds by a bank officer; 18 U.S.C. § 656.
Robert Earl Mohon, Jr.	N. D. Ala.	1987	Conspiracy to distribute marijuana; 21 U.S.C. §§ 841 and 846.
Ronald Alan Mohrhoff	C. D. Calif.	1984	Unlawful use of a telephone in furtherance of a narcotics felony, 21 U.S.C. § 843(b); possession of cocaine, 21 U.S.C. § 844(a).
Daniel Figh Pue, III	S. D. Tex.	1996	Illegal treatment, storage, and disposal of a hazardous waste without a permit, 42 U.S.C. § 6928(d)(2)(A); illegal transportation of a hazardous waste to an unpermitted facility for storage or disposal, 42 U.S.C. § 6928(d)(1).
Orion Lynn Vick	D. Ariz.	1975	Aiding and abetting the theft of government property; 18 U.S.C. §§ 641 and 2.

=== January 1, 2009 ===
Name	District	Sentenced	Offense
William Thomas Alvis, III	N. D. W. Va.	1990	Possession of an unregistered firearm, 26 U.S.C. § 5861; distribution of cocaine, 21 U.S.C. § 841(a)(1).
John Allen Aregood	S. D. Tex.	1996	Conspiracy to harbor and transport illegal aliens; 18 U.S.C. § 371, 8 U.S.C. § 1324|a|1|A(ii)(iii).
Eric Charles Blanke	S. D. Calif.	1995	Making impressions of obligations of the United States; 18 U.S.C. § 474.
Steven Doyle Cavender	N. D. Ala.	1973	Conspiring to import, possess, distribute and dispense marijuana; importing and causing to be imported marijuana; possessing marijuana with intent to distribute; 18 U.S.C. § 371, 21 U.S.C. §§ 841(a)(1), 952(a).
Marie Elena Eppens	D. Neb.	1992	Conspiracy to distribute and to possess with intent to distribute marijuana; 18 U.S.C. § 846.
Lydia Lee Ferguson	D. Ariz.	1990	Aiding and abetting possession of stolen mail; 18 U.S.C. §§ 1708 and 2.
Eduviges Duvi Gonzalez-Matsumura	C. D. Calif.	1993	Aiding and abetting embezzlement of bank funds; 18 U.S.C. §§ 656 and 2.
George Clarence Greene, Jr.	N. D. Ga.	1985	Mail fraud; 18 U.S.C. §§ 1341 and 2.
James Won Hee Kang	N. D. Ill.	1985	Trafficking in counterfeit goods; 18 U.S.C. § 2320.
Alan Stephen Maiss	E. D. La.	1995	Misprision of a felony; 18 U.S.C. § 4.
Richard Harold Miller	N. D. Fla.	1993	Conspiracy to defraud the United States; 18 U.S.C. § 371.
Delano Abraham Nixon	D. Kan.	1962	Forging the endorsement on a U.S. Treasury check; 18 U.S.C. § 495.
John H. Overholt	D. So. Dak.	1998	Concealment of information affecting Social Security benefits; 42 U.S.C. § 408(a)(4).
Morris Keith Parker	D. So. Car.	1991	Misprision of a felony; 18 U.S.C. § 4.
Robert Truman Reece	1. & 2. U.S. Navy summary courts-martial 3. U.S. Navy summary court-martial	1949; 1950	1. & 2. Unauthorized absence.; 3. Unauthorized absence; missing ship's movement.
Donald Edward Roessler	S. D. Ohio	1971	Embezzlement of mail matter by a postal employee; 18 U.S.C. § 1709.
Charles Thompson Winters	S. D. Fla.	1949	Conspiracy to illegally export, and illegal exportation, of a military aircraft to a foreign country; 18 U.S.C. §§ 88 (1946 ed.) and 371, 22 U.S.C. § 452, and Presidential Proclamation 2776 (dated March 26, 1948).
Issac Robert Toussie			False statements to the U.S. Department of Housing and Urban Development, mail fraud; revoked one day later) (Note: Issac Robert Toussie (False statements to the U.S. Department of Housing and Urban Development, mail fraud) George W. Bush revoked his pardon after discovering Issac Robert Toussie's father donated US$28,500 to the Republican Party in April.)
David Lane Woolsey	D. Utah	1992	Archaeological Resources Protection Act violation; 16 U.S.C. § 470ee(a) and 18 U.S.C. § 2.

== Commutations issued by George W. Bush ==
2016 video of Phillip Emmert discussing his 2006 commutation

1. Bobby Mac Berry, May 20, 2004 (Conspiracy to manufacture and possess with intent to manufacture marijuana, money laundering)
2. Geraldine Gordon, May 20, 2004 (Conspiracy to distribute phencyclidine, distribution of phencyclidine)
3. Phillip Anthony Emmert, December 21, 2006 (Conspiracy to distribute methamphetamine)
4. Lewis Libby, July 2, 2007 in connect to the Valerie Plame affair (one count of obstruction of justice; two counts of perjury; and one count of making false statements to federal investigators)
5. Michael Dwayne Short, December 10, 2007 (Aiding and abetting the distribution of cocaine base)
6. Patricia Beckford, March 24, 2008 (Conspiracy and attempt to distribute in excess of 50 grams of crack cocaine)
7. John Forté, November 24, 2008 (possession with intent to distribute cocaine and conspiracy to distribute)
8. James Russell Harris, November 24, 2008 (convicted in 1993 of cocaine conspiracy, money laundering and bribery)
9. Reed Raymond Prior of Des Moines, Iowa, December 23, 2008 (possession of methamphetamine with intent to distribute)
10. Ignacio Ramos, January 19, 2009 (2006 Shooting and wounding admitted and later convicted drug smuggler Osvaldo Aldrete Dávila and trying to cover up the incident)
11. Jose Compean, January 19, 2009 (2006 Shooting and wounding admitted and later convicted drug smuggler Osvaldo Aldrete Dávila and trying to cover up the incident)

== Commutation issued by George W. Bush as Governor of Texas ==
- Henry Lee Lucas – serial killer convicted of 11 homicides

== See also ==
- Federal pardons in the United States
- List of people pardoned or granted clemency by the president of the United States
- List of people pardoned by George H. W. Bush
- List of people pardoned by Bill Clinton
- List of people granted executive clemency by Barack Obama

== Sources ==
- United States Department of Justice, Office of the Pardon Attorney Pardons Granted by President Bush
- President Grants Pardons To 11, The Washington Post, (December 24, 2005)
- Hot Springs Woman Pardoned By President Bush Associated Press, (April 19, 2006)
- Massachusetts man among eleven pardoned by Bush Eyewitness News, (April 19, 2006)
- "Washington: Bush Pardons 11". The New York Times. April 19, 2006.
- President Pardons 17 Petty Criminals Associated Press, (August 17, 2006) https://www.justice.gov/pardon/gwbush-pardons
- Pardon More Than the Turkey San Francisco Chronicle, (November 23, 2006)
- President Bush Gives Out 16 Pardons, 1 Commutation WCBS Newsradio 880, (December 22, 2006)
