= John Forté =

American rapper (1975–2026)

John Edward Forté
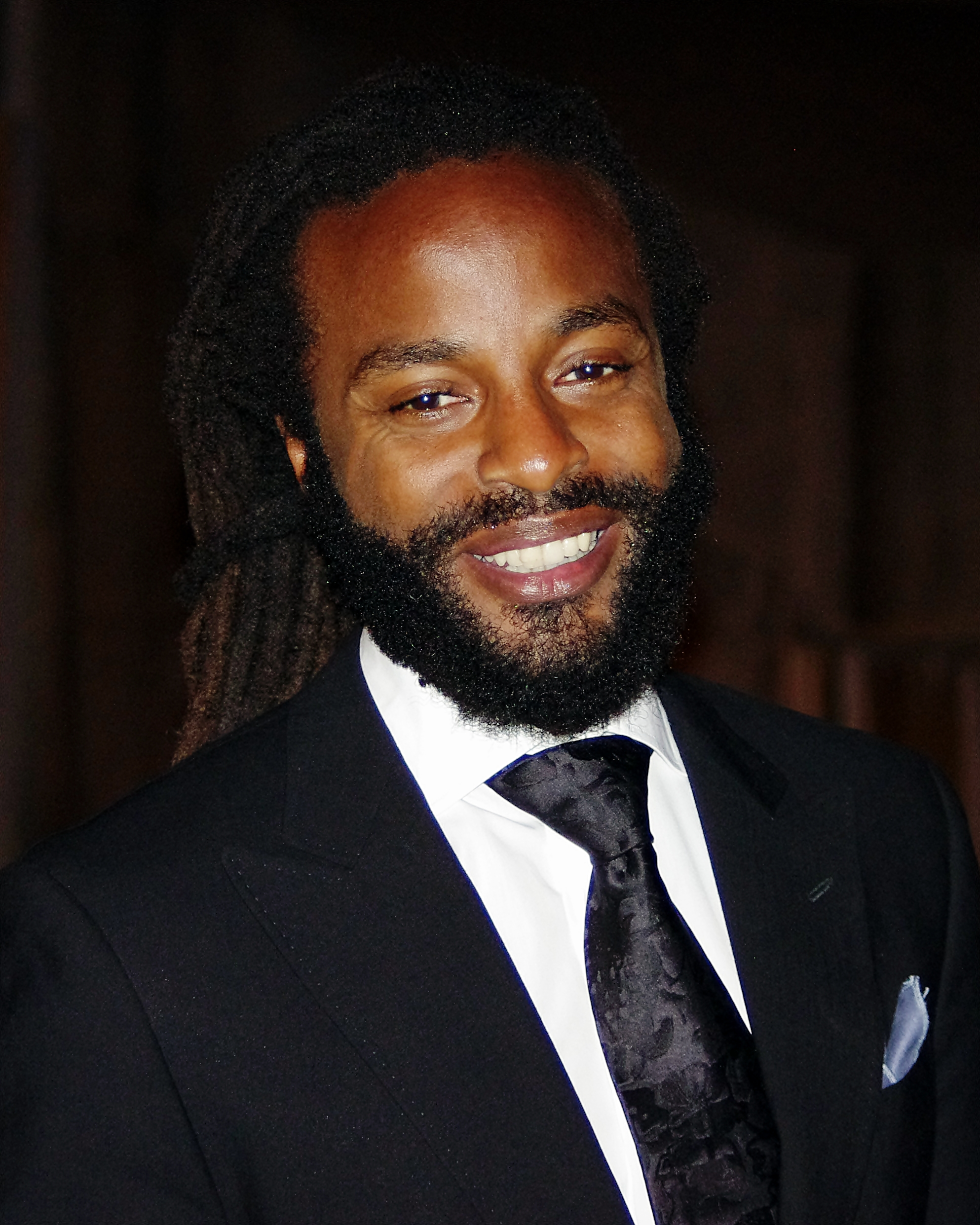
- Forté at the 2012 Tribeca Film Festival

Background information
- Born: January 30, 1975; New York City, U.S.
- Died: January 12, 2026 (aged 50) Chilmark, Massachusetts, U.S.
- Genres: Hip-hop
- Occupations: Rapper; record producer
- Years active: 1989–2001; 2008–2026
- Labels: EMI Records; Columbia Records
- Formerly of: Refugee Camp All-Stars
- Spouse: Lara Fuller (m. 2017)

John Edward Forté (January 30, 1975 – January 12, 2026) was an American rapper and record producer. He is best known for being a member of the musical collective Refugee Camp All-Stars. He also worked as a producer on The Score (1996), which received critical acclaim and earned Forté a Grammy Award nomination. His collaborations include "We Trying to Stay Alive" (with Wyclef Jean), "Rumble in the Jungle" (with the Fugees, A Tribe Called Quest and Busta Rhymes), and "2 Bad" (Refugee Camp Mix) (with Michael Jackson). In 1998, he released his debut studio album, Poly Sci.

In 2000, he was arrested and charged with possession with intent to distribute cocaine and conspiracy to distribute; he was convicted and sentenced to the mandatory minimum 14 years after being found guilty. Forté received support from several notable figures, including Carly Simon, who became a close ally and helped advocate on his behalf during his legal defense. Forté's prison sentence was later commuted by President George W. Bush in 2008.

== Early life and education ==
Forté was born in Brownsville, Brooklyn, New York City, on January 30, 1975. He studied classical violin and especially enjoyed the work of Vivaldi. He won a scholarship to study violin at the Phillips Exeter Academy in New Hampshire, where he graduated in 1993. However, Forté's musical journey began in his childhood prior to attending Phillips Exeter Academy. At the age of eight, while attending P.S. 327 in Brownsville, Brooklyn, he was faced with a choice during an instrument distribution day. Rather than wait in the long line for the more popular rock band instruments, he opted to enter the orchestra room, where he received a violin. He later described this moment as pivotal, noting that it profoundly influenced his path and gave him a sense of empowerment and belonging through music.

After high school, Forté returned to New York City, enrolling in NYU as a music business major, where he roomed with rapper Talib Kweli, before dropping out to work as an artist & repertoire executive at Rawkus Records.

== Career ==
=== Career beginnings and The Fugees ===
Forté began his professional music career when he was introduced to The Fugees by Lauryn Hill in the early 1990s. He co-wrote and produced several songs on their multi-platinum and Grammy-winning 1996 album, The Score. At 21 years of age, Forté was nominated for a Grammy for his work on the album. He went on to tour all over the world with The Fugees, and lent production and vocal performances to 1997's Wyclef Jean Presents The Carnival.

He partnered with former Fugee member Pras for the Top 40 hit single, "Avenues", from the Money Talks soundtrack.

Forté released his debut solo album, Poly Sci in 1998, which was produced by Wyclef Jean. The album featured performances by Fat Joe, DMX, 20 Grand Pikasoe and Jeni Fujita, and exhibited the same intriguing mix of street and mainstream culture that helped The Fugees break new ground. It was met with critical acclaim but commercial disappointment, selling just under 100,000 copies, blamed in part on the fact that "the record's project manager quit Sony Music a week before the album was released, and Columbia Records put little cash behind its promotional tour." Spin called it "a crush between academia and street life that's utterly absorbing."

=== 2000–2010 ===
In 2000, Forté was arrested at Newark International Airport after accepting a briefcase containing $1.5 million worth of liquid cocaine; he was charged with possession with intent to distribute cocaine and conspiracy to distribute. He was convicted and sentenced to the mandatory minimum 14 years after being found guilty, and incarcerated at FCI Loretto, a low-security federal prison in central Pennsylvania.

In 2001, Forté released the well-received I, John, which was recorded while awaiting trial for the drug offense. Unlike his debut, this album takes a more serious approach to music-making. The second album featured guest appearances by Herbie Hancock, Esthero and Tricky, and included a duet with Carly Simon.

Simon and her son Ben Taylor were advocates on Forté's behalf, believing he did not receive a fair trial; they fought for an appeal of the mandatory minimum drug laws that remove a judge's discretion in a case. They met Forté through Taylor's cousin, who was a classmate of Forté's at Phillips Exeter. "Carly is a mentor to me, a guide, absolutely my spiritual godmother," Forté said.

With the help of Senator Orrin Hatch, Forté's prison sentence was commuted by President George W. Bush on November 24, 2008. He was released from prison four weeks later, on December 22, 2008.

Since leaving the Federal Correctional Institution, Fort Dix on December 22, 2008, Forté recorded over 50 songs and played over 100 shows.

Soon after his release from prison, Forté recorded a cover of Kanye West's "Homecoming" with Talib Kweli. In the song, he discusses the issues surrounding his jail time. The music video was posted on Okayplayer on January 17, 2009. In 2009 he wrote various articles on The Daily Beast, and Okayplayer interviewed him as he began his teaching job at the City College of New York in late March 2009.

In July 2009, Forté released StyleFree, the EP, a body of work that provided social commentary combined with hope and inspiration. It allowed his audience to bear witness to the remaking of a man. The single off the EP, "Play my Cards For Me," an audible reflection of his hip-hop and R&B roots, was placed in the Queen Latifah/Common film Just Wright and the song "Nervous" was used in the film Stomp the Yard 2: Homecoming.

=== 2010s: Later career ===
In January 2010, Forté's work was featured throughout the Sundance Film Festival, where, in addition to performing at the ASCAP Music Café, he scored all of the opening festival trailers, had the end credit song in the film Night Catches Us, and participated in a unique audio and visual collaborative effort with Joe Gordon-Levitt at hitrecord.org. In the spring of 2010, Forté and his band participated in a successful 15-city tour with K'Naan, Wale and Tabi Bonney. Forté founded a production company called Le Castle in 2011 to manage the various projects that he undertook in music, film and other fields.

In February 2011, Le Castle produced a nine-week tour through Russia. Titled "From Brooklyn to Russia with Love!", the tour took Forté and his band – including bassist Brian Satz, percussionist Ryan Vaughn and keyboardist Patrick Firth – across Russia, from Moscow and St. Petersburg to Nizhny Novgorod, Kazan and Ekaterinburg, and other smaller locales along the Trans-Siberia Railway. Among the artists with whom Forté collaborated in Russia were Sunsay, Natasha Bedingfield, Evgeny Margulis, Alina Orlova, Billy's Band, Zero People, uma2rman, Emch Subatomic, Sergei Skrypka's State Symphony Cinema Orchestra, Romario, and more. All proceeds from the tour were donated to local orphanages and the international foundations Operation Smile and Petra Nemcova's Happy Hearts Fund. In September, Forté's begin releasing his first full-length album in 10 years, Water Light Sound. The album features collaborations with international stars John Legend, Natasha Bedingfield, Talib Kweli, HD Fre, AZ, Colin Munroe, and Valerie June. One of the tracks called "Your Side" (produced by Dallas Austin) was placed in EA FIFA World Cup 2010.

Water Light Sound will be launched in three vignettes. The first vignette "The Water Suite" will be made available to the public after an exclusive performance in Moscow on 27 September 2011, with Sunsay, an artist from Ukraine with whom Forté collaborated on the hit single "Windsong." From Moscow, Forté will continue his promotional tour to such cities as Stockholm, London, Paris, and Casablanca. The two remaining vignettes will be launched over the following months.

In 2012, Forté composed an anthem for the Brooklyn Nets, entitled "Brooklyn: Something to Lean On".

Forté also appeared on an episode of NY Ink January 2012.

He composed the theme song for the CBS News television documentary series Brooklyn DA.

He released Riddem Drive in 2020. His final album, Vessels, Angels & Ancestors, was released in October 2021.

== Personal life and death ==
Forté married Lara Fuller, a photographer, in 2017. They had two children.

Forté was found dead at his home in Chilmark, Massachusetts, on January 12, 2026. He was 50. The cause of death was complications from the flu.

== Discography ==
=== Albums ===
- Poly Sci (1998)
- I, John (2002)
- Stylefree the EP (2009)
- Water Light Sound (2011)
- Riddem Drive (2020)
- Vessels, Angels & Ancestors (2021)
