= I, John =

Studio album by John Forté
- Released: April 23, 2002
- Genre: Hip-hop
- Length: 60:51
- Label: Transparent
- Producer: JK; John Forté

John Forté chronology
Poly Sci (1998)	I, John (2002)

Professional ratings
Review scores
Source	Rating
AllMusic	3/5 stars
HipHopDX	3.5/5
The Village Voice	A−

I, John is the second album by rapper John Forté. It was released in 2002 on the indie label Transparent. Recorded while he was awaiting sentencing for drug distribution charges, Forte's album was arguably the most introspective, reflective, and experimental of his short career. "Harmonize" rides a classic break beat and shows the styling that he employed so successfully with the Fugees. However, "Been There, Done That" might as well be an alternative rock song, and "Reunion" closes the album in acoustic fashion. "Will you hold a place for me?" John vulnerably sings.

== Track listing ==
1. "What A Difference"
  - Featuring Dinah Washington
2. "Harmonize"
  - Featuring Robyn Springer
3. "What You're Used To"
4. "Trouble Again"
  - Featuring Tricky
5. "All the Pretty People"
6. "Take Time, Slow Down"
7. "Beware"
8. "Been There, Done That"
  - Featuring Carly Simon
9. "How Could I?"
  - Featuring Esthero
10. "Out of Bed"
11. "Hungry"
12. "Dearest Father"
13. "Lady"
14. "Reunion"
