= Howard Mechanic =

Howard Lawrence Mechanic was an undergraduate student at Washington University in St. Louis who went into hiding for 28 years after being accused of throwing a cherry bomb at the university's ROTC building during a Vietnam War protest in May 1970.

Mechanic denied throwing the firecracker. No one was injured, but Mechanic was charged under the Civil Obedience Act of 1968 and sentenced to five years in prison. During his appeals, he fled and subsequently lived under the assumed name of "Gary Robert Tredway" in Scottsdale, Arizona.

His identity as Howard Mechanic became known when he decided to run for office on the Scottsdale City Council in 2000. He was discovered following an interview with reporter Penny Overton of the Scottsdale Tribune, who became suspicious after running a background check. Mechanic tried to dissuade Overton from publishing the story by falsely claiming that he had leukemia, but the newspaper published the story anyway. Mechanic turned himself in on February 10, 2000, and was immediately sent to prison to serve out his term. New charges were also filed against him of faking his identity and using a false name to acquire public documents including a driver's license and a passport.

Mechanic received a pardon from President Bill Clinton in January 2001.
