= Robert Freeland Jr. =

Indiana politician

Robert Linward Freeland Jr. (May 5, 1939 - June 24, 2022) was a businessman, public official, and state legislator in Indiana. A Democrat, he was elected to represent Lake County, Indiana, in 1973. He lived in Gary, Indiana his entire life and served in the public sector for 60 years including as a city councilman and recorder as well as in the state house. The Indiana State Library has a photograph of him.

He was the son of Robert Linward Freeland Sr. and Mamie Mack. He owned a lounge, liquor store, furniture store and Italian restaurant. He was a member of the NAACP, Urban League, Gary Police Commission, Northwest Indiana Planning Commission, and Gary Frontiers International Civic Club. One of his early campaign flyers stated "My roots run deep in Gary and so does my concerns and commitment to Black People in this City." He had two brother and a sister and had children.

He was pardoned by U.S. President Bill Clinton in 1994 after a 1983 conviction for "forcible rescue of seized property."
