= List of people pardoned by George H. W. Bush =

The following is a list of the 75 pardons and 3 commutations by President George H. W. Bush. The list is organized by the date on which President George H. W. Bush granted the pardon or commutation.

This list is a subset of the list of people pardoned by a United States president.

== Definitions ==
A pardon means an executive order vacating a conviction.

A commutation means a mitigation of the sentence of someone currently serving a sentence for a crime pursuant to a conviction, without vacating the conviction itself.

== August 14, 1989 ==
=== Pardoned ===
- Joe llen Deckert (1979 Misprision of felony (relating to illegal firearms sales))
- Donald Alvin Dibble III (1978 Illegal possession of firearm with obliterated serial number)
- Leo Friedman (1969 Mail embezzlement)
- Armand Hammer (1976 Making campaign contribution in name of another (misdemeanor))
- Charles Arnold Jacobs (1979 Submission of false income tax return)
- Mary Lou Peet (1978 Fraudulent transfer of property in contemplation of bankruptcy)
- Robert Gary Rice (1973 Submitting false statements to Federal Housing Administration)
- Billy Wayne Rodgers (1973 Transporting firearm in foreign commerce, Insubordination in violation of Article 91, Uniform Code of Military Justice)
- Raymond Joseph Shovelski (1974 Conspiracy to accept kickbacks on Government contracts)

=== Commutation ===
- Douglas Bruce Fenimore (1981 Receiving and concealing stolen property, interstate transportation of stolen property, and bank robbery)

== March 5, 1991 ==
=== Pardoned ===
- Dorothy Christina Damush (1982 Conspiracy to transport stolen goods in interstate commerce)
- David Feld (1980 Interference with agent of National Labor Relations Board (misdemeanor))
- Mark Christopher Felling (1980 Theft of mail by postal employee)
- Howard William Fitzsimmons (1974 Embezzlement of Government property)
- Garth Stuart Hancock (1959 Conspiracy to violate Commodity Credit Regulations)
- Charles Walker Harrison (1966 Unlawful possession of narcotics without having paid transfer tax)
- Geary Travis Holstead (1978 Theft of mail by postal employee)
- Michael Dennis Larsen (1977 Bank embezzlement)
- Mark Allen Nelson (1975 Involuntary manslaughter in violation of Article 119, UCMJ)
- Robert Anthony Pagnanelli (1980 Conspiracy to defraud United States and mail fraud)
- William George Spurlock (1953 Interstate transportation of stolen motor vehicle)
- Harold Bennett Stewart (1963 Theft of Government property)
- Bernice Lena Telgemeier (1980 Attempted income tax evasion)
- Julius Henry Telgemeier (1980 Attempted income tax evasion)
- William Newton Tunnell, Jr. (1977 Bank embezzlement)
- Robert Lee Warner (1979 Obstruction of mail)
- James Alexander Womack (1978 Possession of stolen mail)

== July 5, 1991 ==
=== Pardoned ===
- Joseph Berger (1959 Transporting gambling devices within a special maritime and territorial jurisdiction of the United States)
- Miles Oakley Bidwell (1962 Filing false statement)
- Edward Meredith Dawsey (1981 Making false statements to the Office of Workmen's Compensation Programs)
- Leonard Gilmor (1975 Mail fraud and aiding and abetting)
- Lewis Isador Goltz (1976 Sale of firearms to out-of-state resident, failure to register firearms, failure to make appropriate entry in firearm acquisition disposition records)
- Wayne Stanley LaTour (1980 Dealing in firearms without a license)
- Thomas Leoutsakos (1968 Sale of methamphetamine (misdemeanor))
- Mary Mahoney Longwell (1976 Embezzlement of bank funds)
- Barbara Cecil Livenia Chapman Portwood (1962 Forgery)
- Laurie Virginia Rossetti (1976 Engaging in the conduct of an illegal gambling business)
- Myra Soble (1957 Conspiracy to receive and obtain national defense information and transmit same to foreign government)
- Rudolph Hartsel Young (1960 Embezzlement of postal funds and falsification of postal records)

== December 24, 1992 ==
=== Pardoned ===
- Caspar W. Weinberger (1988 Several counts of perjury, See Iran-Contra Affair)
- Elliott Abrams (1988 Two counts of unlawfully withholding information. See Iran-Contra Affair)
- Duane R. Clarridge (1991 Seven counts of perjury and false statements, See Iran-Contra Affair)
- Alan D. Fiers (1991 Two misdemeanor counts of withholding information from the Congress, See Iran-Contra Affair)
- Clair George
  1. (1991 Ten counts of perjury, false statements and obstruction)
  2. (1992 two felony charges of false statements and perjury before Congress — see Iran-Contra Affair)
- Robert C. McFarlane (1988 See Iran-Contra Affair)
- Joseph Bear, Jr. (1964 Burglary on Indian Reservation)
- Thomas Burley Berry (1980 Detaining and destroying mail)
- Robert William Dailey, Sr. (1943 Failure to report for induction into the military in violation of the Selective Training and Service Act of 1940)
- Paul Karsten Fauteck
  1. (1950 Interstate transportation of stolen motor vehicle)
  2. (1955 Conspiracy to smuggle alien into United States and attempting to conceal alien)
  3. (1955 Transporting false securities in interstate commerce)
  4. (1954 Absent without leave from Army and wrongful disposition of government property)
  5. (1955 Absent without leave)
- Dale Leonard Fix (1944 Failure to report for military duty in violation of Selective Service Act of 1940)
- Francene Geiger (1980 Bank embezzlement)
- Ivan Leon Gentry (1946 Transporting stolen motor vehicle in interstate commerce)
- Joseph Gordon Haynie, Jr. (1973 Misapplication of bank funds)
- Thom Davies (1989 Illegal substance and prostitution offences)
- Henry Levin (1973 Violation of Customs regulations)
- Guillermo Medrano Moreno
  1. (1961 Failure to register as narcotics user)
  2. (1967 Illegal importation and sale of heroin)
- Frank T. Passini, III (1978 Possession and sale of 5,000 grams of marijuana and wrongful possession of 50 grams of marijuana in violation of Article 134, Uniform Code of Military Justice)
- Donald Rightmire (1984 Misprision of a felony)
- Edwin Roberts (1947 Carrying on the business of a distiller, possessing an unregistered whiskey still, and making and fermenting mash fit for distillation)
- Patrick James Sheehan (1981 Misapplication of bank funds)
- Hildred Earl Spates (1971 Theft of government property)
- Alfredo Encinas Villarreal (1971 Theft of mail by postal employee)
- Jack Alvin Walker (1956 Failure to report for military duty in violation of Selective Service Act of 1950)
- Carl Frank Westminster, Jr. (1977 Possession (one ounce of marijuana) controlled substance in violation of Article 92, Uniform Code of Military Justice)

== January 15, 1993 ==
=== Commutation ===
- Joseph Occhipinti (1991 Federal drug agent convicted of conspiracy to violate civil rights, deprivation of rights under color of law (misdemeanor), and making false statement)

== January 18, 1993 ==
=== Pardoned ===
- Robert Edward Leigh Barnhill (1980 Bid rigging in violation of Sherman Antitrust Act)
- George Edward Clements, III (1987 Knowingly making false declarations before grand jury)
- Edwin L. Cox, Jr. (1988 Bank fraud)
- Lloyd Earl Davis (1981 Making false entries in bank records)
- James Lewis Donawho (1979 Making false statement to government agency)
- John Stinson Howell, III (1979 Income tax evasion)
- Charles Elvin Huffman (1955 Larceny on a government reservation)
- Thomas Arthur Kardashian (1974 Offering gratuities to public officials)
- Frederick Irwin Lorber (1962 Obtaining marijuana without paying transfer tax)
- Richard Norris Ware (1973 Aiding and abetting bank embezzlement (misdemeanor))
- Albert Teyechea Williams (1980 Conspiracy to misapply bank funds)
- Clyde Henry Umphenour, Jr. (1956 & 1961 Two counts Interstate transportation of forged securities)

=== Commutation ===
- Aslam P. Adam (1985 Conspiracy to possess with intent to distribute heroin, importation of heroin, and use of mail in committing felony)

== See also ==
- List of people pardoned by a United States president
- Orlando Bosch — released but not pardoned by Bush

== Sources ==
General references:

- George H. W. Bush's pardons from the U.S. Department of Justice website
- Presidential pardons from a University of Pittsburgh School of Law website
