= Gurfein =

Gurfein is a surname. Notable people with the surname include:

- David Gurfein, American U.S. Marine Corps lieutenant colonel, and CEO of nonprofit organization United American Patriots
- Jim Gurfein (born 1961), American tennis player
- Murray Gurfein (1907–1979), American judge
- Ty Gurfein (born 1989), American dancer
