= Duncan Hunter =

Duncan Hunter may refer to:

- Duncan D. Hunter (born 1976), member of the U.S. House of Representatives from California (2009–2020)
- Duncan L. Hunter (born 1948), member of the U.S. House of Representatives from California (1981–2009)
- Duncan Hunter (cyclist), Australian road cyclist, winner of the 1948 Australian National Road Race Championships Men's Elite division
