= WMBR =

Radio station at the Massachusetts Institute of Technology

- Cambridge, Massachusetts; United States
- Broadcast area: Greater Boston
- Frequency: 88.1 MHz

Programming
- Format: Freeform

Ownership
- Owner: Technology Broadcasting Corporation

History
- First air date: April 10, 1961
- Former call signs: WTBS (1961–1979)
- Call sign meaning: "Walker Memorial Basement Radio"

Technical information
- Licensing authority: FCC
- Facility ID: 64683
- Class: A
- ERP: 640 watts
- HAAT: 92 meters (302 ft)
- Transmitter coordinates: 42°21′42.1″N 71°5′7.9″W

Links
- Public license information: Public file; LMS
- Webcast: Listen live
- Website: www.wmbr.org

WMBR is the Massachusetts Institute of Technology's student-run college radio station, licensed to Cambridge, Massachusetts, and broadcasting on 88.1 FM. It is all-volunteer and funded by listener donations and MIT funds. Both students and community members can apply for positions, and like many college radio stations, WMBR offers diverse programming that includes a broad range of musical genres as well as talk shows.

As of 2026, the general manager is Brandon Gillen and the program director is Serena Zhu.

The station's board of trustees is the Technology Broadcasting Corporation, whose members are appointed by the President of MIT. Members include Marianna Parker (President), Joseph Paradiso (Vice President), Todd Glickman (Clerk), and Shawn Mamros (Treasurer).

== History ==
Student-run radio broadcasting began at the university on November 25, 1946. This initially was an AM band "carrier current" station, which was a self-supporting commercial operation, that originated from a transmitter located in the Ware entryway of Senior House dormitory. The station's signal was fed over power lines, initially at 800 kHz, and later 640 kHz, and was receivable only within a few hundred feet of the dorms. The programming was simultaneously carried over "dorm line" wires, that ran past the exterior windows of the MIT dormitories, for residents to connect to their hi-fi gear. Under Federal Communications Commission (FCC) Part 15 regulations, carrier current stations do not require a license or receive official call letters, and it adopted the self-assigned identifier of "WMIT". An early experiment in stereo broadcasting, in 1960, put one stereo channel on the AM signal and the other on the dorm lines.

The broadcasting was eventually supplemented by a low power "Class D" non-commercial FM station, when the university received a construction permit to establish a station on 88.1 mHz. Because the call letters WMIT had been assigned to a North Carolina station, this new station was assigned the call sign WTBS, for "Technology Broadcasting System". New facilities were constructed in the basement of Walker Memorial, including a switching and mixing console designed by A. R. Kent and Barry Blesser, believed to be one of the first all-transistorized consoles. On April 10, 1961, WTBS signed on from a small antenna atop the Walker Memorial Building, which houses its studios, with an effective radiated power (ERP) of 14 watts, at 88.1 megahertz. (This frequency corresponds to a wavelength of 3.40 meters, or, using a local humorous measurement, approximately 2 smoots.) In the early 1970s, the antenna was moved to the much higher Eastgate Apartment Building, dramatically improving the signal's range.

WTBS continued to operate the carrier-current system to the dormitories on 640 kHz, with an identical program, except for commercial breaks on the AM side, during which the noncommercial FM station ran public-service announcements, and, later, parody "advertisements" for fictitious products such as "Apple Gunkies" and firms such as "Nocturnal Aviation". The carrier current transmissions were discontinued in the early 1970s.

The all-request "Nite Owl" was a popular weekend feature, and a "Waveform of the Week" was broadcast for the enjoyment of MIT students watching the program on oscilloscopes. Since the station allowed a certain amount of non-students to conduct shows, WTBS was able to tap into the active music and arts community in the Cambridge-Boston area and was acknowledged as the metropolitan area's most eclectic station of the era, featuring jazz, folk music, rhythm and blues, classical music and among the first programs featuring the emerging "underground rock" music in the 1960s and the "new wave" music in the 1970s.

In 1978, Ted Turner, then operator of Atlanta, Georgia television station WTCG, wanted to use the call letters "WTBS", for Turner Broadcasting System. Although call letters technically are not for sale, Turner and WTBS worked out a stratagem whereby Turner gave a $25,000 donation to WTBS, with an agreement that WTBS would apply for new call letters, with a second donation of $25,000 promised if the FCC were to grant the letters "WTBS" to Turner. WTBS used the donation for new transmitter equipment, and on November 10, 1979, the station's call letters became WMBR, for "Walker Memorial Basement Radio", with 200 watts of power, later increased to 720 watts.

== See also ==
- Campus radio
- List of college radio stations in the United States
