= Eddie Gallagher (Navy SEAL) =

Former United States Navy SEAL (born 1979)

- Born: May 29, 1979 (age 47); Fort Wayne, Indiana, U.S.
- Military career
- Allegiance: United States
- Branch: United States Navy
- Service years: 1999–2019
- Rank: Chief Petty Officer
- Units: Naval Special Warfare Group 1 • SEAL Team 7
- Conflicts: War in Afghanistan; Iraq War; Operation Inherent Resolve
- Awards: SEAL Trident; Bronze Star with valor (2); Joint Service Commendation Medal; Navy and Marine Corps Commendation Medal
- Website: https://theeddiegallagher.com/

Edward R. Gallagher is a retired United States Navy SEAL. He came to national attention in the United States after he was charged in September 2018 with ten offenses under the Uniform Code of Military Justice. In the most prominently reported offense, he was accused of fatally stabbing an injured 17-year-old ISIS prisoner, photographing himself with the corpse, and sending the photo to friends.

On July 2, 2019, Gallagher was convicted of posing for a photograph with the corpse, but was acquitted of murder charges after Special Operator Corey Scott, a member of Gallagher's team granted immunity as a witness against him, testified that he, not Gallagher, killed the prisoner.

== Career ==
Born in Fort Wayne, Indiana, on May 29, 1979, Gallagher graduated from Bishop Dwenger High School. He enlisted in the United States Navy in 1999. Gallagher had eight overseas deployments, including service in both the Iraq War and the war in Afghanistan. He was trained as a medic, a sniper, and an explosives expert. He graduated from the United States Marine Corps Scout Sniper school. He was attached to a U.S. Marine Corps unit until he enrolled in Basic Underwater Demolition/ SEAL (BUD/S) class 252 to become a Navy SEAL in 2005. Following SEAL Qualification Training (SQT), he received the NEC 5326 as a Combatant Swimmer (SEAL), entitled to wear the Special Warfare Insignia.

During his service, he was decorated for valor several times, including two Bronze Stars. He received positive evaluations from his superiors within the SEALs, and served as an instructor in the SEALs BUD/S program for recruits. Gallagher was involved in controversies and investigations, but received few formal reprimands. He was the subject of an investigation into the shooting of a young girl in Afghanistan in 2010, but was cleared of wrongdoing after being investigated by close comrades who had deployed with him. He allegedly tried to run over a Navy police officer with his car in 2014, after being detained at a traffic stop. By 2015, Gallagher had acquired a reputation as someone who was more interested in "fighting terrorists", but less interested in complying with rules.

During his eighth deployment in 2017, Gallagher's aggressiveness seemed to be amplified during the Battle for Mosul. Here, his mission was to serve in an advisory role, versus taking part in direct action. Gallagher was the subject of a number of reports from fellow SEAL team members, stating that his actions were not in keeping with the rules of war, but these reports were dismissed by the SEAL command structure. Only after the reports gained visibility outside the SEAL community, were they acted upon and referred to the Naval Criminal Investigative Service (NCIS).

On September 11, 2018, Gallagher was arrested at Camp Pendleton and charged with premeditated murder, attempted murder, obstruction of justice, and other offenses. On October 18, Lieutenant Jacob Portier of Gallagher's platoon was also charged with failing to properly notify his superiors within the chain of command and destruction of evidence. Gallagher pleaded not guilty to all the charges against him.

== Criminal accusation ==
Gallagher was accused of multiple offenses during his final deployment to Iraq and during the Battle for Mosul. The most prominent accusation and the best-attested to was the murder of a prisoner of war, a war crime. Khaled Jamal Abdullah, a captured 17-year-old fighter of the Islamic State, was being treated by a medic. According to two SEAL witnesses, Gallagher said "he's mine" over the radio, then walked up to Abdullah and allegedly proceeded to stab him with his hunting knife without explanation. Gallagher and his commanding officer, Lieutenant Jake Portier, then posed for photographs of them standing over the body with some other nearby SEALs. Gallagher then text messaged a friend in California a picture of himself holding the dead captive's head by the hair with the explanation "Good story behind this, got him with my hunting knife.”

Prosecutors alleged that Gallagher's sniper work during his 2017 deployment became "reckless" and "bloodthirsty". He allegedly fired his rifle far more frequently than other snipers; according to testimony, the other snipers in the platoon did not consider him a good sniper, and he took "random shots" into buildings. Other snipers said they witnessed Gallagher taking at least two militarily pointless shots, shooting and killing an unarmed elderly man in a white robe as well as a young girl walking with other girls. Gallagher allegedly boasted about the large number of people he had killed, claiming he averaged three kills a day over 80 days, including four women. Gallagher also was reportedly known for indiscriminately spraying neighborhoods with rockets and machine gun fire with no known enemy force in the region.

A charge of obstruction of justice was brought against Gallagher for alleged witness intimidation. According to the claim, Gallagher threatened to kill fellow SEALs if they reported his actions. The Navy cited his text messages as attempting to undermine the investigation, with messages sent to "pass the word on those traitors", meaning cooperating witnesses, and to get them blacklisted within the special warfare community. This resulted in him being confined in the brig for a time with heavy restrictions on his ability to communicate, although this confinement was later lessened.

Gallagher was also charged with nearly a dozen lesser offenses. Some of these charges, such as flying a drone over a corpse, were dismissed during preliminary hearings.

According to the original Navy prosecutor Chris Czaplak, "Chief Gallagher decided to act like the monster the terrorists accuse us of being. He handed ISIS propaganda manna from heaven. His actions are everything ISIS says we are." Gallagher's lawyer, Phillip Stackhouse, alleged the accusations were without foundation and came from a small number of disgruntled SEALs who could not meet Gallagher's leadership demands.

== Court martial controversies ==
The case was considered to be "difficult" because the Navy did not begin a formal investigation for nearly a year after the reports were made and by then much of the physical evidence, such as the bodies of those alleged to be killed by Gallagher, were not recoverable. The family of Abdullah, the ISIS fighter Gallagher allegedly stabbed to death, was contacted by media several years after the event and claimed that they were unaware of the circumstances surrounding their son's death and that they had not been contacted by prosecutors.

The prosecution's case relied largely on eyewitness testimony, which the defense sought to discredit as merely that of spiteful malcontents who disliked Gallagher's gruff leadership style. The defense also called eyewitnesses, with Marine Staff Sgt. Giorgio Kirylo testifying that he saw Gallagher try to save the prisoner, and observed no stab wounds on the dead man. The defense argued that Gallagher's text messages merely reflected dark comedy in a stressful situation, and that his more outrageous boasts, such as killing twenty people a day, were clearly impossible. Some potential witnesses were non-cooperative, citing the Fifth Amendment's protection against self-incrimination when refusing to testify.

The defense also claimed that the lead NCIS agent slanted witness statements and interviews to be more hostile to Gallagher than warranted in his notes. For the most serious charge of murder of a prisoner, according to the defense, Gallagher stabbed a corpse and embellished a story out of misplaced bravado; the prisoner had already died of his wounds. The defense cited two high-ranking Iraqi Army members that the detainee was "barely alive" when he arrived; according to prosecution witnesses, the prisoner's leg injury did not appear serious to the initial medic who treated the prisoner, and that the medic was surprised the detainee was dead when he returned.

In March 2019, former Navy SEAL and U.S. representative Dan Crenshaw of Texas and seventeen other Republican members of the U.S. House of Representatives wrote a letter to then-secretary of the Navy Richard V. Spencer asking for Gallagher's pre-trial confinement to be reviewed. On March 30, President Donald J. Trump intervened and ordered Gallagher transferred to "less restrictive confinement" after complaints from his supporters, particularly commentators on Fox and Friends, about his detainment.

In May 2019, defense lawyers accused the prosecution of sending both them and Navy Times reporter Carl Prine an email that included a web beacon. People who viewed the original email or a forward of this email would likely load the image through their mail-reading program (electronic mail, or e-mail client), which would record where it came from; this allows for imperfect monitoring of who has seen an email, without installing any software. It has been speculated that this image was intended to find leakers violating the judge's gag order, as reporters (including Prine) have repeatedly reported contents of private documents related to the case. As a result of the spying controversy, the judge ordered Gallagher freed from prison while awaiting trial as a remedy to interference from the prosecution. The judge later ordered that the chief prosecutor, Commander Christopher Czaplak, be dismissed from the case and replaced as a result of the incident.

On May 8, 2019, then Republican congressman Duncan D. Hunter showed combat video footage from a helmet camera to a group of legislators that he said exonerated Gallagher of one of the charges against him. Hunter told reporters that he intended to ask for a presidential pardon if Gallagher was convicted. According to anonymous administration sources, the Justice Department was reviewing Gallagher's case in preparation for a possible pardon from President Trump. This potential pardon was hotly criticized in the Washington Post's opinion pages. The Daily Beast and CNN later reported that Fox & Friends co-host Pete Hegseth had sought to convince Trump to support and pardon Gallagher for months. At the same time, Hegseth was discussing these cases on Fox News without disclosing that he had advised Trump to pardon them. During a podcast interview on May 28, 2019, Hunter said that he himself had posed for pictures with a dead enemy combatant and that American artillery fire had killed "hundreds" of Iraqi civilians in and around Fallujah.

On June 20, 2019, during Gallagher's trial, one of the platoon medics from Gallagher's team testifying as a prosecution witness said that although Gallagher did stab the ISIS fighter, he did not actually kill him. The medic, Special Operator First Class Corey Scott who testified under an immunity agreement, testified that he himself had killed the wounded prisoner by covering his breathing tube and asphyxiating him. Scott called it a "mercy killing" and argued that the victim would have been tortured by Iraqi personnel because of his connection to the Islamic State. Following Scott's confession, prosecutors canceled other witnesses they had planned to call, fearing their testimony would further undermine their case.

Prosecutors were taken by surprise by Scott's testimony, since the medic had never given this version of events to them or Navy investigators. This account was also contrary to the statements of at least seven other SEALs as well as Scott's previous statements. Because of the immunity agreement Scott could not be prosecuted for testifying that he killed the prisoner. And while press reports suggested Scott could conceivably be charged with perjury, the Navy dropped its investigation into his statements shortly after Gallagher's acquittal.

== Court martial result ==
=== Conviction and demotion ===
The jury for Gallagher's court-martial was composed of five enlisted men, including a Navy SEAL and four Marines, plus a Navy commander and a Marine chief warrant officer, after the defense had rejected several other candidates. On July 2, 2019, they acquitted him on six of the seven original charges but found him guilty of the seventh charge of "wrongfully posing for an unofficial picture with a human casualty". That charge carried a maximum prison sentence of four months. Since Gallagher had already served more time during his pre-trial confinement, he was released.

After the trial, it was considered possible that Special Warfare Operator 1st Class Corey Scott, the SEAL Medic whose surprise testimony dismantled the prosecution's case, would be prosecuted for perjury; however, Chief of Naval Operations John M. Richardson stripped Navy prosecutors of their authority to charge Scott with perjury. The same jury that tried Gallagher sentenced him on July 3, 2019, for posing with the corpse. The jury gave Gallagher, who had already served the maximum prison time for this charge, a demotion from Chief Petty Officer (E-7) to Petty Officer First Class (E-6); this was lighter than other potential punishments, such as an Other Than Honorable (OTH) discharge, which were not handed down. President Trump congratulated Gallagher on his acquittal over Twitter. Four weeks later, President Trump announced over Twitter he had directed the Secretary of the Navy to revoke Navy Achievement Medals given to members of the prosecution team that oversaw Gallagher's case.

After the closure of the case, Gallagher and his initial lawyer entered a dispute in August 2019. According to his first lawyer, Colby Vokey, Gallagher did not pay Vokey's specified rate, and he filed an arbitration claim against Gallagher. According to Gallagher, Vokey performed no useful services and was bilking him. Gallagher cut ties with Vokey and the United American Patriots in March 2019 and directed supporters to use a different non-profit to raise funds for his defense, the Navy SEALs Fund.

=== Request for clemency ===
Gallagher and his lawyers made an appeal for clemency at the conclusion of the court martial; such requests are frequently made, although rarely successful. Because of the charged nature of the case, this request went high up the chain of command. The request was initially rejected by Rear Admiral Bette Bolivar. After President Trump brought the issue up at a meeting with Chief of Naval Operations John M. Richardson, Admiral Richardson took up the request personally. After Richardson's retirement in August 2019, his replacement Admiral Michael M. Gilday took ownership of the request. Gilday eventually partially granted the request in October 2019: he reduced the punishment from a full demotion to a one-rank demotion to special operator first class, as the jury had recommended, rather than the default demotion to Seaman Recruit (E-1). This would result in an improvement to Gallagher's pension and retirement benefits. According to a former Navy prosecutor, the top admiral in the Navy directly handling such a matter is extremely rare, but not unmerited because of the high profile of the case.

=== Presidential intervention ===
The clemency decision ended up moot: in November 2019, President Trump announced that Gallagher's demotion would be reversed. A week earlier, Navy secretary Richard V. Spencer had sent Trump a note asking him not to intervene again. The president's move also favored several other military members accused of misconduct: in addition to Gallagher, Lieutenant Clint Lorance was ordered freed; and the prosecution of Matthew Golsteyn was ended.

Following his acquittal, Gallagher spoke publicly about the case, appearing on Fox News without authorization, and using social media to describe his superiors, including Rear Admiral Collin P. Green, the newly installed commander of the SEALs, as "a bunch of morons". Green ordered Gallagher's case to be investigated by the Trident Review Board to determine whether Gallagher should be stripped of his SEAL Trident insignia, the official certification symbol of the Naval Special Warfare SEAL community. Green noted that SEALs with criminal convictions almost always lose their Trident Pin.

On November 21, President Trump tweeted, "The Navy will NOT be taking away Warfighter and Navy Seal Eddie Gallagher's Trident Pin. This case was handled very badly from the beginning. Get back to business!" Spencer responded that terminating this probe could be done only via an official written order from the White House. Associates said Spencer would resign if such an order is issued, believing it undercuts his authority and that of Rear Adm. Collin Green, commander of the SEALs.

On November 24, 2019, Defense Secretary Mark Esper said he had learned that Spencer made a private offer to the White House that if the White House did not interfere, he would guarantee that Gallagher would keep his Trident pin. This offer contradicted Spencer's public position and was kept secret from Esper. Esper immediately fired Spencer for going outside the chain of command. The next day (Nov. 25) Esper said that Trump had ordered him to allow Gallagher to keep his Trident Pin, so that Gallagher remained a SEAL until his retirement at the end of November 2019. Also on November 25, Trump told reporters that Gallagher "was one of the ultimate fighters". Gallagher's case was scheduled for a hearing by the Navy SEAL review board on December 2, 2019.

Gallagher was one of three military personnel accused or convicted of war crimes on whose behalf Trump had intervened to pardon or promote, although Gallagher was neither pardoned nor promoted. Trump told a rally audience days after his intervention, "I stuck up for three great warriors against the deep state."

After the not guilty verdict, the New York Times revisited the case and accessed, using the Freedom of Information Act (FOIA), investigative reports and also videos of interviews in which six SEALs under the command of Gallagher had separately extensively detailed his ongoing prohibited combat zone behavior, sometimes crying as they recounted his alleged actions. "The guy is freaking evil," Special Operator First (SO1) Class Craig Miller said. "The guy was toxic," said SO1 Joshua Vriens. Special Operator First Class Corey Scott, a platoon medic, had informed investigators, "You could tell he was perfectly O.K. with killing anybody that was moving," but recanting his testimony during the Gallagher trial, for which he was given immunity, saying he had committed the murder himself, presumably powerfully influencing the not guilty verdict.

== Awards and decorations ==
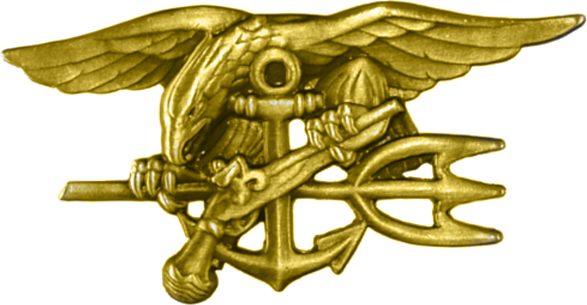

Special Warfare insignia
Bronze Star with "V" device and one 5/16 inch gold star		Joint Service Commendation Medal
Navy and Marine Corps Commendation Medal with 1 5/16 inch gold star	Navy and Marine Corps Achievement Medal with "V" device and 2 5/16 gold inch stars	Combat Action Ribbon with 2 5/16 gold inch stars
Navy Presidential Unit Citation	Navy Meritorious Unit Commendation	Army Meritorious Unit Commendation
Navy Good Conduct Medal with 1 silver 3/16 inch star	National Defense Service Medal	Afghanistan Campaign Medal with 2 bronze 3/16 inch stars
Iraq Campaign Medal with 1 bronze 3/16 inch star	Inherent Resolve Campaign Medal with 1 bronze 3/16 inch star	Global War on Terrorism Expeditionary Medal
Global War on Terrorism Service Medal	Navy and Marine Corps Sea Service Deployment Ribbon with 1 silver and 2 bronze 3/16 inch stars	Overseas Service Ribbon
NATO Medal for Afghanistan	Rifle Marksmanship Medal with Expert Device	Pistol Marksmanship Medal with Expert Device
Navy and Marine Corps Parachutist Badge

== Retirement from the U.S. Navy ==
At the end of November 2019, Gallagher retired from the Navy with full honors, pension, and medical benefits. Following his Navy career, Gallagher began commercial ventures including an action figure, clothing line and nutritional supplement endorsements.

== Publicity ==
=== 60 Minutes ===
In March 2020, David Martin of CBS News interviewed Gallagher, his wife, and his attorney on the CBS program 60 Minutes.

=== YouTube ===
He was interviewed in 2020 by former Navy SEAL and current K9 trainer Mike Ritland on YouTube. Gallagher openly discussed topics including his career, the raid upon his home, pre-trial confinement, legal proceedings, acquittal, retirement, and his life and family.

He was also interviewed in 2020 by former Navy SEAL and former CIA Contractor Shawn Ryan on YouTube. In that episode, (Shawn Ryan Show #008) Chief Gallagher explained in depth how teammates under his command at SEAL Team 7 not only accused him of being a war criminal, but relentlessly tried to send him away to life in prison for the alleged stabbing of an Islamic State fighter in Mosul, Iraq.

=== Book ===
Gallagher and his wife are authors of the book, The Man in the Arena: From Fighting Isis to Fighting for My Freedom published by Ballast Books (2021) ISBN 9781733428002.

=== Television ===
A limited television series adaptation based on the life of Gallagher is in development by Working Title Television and The New York Times with Will Staples to write.

=== The Line podcast ===
In 2021 Gallagher said on the podcast The Line that although he did not stab the ISIS fighter "[the ISIS fighter] was killed by us and that nobody at that time had a problem with it", and that the group performed medical procedures on the prisoner which killed him (including inserting an emergency airway into the ISIS fighter's throat, "just for practice"). Gallagher's attorney during the court-martial, Tim Parlatore, said this was not new information as the prisoner was going to die regardless owing to the injuries sustained and said that Gallagher misspoke as none of the procedures shortened the prisoner's life.
