= Derrick Miller =

Former U.S. Army National Guard sergeant and convicted murderer

- Born: 1983 or 1984 (age 42–43); Frederick, Maryland, U.S.
- Employer: US Army National Guard (former)
- Title: Sergeant (former)
- Status: Released
- Conviction: Premeditated murder
- Penalty: Life imprisonment; commuted to 20 years imprisonment

Details
- Date: September 26, 2010
- Locations: Masamute Bala, Laghman Province, north-eastern Afghanistan
- Killed: 1
- Weapon: 9 mm Beretta handgun
- Date apprehended: 2010
- Imprisoned at: United States Disciplinary Barracks (2011–2019)

Derrick Miller (born 1983/1984) is a former US Army National Guardsman sergeant who was sentenced in 2011 to life in prison with the chance of parole for the murder of an Afghan civilian during a battlefield interrogation. Miller is colloquially associated with a group of U.S. military personnel convicted of war crimes known as the Leavenworth 10. After being incarcerated for eight years, Miller was granted parole and released in 2019. He currently serves as the Executive Director of the Justice for Warriors Caucus and was the Military Adviser to Texas Republican U.S. Representative Louie Gohmert.

== Early life ==
Miller's parents are his mother Reneé Myers, and his step-father Craig Myers. He was raised in Frederick, Maryland, attended Frederick High School, and later lived in Hagerstown, Maryland. He was a security guard at Fort Detrick in Maryland. Miller has two daughters, who live in Maryland.

== Military career ==
Miller was a Maryland Army National Guard sergeant. He joined the National Guard in 2006, volunteered for three combat deployments to Iraq and Afghanistan, and had top performance reviews. His wife said he was given Army Commendation Medals and Army Achievement Medals for his military service.

=== Shooting ===
On his third tour of duty, for which he had volunteered, Miller was assigned to a Connecticut National Guard unit, and attached to the US Army's 101st Airborne Division. Miller was on a combat mission in a Taliban-controlled area in Masamute Bala, in Laghman Province, in north-eastern Afghanistan on September 26, 2010.

He was warned that day that his unit's base had been penetrated. An Afghan man suspected of being an enemy combatant was brought to Miller for interrogation. Miller said that during the battlefield interrogation the suspect, who he believed was an insurgent, tried to grab his 9 mm Beretta handgun, and that he shot the man in self-defense. The military later identified the man as Atta Mohammed. The base was attacked shortly after as Miller become aware of the planned attack and was able to rally the forces to counter the attack.

Miller's lawyer told the jury that Miller stopped the man for questioning when the man walked through a defensive perimeter that Miller's unit had set up around a mortar unit, infiltrating the base. He said that upon being questioned the man made inconsistent statements, Miller believed the man could be a threat to Miller's unit who was scouting the area for the Taliban, that during questioning the man tried to grab Miller's weapon, and that during the ensuing struggle Miller shot and killed the man. A platoon sergeant testified that as a result of the interrogation of the suspect the unit came to believe that a Taliban attack was imminent and heightened its security, and that within an hour the unit was in fact attacked, with the sergeant crediting Miller's interrogation of the man with saving the lives of American soldiers, his lawyer said.

A witness Guardsman from Maryland testified that he heard Miller threaten to kill the man if he did not tell the truth, and that he then straddled the man, who was lying on his back, before shooting him in the head. Matt Calarco, a prosecuting lawyer, said during closing arguments: "Immediately following the event the accused said, 'I shot him. He was a liar.'"

=== Court martial ===
Miller was tried in a court martial trial. After under three hours of deliberation, a 10-member jury of military members at Fort Campbell, Kentucky, convicted him in July 2011, finding him guilty of premeditated murder of a civilian. He was sentenced to life in prison. Miller was incarcerated at the Fort Leavenworth military Disciplinary Barracks, beginning in July 2011.

=== Sentence reduction and parole ===
In June 2017, Texas Republican U.S. Representative Brian Babin asked President Donald Trump in a letter to order a review of Miller's case and the cases of other veterans who fought in Afghanistan and Iraq who were imprisoned for battlefield crimes. Miller also received support from Maryland Democratic US Representative Elijah Cummings. In April 2018 Texas Republican U.S. Representative Louie Gohmert testified at a hearing, supporting Miller.

After a clemency hearing in July 2018, the Army Clemency and Parole Board reduced Miller's sentence to 20 years. That made him eligible for parole. Retired Marine Lieutenant Colonel David "Bull" Gurfein, who served in Afghanistan and both Gulf Wars and is the CEO of United American Patriots, a nonprofit organization that lobbies for service members accused of battle crimes in war zones, said: "He's a super individual. He made the right decision, he followed the rules of engagement.... Anyone who looks into the details of the case will see an injustice has been done."

After being incarcerated for eight years, subsequent to a parole hearing Miller was granted parole and was released on May 20, 2019.

Miller was the Executive Director of the Justice for Warriors Caucus and Military Adviser to Congressman Louie Gohmert.

== See also ==
- Michael Behenna, former US Army first lieutenant convicted of 2008 murder during occupation of Iraq; sentenced to 25 years imprisonment; received a pardon from President Trump in 2019.
- Clint Lorance, former US Army first lieutenant convicted of 2012 second-degree murder for two battlefield killings in Afghanistan; sentenced to 20 years imprisonment; received a pardon after six years from President Trump in 2019.
