= William A. Shine Great Neck South High School =

Great Neck South High School
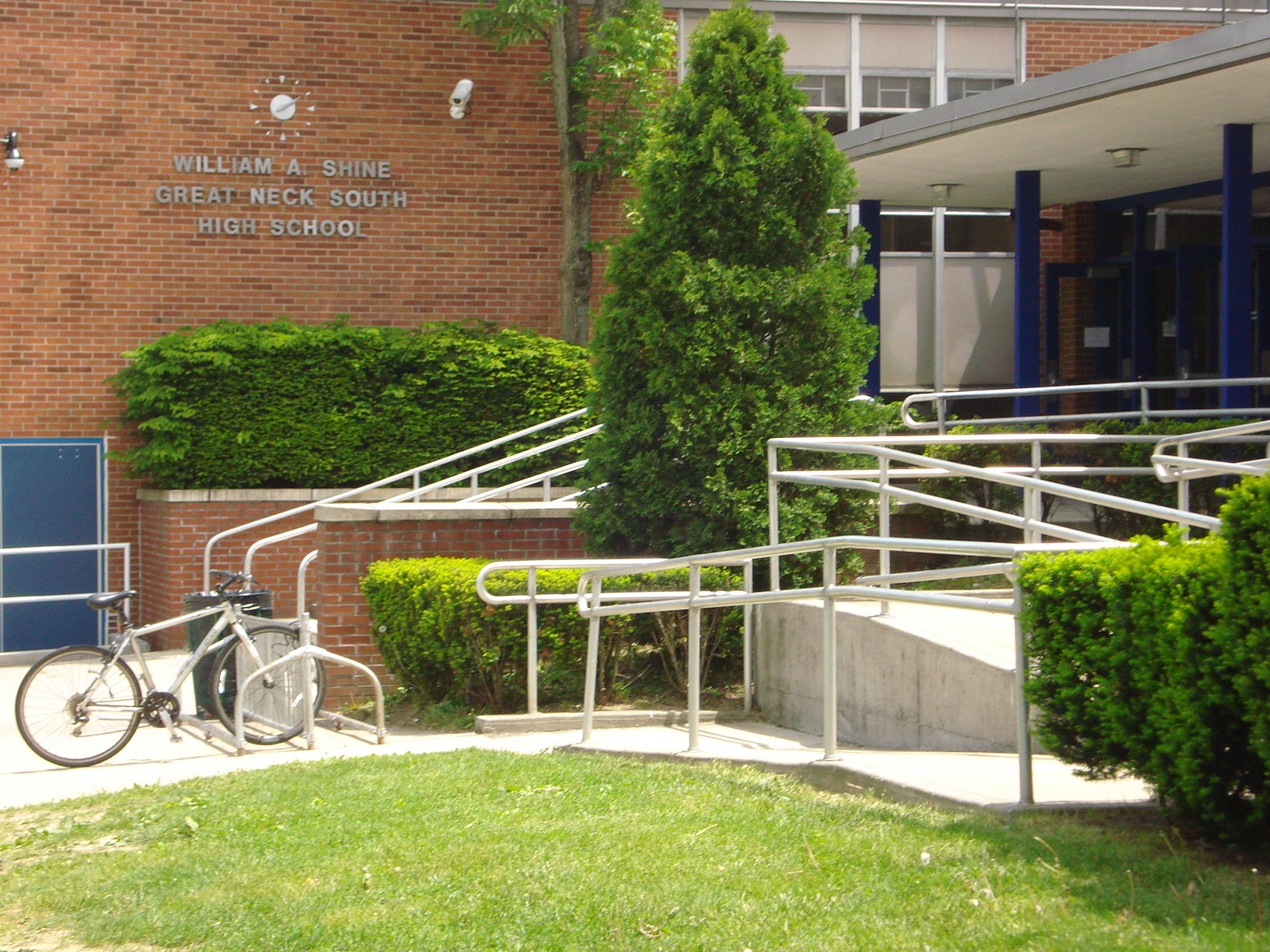

Location
- 341 Lakeville Rd; Lake Success, New York 11020; United States
- 40°45′53″N 73°41′55″W

Information
- Type: Public
- Established: 1958
- School district: Great Neck Public Schools
- NCES School ID: 361251001018
- Principal: Thomas DePaola
- Teaching staff: 117.61 (on an FTE basis)
- Grades: 9-12
- Enrollment: 1,322 (2023-2024)
- Student to teacher ratio: 11.24
- Campus: Suburban: Large
- Colors: Blue and Orange
- Mascot: Rebels
- Newspaper: The Southerner
- Yearbook: Vista
- Website: shs.greatneck.k12.ny.us

William Aloysius Shine Great Neck South High School (commonly Great Neck South, South High School, or GNSHS) is a four-year public high school located in the Village of Lake Success, New York, on the bottom of the Great Neck Peninsula. The school serves students in grades 9 through 12 residing within the Great Neck School District.

Great Neck South is one of three public high schools in the Great Neck school district, alongside Great Neck North High School and Great Neck Village High School. Great Neck South offers its students academic acceleration, along with special education classes for students with disabilities. The school opened in 1958 and was named Great Neck South High School until 2006.

As of the 2023-2024 school year, the school had an enrollment of 1,322 students and 117.61 classroom teachers, on an FTE scale, for a student–teacher ratio of 11.24:1. In the same academic year, 276 students were eligible for free lunch and 27 were eligible for a reduced-cost lunch.

== History ==
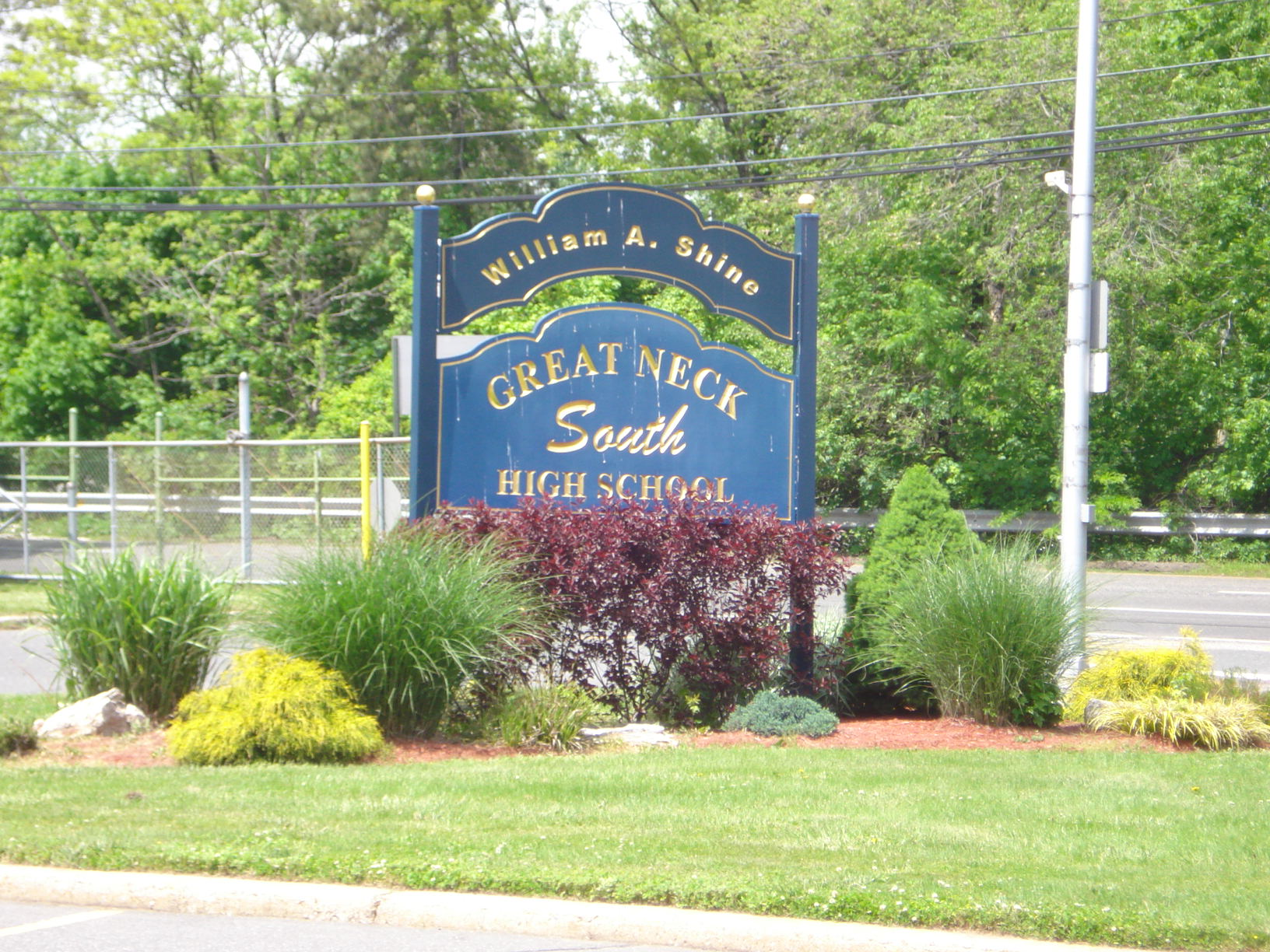
A sign at South High School of the school's name

In 1949, the Great Neck School District acquired the 124-acre (0.50 km^{2}) South complex in Lake Success from the former estate of Henry Phipps Jr. – a steel mogul and one-time partner of Andrew Carnegie. His mansion and 9 acres (36,000 m^{2}) were given to the district by the Phipps heirs; the mansion is now the Phipps Administration Building. The rest of the property was purchased for $279,000. In 1957, South High School was built on property surrounding the administration building. When the estate was donated, there was a stipulation that part of it be kept in its natural state, a condition that was met during construction. The school was designed by the New York-based firm of LaPierre, Litchfield & Partners.

One of the final remaining intact portions of the Long Island Motor Parkway, the first road in the United States built solely for automobiles, runs through the campus of the High School.

In 1958, Great Neck Senior High School was renamed Great Neck North High School to differentiate it from the district's new Great Neck South High School. Prior to 1979, Great Neck South High School included grades 10 through 12. In 1980, grade 9 was added. In 2006, the school was renamed to honor Dr. William A. Shine for his respected status and work as superintendent in the Great Neck School District.

Prior to 1980, all students were allowed an open campus. In 1980, the school decided that younger students at Great Neck needed more restrictions than older students. Beginning in 1980, only 11th and 12th graders at Great Neck South had open campus privileges. More recently, Great Neck South is a closed campus, although upperclassmen are still allowed increased mobility on campus grounds.

=== Mascot and flag history ===
Prior to the early 1980s, South High School used a Confederate battle flag as part of its logo, along with a gray Confederate rebel representing it as a mascot. Great Neck South quarterback David Gurfein, from the Class of 1983, recalled, “We would go down to Middle Neck Road waving these confederate flags. We had so much team spirit, so much unity, so much energy.”

While the flag has ties to the Confederate South, the school and town alike did not identify it with the flag's history, but rather saw it solely as a representation of school spirit, and a pun of it being Great Neck's "southern" high school rather than any purposeful ill intent. After the 1981 lynching of Michael Donald in Mobile, Alabama, and being made aware of the flag's history seeing contemporary pictures of the Ku Klux Klan with it in the background, Gurfein regretted the mascot and flag use, and led a successful effort to replace the Confederate flag and soldier with a more generic American Revolutionary War rebel and Betsy Ross flag.

== Academics ==
Newsweek ranked Great Neck South High School 49th out of 500 in its 2011 list Best High Schools in America. (The school has been cited in Newsweek's public school rankings on several other occasions). Students are offered Advanced Placement, honors, and accelerated courses as well. Great Neck South’s disabled students attend special education classes. One of the Advanced Placement physics courses tested the audience response technology which was successful and the Great Neck School District has expanded the technology to other schools.

The majority of South High students (more than 90%) achieve a B average or better. 98% of the South High School Class of 2019 entered college. 19% were recognized as finalists or received Letters of Commendation from the National Merit Scholarship Corporation.

== Events ==
=== Cultural heritage ===
One of the most popular events at Great Neck South is Cultural Heritage Night, where students put on a two-hour extravaganza of multicultural art, theater and dance.

=== Blazing Trails-4-Autism ===
Great Neck South has hosted the Blazing Trails-4-Autism on its campus. In 2009 the Run/Walk was selected to be a part of the USATF-Long Island Grand Prix of Long Island Road Races.

=== Rebel War ===
Rebel War is a tradition in which the four teams, divided by graduation year, compete for fun. Events include speedball and tug of war. The members of each team dress in their corresponding team colors and work to design a class banner for their teams. In years prior to 2023, the school's annual Rebel War has been cancelled due to COVID.

== Enrollment ==
=== Demographics ===
As of the 2021–22 school year, the student body of 1,222 (49.8% male, 50.2% female) consists of:

- 843 Asian or 69%
- 11 Black or African American students or 0.9%
- 102 Hispanic or Latino students or 8%
- 243 White students or 20%
- 23 multiracial students or 2%

The student population at Great Neck South is predominantly Asian American, with a large White minority and smaller Hispanic and Latino Americans and African American minorities.

=== Grade distribution ===
As of the 2021–22 school year the grade distribution is:

- Grade 9: 288
- Grade 10: 300
- Grade 11: 307
- Grade 12: 327

== Notable alumni ==
- Scott Aharoni: film producer and director
- Dan Ahdoot: comedian, star of Super Fun Night
- Earl Beecham: National Football League player
- Danielle Bernstein (class of 2010), fashion designer and social media influencer
- Nikki Blonsky, actress, Hairspray
- Peter de Sève, illustrator and animator
- Quinn Early (class of 1983), National Football League player
- Stuart Ewen, author
- Jamie Gorelick, former Deputy Attorney General of the United States
- Mark Green (class of 1963), New York City politician
- David Gurfein: U.S. Marine Corps lieutenant colonel, and CEO of nonprofit organization United American Patriots
- Mark Kelman, Stanford Law School professor
- David Miner, Emmy Award-winning executive producer of NBC's 30 Rock
- Roy Niederhoffer (class of 1983), founder and president of R. G. Niederhoffer Capital Investments, Inc., and chairman of the New York City Opera
- Bruce Paltrow, writer, television and movie producer, husband of Blythe Danner, and father of Gwyneth Paltrow
- John Schulman, cofounder of OpenAI, led creation of ChatGPT, chief scientist at Thinking Machines
- David Seidler, playwright
- Amanda Setton (class of 2003), actress, Gossip Girl, One Life to Live, and General Hospital
- Sarah Sherman (class of 2011), comedian and SNL cast member since its 47th season (2021)
- Talia Shire, actress, co-starred in the first five Rocky films
- Bob Simon, TV correspondent
- Helen Slater, actress, singer, songwriter (transferred to the High School of Performing Arts)
- Dawn Steel, movie studio executive
- Jon Taffer (class of 1972), star of SpikeTV's Bar Rescue, and inventor of NFL Sunday Ticket
- Charles Williams (class of 1965), former major league baseball pitcher for the New York Mets (1971) and the San Francisco Giants (1972–78)
- Alexander Wissner-Gross (class of 2000), research scientist and entrepreneur

== See also ==
- Education in the United States
