= The Wheatley School =

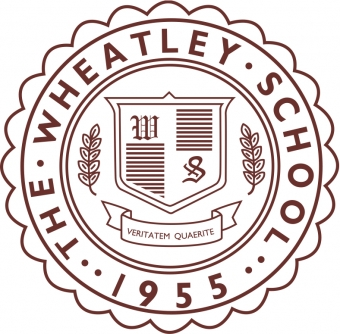

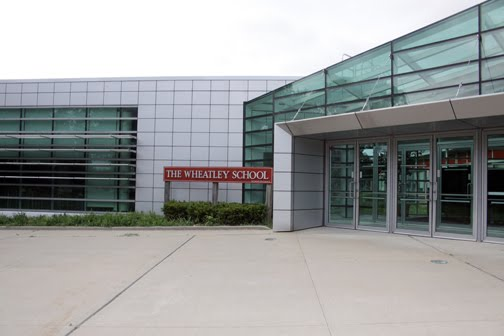
- The Wheatley School's front entrance in 2012

Location
- 11 Bacon Road; Old Westbury, New York 11568; United States; 40°45′44″N 73°36′58″W

Information
- Funding type: Public school
- Motto: Veritatem Quaerite (Seek the Truth)
- Established: 1956
- Locale: Suburb: Large
- School district: East Williston School District
- NCES District ID: 3610050.
- Superintendent: Danielle Gately
- CEEB code: 334293
- NCES School ID: 361005000781.
- Principal: Wayne Jensen
- Faculty: 63.87 FTEs
- Enrollment: 711 (as of 2018-19)
- Student to teacher ratio: 11.13:1
- Campus type: Suburban
- Colors: Red, White
- Sports: Baseball, Basketball(Boys/Girls), Cross Country(Boys/Girls), Fencing(Boys/Girls), Field Hockey(Girls), Football, Golf, Ice Hockey(Boys), Lacrosse(Boys/Girls), Soccer(Boys/Girls), Tennis (Boys/Girls), Track and Field(Boys/Girls), Volleyball(Girls), Wrestling
- Mascot: Wildcat
- Team name: Wildcats
- Rival: Roslyn High School
- Accreditation: Middle States Association of Colleges and Schools
- National ranking: Newsweek: 92, U.S. News & World Report:246
- Publication: Literary Magazine (Vintage)
- Newspaper: Wildcat
- Yearbook: Aurora
- Feeder schools: Willets Road School
- Website: tws.ewsdonline.org//

The Wheatley School (historically known as East Williston Junior–Senior High School) is a public high school serving grades 8 through 12 located in Old Westbury, New York. It is the East Williston Union Free School District's sole high school. The school district encompasses all of East Williston and parts of Mineola, Albertson, Old Westbury, and Roslyn Heights.

== History ==
The school opened in 1956 as East Williston Junior–Senior High School. It was designed by the Manhattan-based architectural firm, LaPierre, Litchfield & Partners. The single-story school was designed to allow for easy building expansion, should the need arise.

== Demographics ==
As of the 2018-19 school year, the school had an enrollment of 711 students and 63.87 classroom teachers (on an FTE basis), for a student–teacher ratio of 11.13:1. There were 37 students (5.2% of enrollment) eligible for free lunch and 1 student (0.1% of students) eligible for reduced-cost lunch.

== Notable alumni ==
- Carol Alt - model/actress/author
- Rick Berman - executive producer of several of the Star Trek television series
- Arthur Engoron - Justice, New York State Supreme Court, New York County
- Steve Witkoff - real estate developer, US Special Envoy
- Todd Glickman - radio meteorologist
- Rick Hoffman - actor
- Winnie Holzman - creator of My So Called Life, writer of thirtysomething and Wicked
- Anthony Katagas - Oscar-winning film producer
- Michael D. Ratner - entrepreneur and film producer
- Stephanie Klein - blogger and writer
- Nicole Krauss - writer
- Stefan P. Kruszewski - clinical and forensic psychiatrist, fraud investigator
- Ned Lagin - musician
- Carol Leifer - Seinfeld writer, comedian
- Mike Masters - professional soccer player
- Carlos Mendes - professional soccer player
- Shep Messing - professional soccer player
- Larry Nagler (born 1940) – tennis player
- Dave Rothenberg - sports radio host, ESPN
- Steven Rubenstein - anthropologist
- Daniel Schwartz - CEO of Burger King
- Anita Silvers - philosopher, interested in medical ethics, bioethics, feminism, disability studies
- Ian H. Solomon - Dean of Frank Batten School at the University of Virginia, former Executive Director of the World Bank.
- Steven Starr - filmmaker, media activist
- Mitchell Stephens - journalist and professor of journalism and mass communications at New York University
- Todd Strasser - writer
- Dan Weiss - CEO of the Philadelphia Museum of Art

== See also ==
- East Williston Union Free School District
