= LaPierre, Litchfield & Partners =

Practice information
- Founded: 1954
- Dissolved: 1970s
- Location: New York City

Significant works and honors
- Buildings: Drew University; Great Neck South High School; Lebanon Correctional Institution; The Wheatley School

LaPierre, Litchfield & Partners was a major 20th-century architectural firm headquartered in Manhattan, New York, United States. The firm was best known for designing modernist civic institutions & facilities throughout the United States and abroad. It was especially active within the New York metropolitan area.

== Description ==
The firm was founded in 1954 by architects Frank Bower, Gannett Herwig, Lester S. LaPierre, Clarence B. Litchfield, and Ben John Small – all five of whom were formerly associates with the firm of Alfred Hopkins & Associates. Following Alfred Hopkins' death in 1941, LaPierre and Litchfield took over, with the firm continuing to operate under the Hopkins & Associates name until 1954 – at which time LaPierre, Litchfield & Partners was founded as its successor.

Throughout the firm's existence, it designed scores of schools, hospitals, prisons, and other major institutions & facilities – in addition to commercial buildings and over 2,000 public housing units. The firm also designed numerous federal facilities – including multiple VA hospitals. It was known for being a pioneer in modernist architecture, as well as for its civic & military buildings – including for work at the United States Merchant Marine Academy in Kings Point, New York. It was also known for its prison designs, with Litchfield being regarded as one of the nation's leading prison architects.

In 1966, Gannett Herwig, one of the firm's founding partners, died. At the time, the firm was headquartered at 8 West 40th Street in Manhattan.

The firm dissolved in the 1970s, in the midst of an economic downturn.

== Notable works ==
- Drew University (Madison, New Jersey, 1955)
- Great Neck South Middle–High School (Lake Success, New York, 1956)
- The Wheatley School (Old Westbury, New York, c. 1956)
- Lebanon Correctional Institution (Lebanon, Ohio, 1957)
- James T. Vaughn Correctional Center (Smyrna, Delaware, 1970)

== See also ==
- Frederic P. Wiedersum Associates
- Eggers & Higgins
- Kahn & Jacobs
