= Michael Behenna =

Former US Army officer (born 1983)

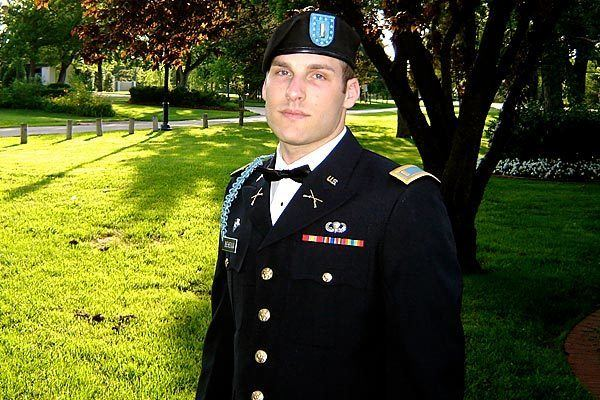
- Born: May 18, 1983 (age 43); Edmond, Oklahoma, U.S.
- Education: University of Central Oklahoma
- Occupations: First Lieutenant, Platoon Leader
- Employer: U.S. Army
- Organization(s): 101st Airborne Division, 5th Platoon, Delta Company of the 1st Battalion, 327th Infantry Regiment
- Known for: War crimes
- Status: Pardoned
- Allegiance: United States of America
- Conviction: Unpremeditated murder
- Penalty: 25 years imprisonment; commuted to 15 years imprisonment

Details
- Victims: Ali Mansur Mohamed
- Date: May 16, 2008
- Location: Iraq
- Date apprehended: July 31, 2008

Michael Chase Behenna (born May 18, 1983) is a former United States Army First Lieutenant who was convicted of the 2008 murder of Ali Mansur Mohamed during the occupation of Iraq. Behenna is colloquially associated with a group of U.S. military personnel convicted of war crimes known as the Leavenworth 10. He was sentenced to 25 years imprisonment, which was later reduced to 15 years, and served his sentence in the United States Disciplinary Barracks on Fort Leavenworth, a United States Army post in Kansas. He was granted parole on March 14, 2014, after serving less than five years of his sentence. Since his release from prison he has worked as a farmhand. On May 6, 2019, Behenna received a pardon from President Donald Trump.

== Early life and education ==
Michael Behenna was born on May 18, 1983, to Scott Behenna, an FBI intelligence analyst and retired Oklahoma State Bureau of Investigation special agent, and Vicki Behenna, a federal prosecutor who had worked on the Oklahoma City bombing case. He attended Will Rogers Elementary School where he met his future girlfriend, Shannon Wall.

Behenna graduated from Edmond North High School in 2002 and, after witnessing the September 11th attacks, expressed interest in enlisting in the U.S. Army, wanting to "fight terrorists" and "work his way up from the bottom". His parents persuaded him to instead go to college and enroll in an Army ROTC program. Behenna chose University of Central Oklahoma and graduated in 2006, with a degree in General Studies minoring in history and military science.

== Military career ==
Behenna was commissioned as a second lieutenant in the United States Army upon graduation from college. He attended Infantry Officer Training and was then selected to attend the U.S. Army's Ranger School. Behenna was assigned to the 101st Airborne Division as the platoon leader for 5th Platoon, Delta Company of the 1st Battalion, 327th Infantry Regiment and deployed to Iraq in 2007.

During his tour of duty in Iraq, Behenna's platoon conducted counterinsurgency operations in the Salahuddin province with a focus on the towns of Mezra, Hajaj and Butoma. Behenna made efforts to develop ties with local Iraqis as part of his counter-insurgency mission and, already fluent in Spanish, began to teach himself Arabic. He was known to host cookouts with his platoon for local interpreters, engage with civilians on the street and encouraged his soldiers to learn about Iraqi culture and to eat their food. This desire to interact with locals caused some friction within his platoon, with one soldier commenting:

He would talk to random civilians, anyone. He was the type of guy that liked Iraqis. That was the only annoying thing about him. He was always about saving the country.

On April 21, 2008, Behenna's platoon was returning to their base with two detainees when their convoy was hit by an IED. One of the platoon's MRAPs was destroyed and two soldiers, specialists Adam Kohlhaas and Steven Christofferson, were killed and several others grievously wounded. The loss of his men weighed heavily on Behenna who at one point broke down in tears over the incident during a group therapy session.

On May 5, Behenna received information on a man suspected by military intelligence to be working for Al-Qaeda in Iraq, which they believed was responsible for the April 21 attack. Acting on this intelligence, Behenna's platoon raided a house in Butoma where they found the man identified by military intelligence, Ali Mansur Mohamed, along with a cache of ammunition, an RPK light machine gun and a passport with Syrian visas. After securing Mansur and collecting the arms cache, Behenna's platoon returned to base with Mansur and turned him over to military intelligence agents for questioning.

Less than two weeks later, Mansur was ordered released due to military intelligence having insufficient evidence to hold him any longer. Behenna's platoon was tasked with the return of Mansur to town as soon as possible. On May 16, while returning the prisoner to a checkpoint as ordered, Behenna and his platoon stopped at a bridge in the northern oil refinery town of Baiji and, with the help of his Iraqi interpreter, nicknamed "Harry", tried to question Mansur on the April 21 attacks. According to the interpreter:

Lieutenant Behenna started talking with Ali Mansur and Sergeant Warner followed them.
Behenna and Warner started taking off Ali Mansur's clothes with their knives.

They then cut his handcuffs.
Ali Mansur said I will talk to you
but Lieutenant Behenna pulled trigger and killed him
Before we started the patrol,
Lieutenant Behenna told to Ali Mansur 'I will kill you'.
I thought Lieutenant Behenna was trying to scare him.
I did not think he would go through
I was standing 10 metres back during the shooting
I could see everything even if it was getting dark
and Sergeant Warner was next to me.
He took the grenade from his pocket, pulled the safety ring, walked around
and put the grenade under Ali Mansur's head.

Then they hid his clothes, and Behenna and Warner went back.

— Harry

When questioned at Behenna's trial, the interpreter admitted that he did not see exactly what transpired immediately before the shooting.

Two U.S. soldiers from the same battalion as the accused also testified against Warner. Corporal Cody Atkinson said that Behenna and Warner, armed with a grenade, took Mansur out of the vehicle and under the bridge, and that "Warner told us to write that Ali Mansur had been released". Sergeant Milton Sanchez said Behenna "did not think that we should release him".

According to Behenna, his actions were in self-defense and he describes the situation as such in an interview.

After the killing, Behenna ordered the platoon back to the base and the next day local villagers found Mansur's naked, burned body in the culvert. On July 31, 2008, Behenna was relieved of his command and charged with the premeditated murder of Ali Mansur Mohamed. In November 2008, Behenna was returned to Fort Campbell and assigned to security duties pending a court-martial.

== Court-martial ==
After Behenna's Article 32 hearing, his family hired defense attorney Jack Zimmerman, a former United States Marine, military trial judge and Vietnam veteran. The prosecution, led by Captain Erwin Roberts, made its opening statements on February 23, 2009. The prosecution's two principal witnesses were Iraqi interpreter "Harry" and Staff Sergeant Warner. Warner struck a plea bargain with the prosecution where he agreed to plead guilty to assault, maltreatment of a subordinate and making a false statement in exchange for not being charged with premeditated murder and for his future testimony against Behenna. The defense contended that Behenna was under an acute stress disorder as a result of the attacks on his platoon and that during the shooting he had acted in self-defense after Mansur lunged at him. After less than three and a half hours of deliberation, the jury came back finding Behenna not guilty of making a false declaration and premeditated murder, but guilty of UCMJ Article 118, unpremeditated murder and sentenced to 25 years' confinement.

=== Appeals and release ===
Pardon of Michael Behenna

Behenna's appeal, arguing that the government failed to disclose Brady material in the form of the prosecution's forensic analyst Herbert MacDonell's statements to the defense that his analysis of the wounds corroborated Behenna's accounting of the shooting as being self-defense, was rejected in a 3–2 decision by the United States Court of Appeals for the Armed Forces on July 5, 2012. The defense contended that MacDonnell had told the prosecution that Behenna's story was consistent with the forensic evidence and that they needed to alert the defense of that fact under the ruling of the Supreme Court in Brady v. Maryland. MacDonnell also told defense attorney Zimmerman that he would have "made a great witness for him". Zimmerman confronted the prosecution about any potential information they might possess about Behenna, but the prosecution denied being aware of any.

Upon post-trial evidence of these series of events, a former senator, several former U.S. Attorneys and States Attorneys General, law professors, and lawyers wrote to the Secretary of the United States Army, Pete Geren, asking for a retrial.

After learning that the prosecution had not passed on his information, MacDonnell also signed several motions for mistrial. After reviewing the defense's initial motion, a military judge declined to declare a mistrial, but a military panel reviewed the case and decided to reduce Behenna's sentence to 20 years. After the Behenna family appealed to the Army's Clemency and Parole Board, Michael Behenna's sentence was again reduced, this time to 15 years. His second clemency request was denied in December 2010.

On February 12, 2014, another request for clemency was denied, but Behenna was granted parole and released on March 14, 2014, after serving less than five years of his sentence.

On May 6, 2019, Behenna was granted a full pardon by U.S. President Donald Trump.

== See also ==
- Clint Lorance, former U.S. Army first lieutenant convicted of 2012 second-degree murder for two battlefield killings in Afghanistan; sentenced to 20 years' imprisonment; incarcerated at Fort Leavenworth; pardoned and released after six years.
- Derrick Miller, U.S. Army Sergeant sentenced to life in prison for premeditated murder of Afghan civilian during battlefield interrogation; granted parole and released after 8 years.
