= Earl Beecham =

American football player (born 1965)

No. 26
- Position: Running back

Personal information
- Born: September 8, 1965 (age 61); New York City, New York, U.S.
- Listed height: 5 ft 8 in (1.73 m)
- Listed weight: 180 lb (82 kg)

Career information
- High school: Great Neck South (Great Neck, New York)
- College: Bucknell (1983–1986)
- NFL draft: 1987: undrafted

Career history
- New York Giants (1987); New York Jets (1988)*
- * Offseason or practice squad member only
- Stats at Pro Football Reference

Earl Fitzgerald Beecham (born September 8, 1965) is an American former professional football player who was a running back for one season with the New York Giants of the National Football League (NFL). He played college football for the Bucknell Bison.

== Early life and college ==
Earl Fitzgerald Beecham was born on September 8, 1965, in New York City. He attended Great Neck South High School in Great Neck, New York.

Beecham was a member of the Bucknell Bison of Bucknell University from 1983 to 1986 and a three-year letterman from 1984 to 1986.

== Professional career ==
Beecham went undrafted in the 1987 NFL draft. On September 23, 1987, he signed with the New York Giants during the 1987 NFL players strike. He played in one game for the Giants, rushing five times for 22 yards while also returning three kicks for 70 yards. Beecham was released on October 19, 1987, after the strike ended. He also spent time with the semi-pro Connecticut Giants in 1987.

Beecham signed with the New York Jets on May 3, 1988. He was released on August 8, 1988.
