= Clint Lorance =

Former U.S. Army officer, and convicted war criminal (b. 1984)

- Born: Clint Allen Lorance; December 13, 1984 (age 41); Hobart, Oklahoma, U.S.
- Education: University of North Texas (BA); Appalachian School of Law (JD)
- Occupation: U.S. Army first lieutenant in the 4th Brigade Combat Team of the 82nd Airborne Division
- Status: Pardoned
- Allegiance: United States
- Convictions: Unpremeditated murder (2 counts); Attempted murder Wrongfully communicating a threat Reckless endangerment Soliciting a false statement Obstruction of justice
- Penalty: 20 years imprisonment; commuted to 19 years imprisonment

Details
- Date: July 2, 2012
- Locations: Kandahar Province, Afghanistan
- Target: Afghans
- Killed: 2

Clint Allen Lorance (born December 13, 1984) is a former United States Army officer who is known for having been convicted and pardoned for war crimes related to the killing of two Afghan civilians.

While serving as a first lieutenant in the infantry in the War in Afghanistan with the 4th Brigade Combat Team of the 82nd Airborne Division in 2012, Lorance was charged with two counts of unpremeditated murder after he ordered his soldiers to open fire on three Afghan men who were on a motorcycle. He was found guilty by a court-martial in 2013 and sentenced to 20 years in prison (later reduced to 19 years by the reviewing commanding general). He was confined in the United States Disciplinary Barracks at Fort Leavenworth, Kansas for six years.

In 2015, Lorance became a cause célèbre among conservative commentators and activists. Fox News personalities, in particular Sean Hannity, advocated for Lorance to be pardoned. Lorance was eventually pardoned by President Donald Trump on November 15, 2019.

== Early life ==
Lorance was born and raised in the small town of Hobart, Oklahoma, and lived in Jackson County, Oklahoma. His father Tracy is a welder, and his mother Anna was a stay-at-home mom.

After a deployment in Iraq, he attended the University of North Texas, and graduated in 2010, becoming the first college graduate in his family. Lorance then lived in Celeste, Texas, and Merit, Texas, in Hunt County.

== Military career ==
On his 18th birthday in 2002, Lorance enlisted in the U.S. Army. He was stationed first in South Korea for two years as a traffic officer, and then in Iraq, where he served for 15 months guarding detainees. After graduating from college with his bachelor's degree, he was commissioned as a second lieutenant in 2010, and subsequently promoted to first lieutenant. In March 2012 he was deployed to a small outpost in southern Afghanistan with the 4th Brigade Combat Team, 73rd Cavalry Regiment, of the 82nd Airborne Division.

Another lieutenant in the 4th Brigade Combat Team was wounded in a roadside bombing by shrapnel; one of four injuries the platoon suffered in a matter of days. The 28-year-old was chosen as his replacement, and became the platoon leader of 1st Platoon, C Troop.

In his short time as Platoon Leader, Lorance engaged in tactics that drew scrutiny at his later court-martial. On June 30, 2012, Lorance threatened a farmer and a small boy by pointing a rifle at the boy. On July 1, 2012, Lorance ordered two of his soldiers to fire at the villagers and instructed one of his NCOs to provide a false report to the Troop TOC (Tactical Operations Center).

== Shooting of unarmed Afghan men ==
Early on July 2, 2012, Lorance and his patrol went on his second combat patrol, with most of his two dozen soldiers on foot. The patrol entered the same location in which they had been fired upon, in a dangerous valley in a Taliban-controlled area of Zhari District in Kandahar Province in southern Afghanistan.

In a post-conviction legal filing, a U.S. government contractor, Kevin Huber, claimed to have observed the area through cameras on a stationary blimp. He wrote: "I saw three fighting-aged males shadowing the American patrol at a distance of about 300 meters (980 ft). In my experience, they had every indication of Taliban or insurgent fighters because they were armed with AK-47 assault rifles and using ICOM radios while moving along the back wall of the village toward the American position." According to the Army Times article reporting Huber's claim, "Court records do not indicate that those motorcyclists—if they were indeed the same ones who Lorance later ordered soldiers to shoot—were armed at the time of the shooting." Daniel Gustafson, who served as the Battalion command sergeant major over Lorance's platoon, testified that he was 100 percent confident that Lorance's platoon was being scouted for an impending attack. He noted that:

"the three Taliban scouts riding the motorcycle approached Lorance’s platoon from the Northeast ... several insurgents were using ICOM radios and maneuvering into fighting positions to the North, and ... a motorcycle rider came down to the West who was stopped, detained, and was found to have [homemade explosive material] on his hands".

Three unarmed Afghan men on a motorcycle were spotted near the platoon. Lorance said that the motorcycle was just seconds away from his troops. His soldiers testified that the motorcycle was spotted approximately 600 feet (180 m) away, and several testified that the motorcycle could not have reached the platoon's position. Attorneys for Lorance attempted to cast doubt on four of the soldiers' accounts, arguing that they were granted immunity from prosecution in exchange for their testimony. The other five soldiers who testified against Lorance did not receive immunity.

One of Lorance's soldiers asked if it was acceptable to open fire on the men on the motorcycle, and Lorance, suspecting the approaching men were insurgents, responded "yes." Private David Shilo said: "I was given a lawful order." At trial, Private Skelton was attributed as spotting the motorcycle and he stated that "there was no reason to shoot at that moment in time that presented a clear, definitive hostile intent and hostile act."

The American soldier opened fire and missed. The three Afghans then dismounted and walked towards the Afghan National Army soldiers who were at the front of the mixed US-Afghan patrol. The three men's hands were visible; they carried no weapons. The Afghan soldiers gestured for the three men to leave. The three men turned around to leave. Lorance then asked a second U.S. soldier (in a gun truck) to open fire, who did and killed two of the Afghans while the third ran away. Sergeant Williams, a squad leader in the platoon, who was watching this unfold immediately radioed "What the hell just happened? There was no threat from those guys whatsoever."

Lorance initially told his soldiers "That was fucking awesome". Lorance later said: "I made the best decision I could make, given the conditions on the ground. I would make the same exact decision again today if I was faced with that decision."

== Court-martial proceedings ==
Lorance was investigated after the soldiers in his platoon reported the incident. Lorance was charged nine months later, though the soldiers who fired the shots were not themselves charged. He was tried in August 2013 in Fort Bragg, North Carolina. Nine members of his platoon testified against him.

Lorance never testified in the court hearings, though he did take responsibility for his men's actions. Lorance's lawyer said Lorance's actions were justified by the threat level at the time, by the information conveyed to him by Army helicopter pilots that insurgents were loitering on three sides of the platoon, and by intelligence reports that men on motorcycles were presumed to be Taliban members, which led him to believe that the men on the motorcycle were Taliban suicide bombers and an imminent threat.

At the end of a three-day trial, in August 2013 the 28-year-old Lorance was found guilty by a military judge of two counts of second-degree murder, obstruction of justice, and other charges "related to a pattern of threatening and intimidating actions toward Afghans" as the platoon's leader. He was sentenced to 20 years in prison, forfeiture of all pay, and dismissal from the Army.

=== Appeals and post-conviction developments ===
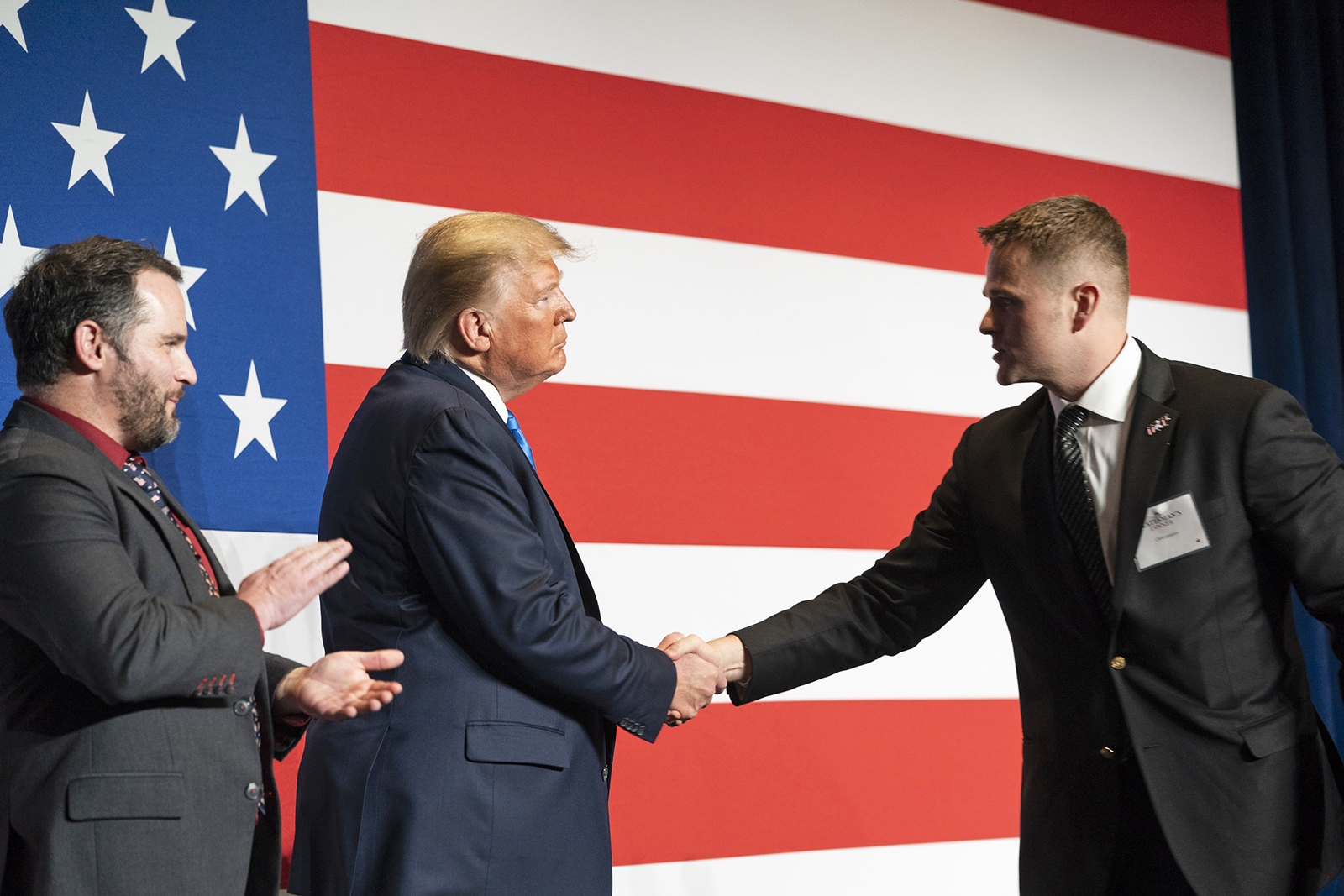
Lorance greeting President Donald Trump in December 2019

In December 2014, an attorney for Lorance filed pleadings alleging that Lorance was the victim of prosecutorial misconduct. On January 5, 2015, the Commanding General of the 82nd Airborne Division, Major General Richard D. Clarke, completed a review, upheld Lorance's conviction, and directed one year off Lorance's original sentence of 20 years' confinement due to post-trial delay.

United American Patriots (UAP), a non-profit group that defends U.S. soldiers accused of war crimes, assisted Lorance on his appeal. The group, led by retired Marine Corps lieutenant colonel David Gurfein, said it assists the accused personnel it believes might not be receiving due process. The publicity spurred by Lorance's case helped the UAP increase its fundraising by 150%.

In September 2015, defense attorneys filed a petition with the U.S. Army Court of Criminal Appeals for a new trial, arguing that evidence linking the two killed Afghans to terror networks was left out of Lorance's court-martial proceedings. They argued that biometric evidence showed that one of the men on the motorcycle was linked to an improvised explosive device incident prior to the shooting, a second rider was also involved in an insurgent attack, and the third rider was connected to a hostile action against U.S. troops. The U.S. Army Court of Criminal Appeals rejected Lorance's appeal in June 2017, ruling that the evidence would not have been admissible at trial, and even if it had, it would not have helped Lorance's case.

Having exhausted his direct appeals, Lorance filed for post-conviction relief from his court-martial convictions in federal district court. Three days later, President Trump issued a full and unconditional pardon to Lorance. Lorance accepted the pardon, resulting in his release from custody.

== Pardon ==
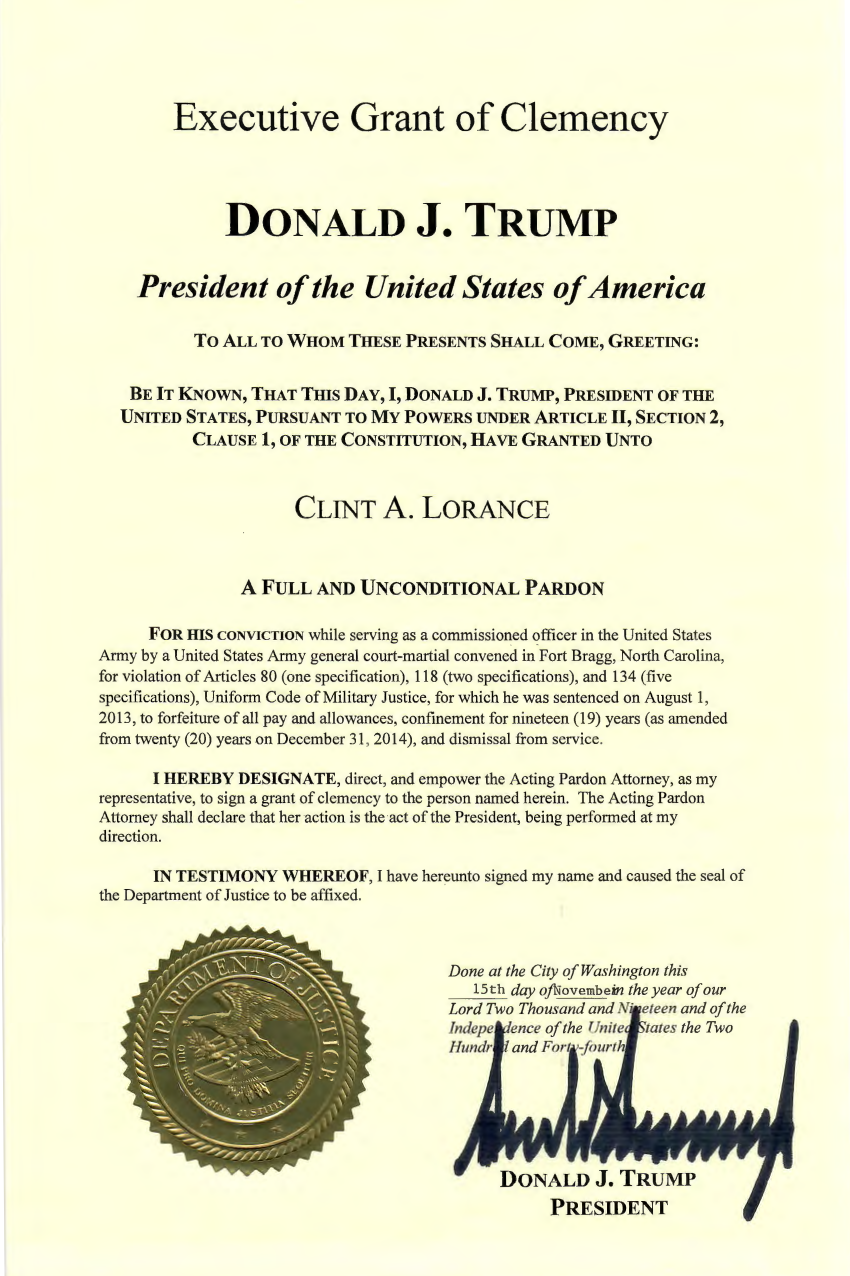
Pardon of Clint Lorance

=== Campaign for pardon ===
Lorance became a cause célèbre among conservative commentators and activists. In January 2015, supporters of Lorance created a petition on the White House website asking President Barack Obama to grant a presidential pardon to Lorance. It received 124,966 signatures. In its response to the petition, the White House said that requests for executive clemency for federal offenses should be directed to the Office of the Pardon Attorney in the U.S. Department of Justice.

=== Supporters of pardons ===
==== Republican Party of Louisiana ====
In 2017 the Republican Party of Louisiana passed a unanimous resolution in 2017 in support of Lorance's exoneration, despite Lorance having no obvious tie to the state. Senators Bill Cassidy and John Kennedy, as well as Representatives Garret Graves, Mike Johnson, Clay Higgins, Ralph Abraham, and Steve Scalise all called upon Trump to release Lorance. At Trump's direction, Graves called Lorance's mother from Air Force One on November 14, 2019, to tell her about the impending pardon.

==== Illinois Joint Resolution ====
In 2015, a bipartisan joint resolution was introduced into committee in the Illinois legislature calling for President Barack Obama to exercise his powers as commander-in-chief and send the Lorance case to a new trial. The resolution failed and was never sent to the president.

==== Congressional caucus forms ====
Representative Louie Gohmert founded the Congressional Justice for Warriors Caucus with the goal to reform the Uniform Code of Military Justice. On August 9, 2019, Louie Gohmert, Ralph Norman, Scott Perry, Duncan D. Hunter, Jody Hice, Paul Gosar, Mark Meadows, Brian Babin, Daniel Webster, and Steve King sent a letter to the Army Clemency and Parole Board urging Lorance's release.

==== Judge Advocate General's investigation ====
On October 21, 2019, nine members of the Congressional Justice for Warriors sent a letter to Secretary of the Army Ryan McCarthy urging the Secretary to launch in investigation as to the conduct of Brigadier General Joseph B. Berger III, then the Chief Judge of the Army Court of Criminal Appeals. The letter alleges violations of "ethical canons of judicial conduct."

In March 2019, one of Lorance's defense attorneys, lawyer and author Don Brown, published a book entitled Travesty of Justice: The Shocking Prosecution of Lt. Clint Lorance. In it he argued that the Army did not permit the jury to consider evidence showing that Afghan National Army soldiers accompanying Lorance's patrol began firing at the motorcycle first, and that the Army kept biometric evidence from the jury suggesting that the motorcycle riders were Taliban bomb makers. However, Brown's claims have not been substantiated in other reviews, which suggest that the motorcycle riders were civilians and that the men with Taliban connections merely share the same name as those killed. Brown frequently urged on Fox News that President Donald Trump should free Lorance.

In October 2019, Lorance's case was featured in the Starz documentary series Leavenworth, the only documentary known to exist featuring footage inside the secretive United States Disciplinary Barracks.

=== Trump pardon ===
On November 15, 2019, President Donald Trump issued a full pardon to Lorance, and he was released from prison after serving six years. Fox News covered Lorance extensively prior to the pardon. Fox News hosts Sean Hannity and Pete Hegseth were reportedly instrumental in persuading Trump to pardon Lorance. Many Republican members of Congress had urged Trump to grant executive clemency. Trump described Lorance as a hero operating in difficult circumstances. The soldiers of his platoon described their disbelief and compared it to a nightmare. Military officials worried that the decision to overturn a case that had already been adjudicated in the military courts sent a signal that war crimes were not worthy of severe punishment.

=== Pardon Case ===
Following Lorance's pardon, the U.S. government moved to dismiss Lorance's motion for post-conviction relief, arguing, among other things, that Lorance's release from custody rendered his habeas petition moot. Lorance responded that his petition was not moot because he continued to suffer collateral consequences from his convictions. The district court agreed that Lorance continued to suffer collateral consequences but deemed the habeas petition moot nonetheless, concluding that Lorance's acceptance of the presidential pardon constituted a legal confession of guilt and thus a waiver of his habeas rights, and granted the government's motion to dismiss, and this appeal followed.

Lorance appealed the District Court's decision and in September 2021, the United States Court of Appeals for the Tenth Circuit in Denver issued a ruling in Lorance's habeas corpus petition, concluding that Lorance’s acceptance of the pardon did not have the legal effect of a confession of guilt and did not constitute a waiver of his habeas rights. Despite Lorance’s release from custody pursuant to the pardon, the appeals court concluded, Lorance had sufficiently alleged ongoing collateral consequences from his convictions, creating a genuine case or controversy and rendering his habeas petition not moot. The case was reversed and the matter remanded back to the United States District Court for the District of Kansas for further proceedings.

== Life after release from prison ==
=== Public statements ===
Following his release, Lorance appeared on national media thanking Trump and accusing leaders at the Pentagon of being part of the "deep state." Lorance also appeared in late 2019 at a political fundraising event in Florida with President Trump and in early 2020 at another in Chicago where he toured a congressional district speaking on behalf of dairy magnate, state senator and congressional candidate Jim Oberweis.

=== Publications ===
In September 2020, Center Street published his memoir Stolen Honor: Falsely Accused, Imprisoned, and My Long Road to Freedom. In the book, Lorance claims to have been made a "scapegoat for a corrupt military hierarchy." In June 2021, Lorance published his second book Conservative Millennial Playbook.

=== Law school ===
In 2020, Lorance became a student in the Appalachian School of Law in Grundy, Virginia, where he graduated on May 13, 2023. In the summer of 2023, Todd Fitzgerald, a former soldier who witnessed Lorance’s crimes in Afghanistan, spearheaded an online campaign to protest his admission to the Oklahoma bar. This protest, covered extensively by media outlets, followed Lorance's graduation from law school and subsequent completion of the bar exam in July 2023, and called upon objectors to contact the Oklahoma Board of Bar Examiners and urge them to deny Lorance admission to practice law. As of 2026, Lorance is licensed to practice law in Missouri.

== See also ==
- Michael Behenna, former U.S. Army first lieutenant convicted of 2008 murder during occupation of Iraq; sentenced to 25 years' imprisonment; received a pardon from President Trump in 2019
- Derrick Miller, U.S. Army sergeant sentenced to life in prison for premeditated murder of an Afghan civilian during battlefield interrogation; granted parole and released after 8 years
- List of people pardoned or granted clemency by the president of the United States
