= Todd Glickman =

American meteorologist

Todd Glickman (born June 13, 1956) is an American meteorologist whose weather reports were heard on WCBS Newsradio 880 in New York City. He was fill-in meteorologist at the station from May 1979 until the station ended its all-news programming in 2024.

== Early years ==
Glickman grew up in Howard Beach, Queens and then Roslyn Heights, Long Island, NY. He attended Sands Point Academy through sixth grade, then public school in the East Williston School District, graduating from The Wheatley School in 1973. He attended the Massachusetts Institute of Technology (Cambridge, MA), and received the S.B. degree with a major in Earth and Planetary Sciences in 1977. He studied under Professor Frederick Sanders and researcher Norman Macdonald, with whom he authored a paper on atmospheric convection. Mid-career, he attended Suffolk University (Boston, MA) and received the MBA from its Executive Program in 1988.

== Career ==
While an undergraduate at MIT, Glickman interned at Boston's WBZ-TV from 1975–1977, under meteorologists Norm Macdonald, Bruce Schwoegler, and Don Kent. Since he had radio weather experience from MIT's student radio station WTBS (now WMBR), when Norm Macdonald left WBZ and started the radio division of Weather Services Corporation in Bedford, MA, he asked Glickman to work part-time. After graduation, Glickman spent a year as safety director at Pierce Coach Line of Roslyn, NY, a school bus company co-owned with Pierce Country Day Camp. In 1978, Glickman accepted a part-time position with Weather Services Corporation (WSC) of Bedford, MA, and worked various shifts serving radio stations nationwide. Continuing at WSC part-time through 1993, he was heard on dozens of radio stations, including WCBS (New York City), WEEI (Boston), WRKO (Boston), WTOP (Washington, DC), KPRC (Houston), WDGY (Minneapolis), KFWB (Los Angeles), and KCMO (Kansas City). In 1979, Glickman joined Weather Services International Corporation of Bedford, MA, a start-up company in the value-added, real-time weather information business. He held a number of positions there, including media marketing manager, manager of new product development, and manager of the Government Program Office. In 1993, he joined the American Meteorological Society (Boston, MA) as assistant executive director. In 2000, Glickman joined the staff of the Massachusetts Institute of Technology in the Office of Corporate Relations Industrial Liaison Program. He was initially hired as an industrial liaison officer, and was promoted to senior industrial liaison officer in 2003 and associate director of corporate relations in 2006. In 2012, he was promoted to senior associate director of corporate relations, and in 2017 to senior director.

He has held a number of consulting assignments, including voice-over artist for Boston-area video production houses, per diem reporter for CBS Radio news, and aviation weather instructor for the US Airways Shuttle.

== Awards and certifications ==
Glickman has been honored with several awards over the course of his career. He was elected a Fellow of the American Meteorological Society (AMS) in 1995, and received the Society's "Special Award" for his work as Managing Editor of the Glossary of Meteorology, second edition, in 2000. He was awarded the AMS's Seal of Approval for Radio Weathercasting in 1979, and its new Certified Broadcast Meteorologist designation in 2005. He has served on and chaired a number of AMS Committees, including the Board of Broadcast Meteorology, Board of Aviation Meteorology, Board of Continuing Education, and Board of Private Sector Meteorology. He serves as the Chair of the AMS Board of Broadcast Meteorology Certification Appeals Committee, and on the Society's Commission on Weather and Climate Enterprise Steering Committee.

== Other interests ==
Glickman engages in a number of community volunteer activities. Since 1979, he has been an on-air host of the WGBH-TV "Channel 2 Auction", the Boston-area Public Broadcasting Service (PBS) public television station annual pledge drive. Since 1988, he has been an officer and docent at the Seashore Trolley Museum of Kennebunkport, ME, most recently serving as an Instructor for the Museum's operating fleet of streetcars, rapid transit vehicles, and historic buses. He has also served as an officer and trustee of the Technology Broadcasting Corporation (and its predecessor the WTBS Foundation, Inc.), the licensee of MIT's radio station WMBR since 1981.

As of 2025, Glickman is retired -- WCBS radio shut down in August 2024, and he retired from the staff at MIT. Currently he is serving pro-bono as corporate Secretary of the American Meteorological Society as well as continuing to volunteer at the Seashore Trolley Museum as its Chief Instructor, trustee of WMBR Radio, and on the board of directors of the Market Street Railway in San Francisco.
