= Duncan D. Hunter =

American politician (born 1976)

Duncan Hunter
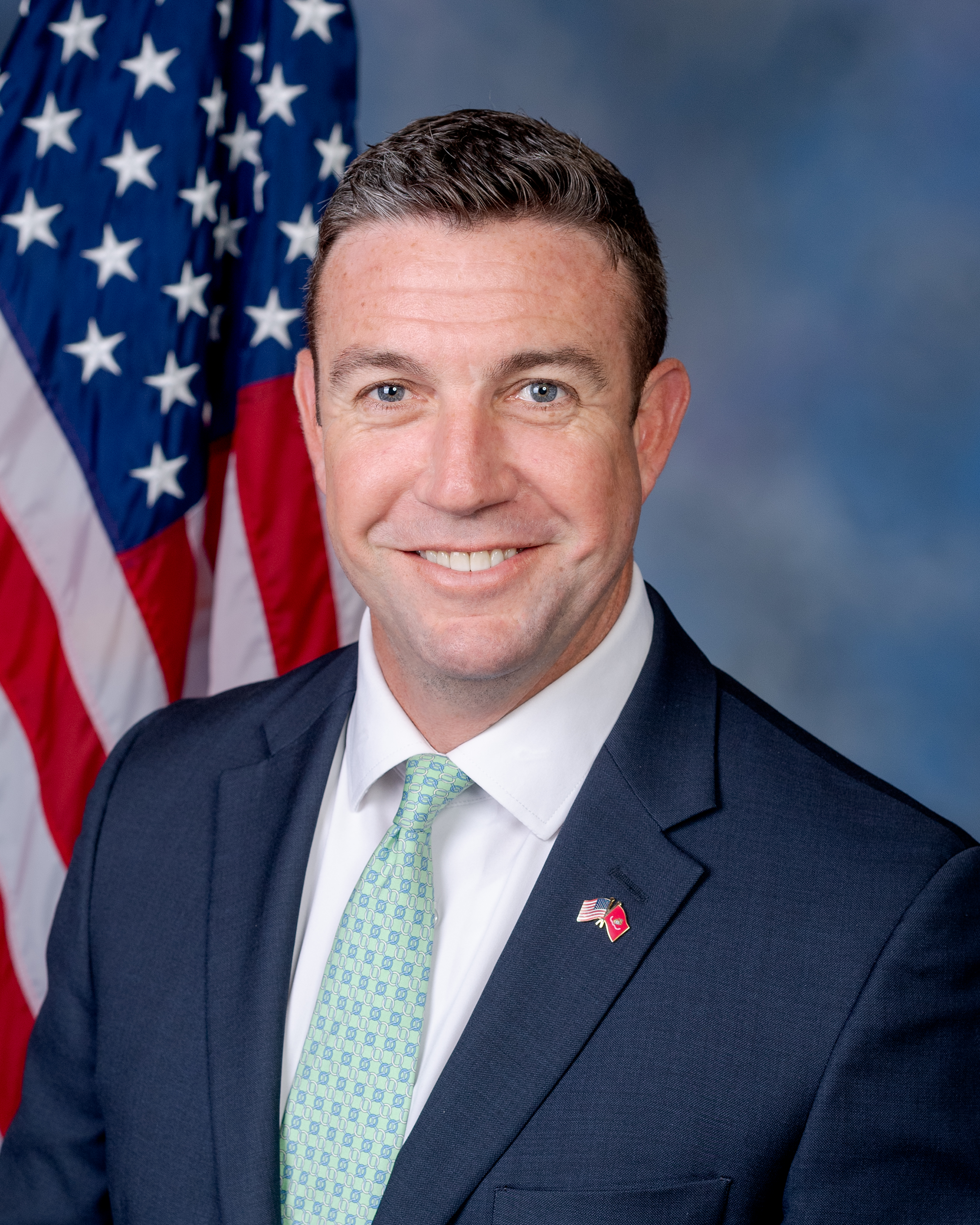
- Official portrait, 2019

Member of the U.S. House of Representatives from California
- In office January 3, 2009 – January 13, 2020
- Preceded by: Duncan L. Hunter
- Succeeded by: Darrell Issa
- Constituency: 52nd district (2009–2013); 50th district (2013–2020)

Personal details
- Born: Duncan Duane Hunter; December 7, 1976 (age 49) San Diego, California, U.S.
- Party: Republican
- Spouse: Margaret Jankowski (m. 1998; div. 2023)
- Children: 3
- Relatives: Duncan L. Hunter (father)
- Education: San Diego State University (BS)

Military service
- Branch/service: United States Marine Corps
- Years of service: 2001–2005 (active); 2005–2017 (reserve)
- Rank: Major
- Unit: 1st Battalion, 11th Marines
- Battles/wars: War in Afghanistan; Iraq War
- Criminal details
- Criminal information
- Status: Pardoned
- Criminal charge: Conspiring to convert Hunter campaign funds to personal use
- Penalty: 11 months in federal prison, no time served due to Presidential Pardon
- Hunter's voice Hunter explaining his amendment to prohibit raising prices at Defense Commissaries; Recorded June 10, 2015

Duncan Duane Hunter (born December 7, 1976) is an American former politician and United States Marine who served as a U.S. representative for California's 50th congressional district from 2013 to 2020. A member of the Republican Party, he was first elected to the House in 2008, and was the first combat veteran of the Iraq War to be elected to Congress. His district, numbered as the 52nd from 2009 to 2013, encompassed much of northern and inland San Diego County and a sliver of Riverside County, including the cities of El Cajon, Escondido, San Marcos, Santee and Temecula. He served in the U.S. Marines from 2001 through 2005 and succeeded his father, Republican Duncan Lee Hunter, a member of Congress from 1981 to 2009.

In 2017, the Department of Justice began a criminal investigation into Hunter and his campaign manager and wife, Margaret Jankowski, for alleged campaign finance violations.

The 2017 investigation was challenged by Hunter and denied. In August 2018, both were indicted on charges including conspiracy, wire fraud, and violating campaign finance laws. In June 2019, Jankowski pleaded guilty to conspiring to use campaign funds for personal expenses and named him as a co-conspirator.

Also in June 2019, federal prosecutors showed that from 2009 to 2016, Hunter had spent campaign funds on extramarital affairs with five women, including lobbyists and congressional staff. In December 2019, Hunter changed his plea to guilty on one count of misusing campaign funds in exchange for prosecutors dismissing the remaining 59 counts.

On January 7, 2020, he submitted letters of resignation to House Speaker Nancy Pelosi and California Governor Gavin Newsom, that took effect on January 13, 2020. On March 17, 2020, Hunter was sentenced to 11 months in prison, which had been scheduled to begin in January 2021. Hunter did not serve any time because he was pardoned by President Donald Trump in December 2020.

The pardon followed a letter from former Federal Election Commission Chairman Bradley Smith, who criticized the prosecutors and advised that the case should have resulted in a civil penalty rather than criminal charges. The Times of San Diego reported that the letter and Hunter's father played a role in the decision to grant the pardon. The next day, Trump also pardoned Hunter's wife. Among Margaret's criminal charges was attending, at campaign expense, the First Lady's Luncheon, hosted by the President's wife.

== Early life and education ==
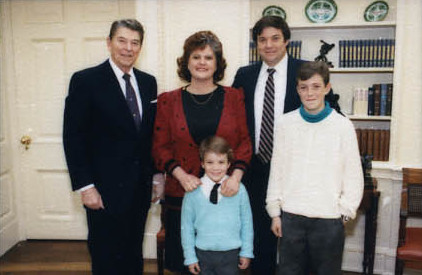
The Hunter family (Helynn Louise, Duncan Lee, and children) with President Ronald Reagan on January 12, 1989

Hunter was born in San Diego, California, the son of Helynn Louise (née Layh) and Duncan Lee Hunter. He graduated from Granite Hills High School in El Cajon, California, in 1994, and San Diego State University, where he earned a B.S. in information systems in 2001. During his sophomore year of college, Hunter started a web design company with a friend. After graduation, he worked in San Diego as an information technology business analyst.

== Military service ==
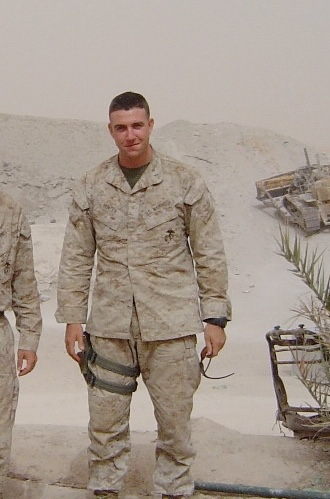
1LT Duncan Hunter, Fallujah, Iraq, 2004

After the September 11 attacks, Hunter joined the United States Marine Corps. He attended Officer Candidates School at Marine Corps Base Quantico. When he graduated in March 2002, he was commissioned as a second lieutenant. He subsequently served as a field artillery officer in the 1st Marine Division after the 2003 invasion of Iraq.

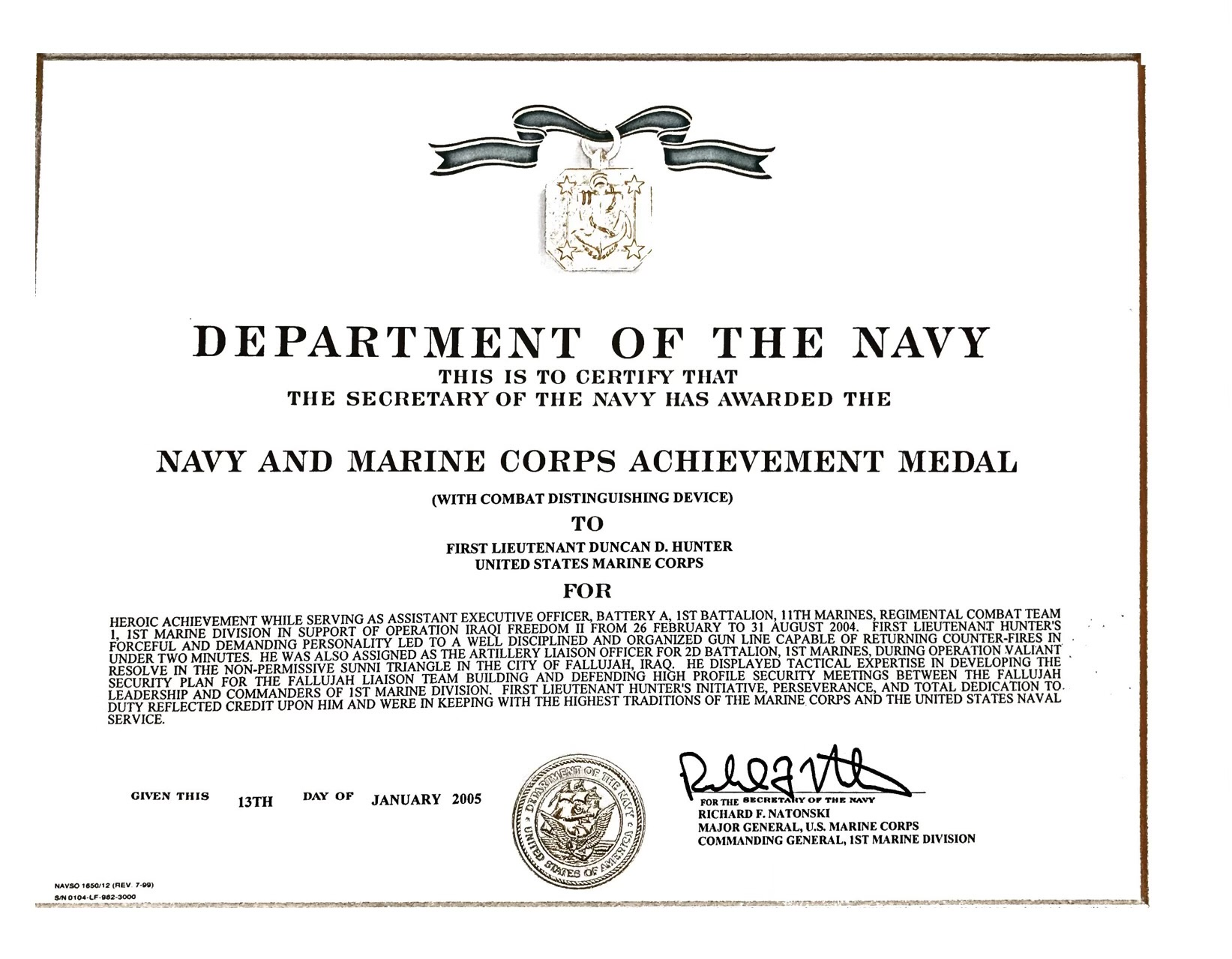
The Navy and Marine Corps Achievement Medal (with Combat Distinguishing Device) awarded to Lt. Hunter, during the 2004 Battle for Fallujah

He completed a second tour in Fallujah, Iraq, in 2004, serving in Battery A, 1st Battalion, 11th Marines. During his second tour, he participated in Operation Vigilant Resolve, in which he fought in battles in Fallujah. Hunter was working in a command center on April 12, 2004, that mistakenly approved the mortar launch onto a schoolhouse in Fallujah where U.S. troops had set up a temporary base. Two U.S. Marines and an Iraqi interpreter were killed by the 81 mm mortar. Among the dozen wounded were three who were so seriously injured that they had to be medically retired.

In September 2005, Hunter was honorably discharged from active duty. After his discharge he started a residential development company.

In 2007, he was recalled to active duty and deployed to Afghanistan. He was promoted to captain during his wartime deployments as an artillery officer in 2006, and to major in 2012. Hunter remained in the Marine Corps Reserve until 2017.

In April, 2023 NPR reported that General Gregg Olsen had initially implicated Hunter in a deadly friendly fire mishap, that occurred in Iraq in 2004, but retracted the statement in a subsequent interview after secondary news sources, including the Times of San Diego had picked it up. In an updated report in the same month, NPR reported. A military investigation of the incident was never made public, nor was it released by NPR. "Olsen, who approved the mortar shot, recently reported that Duncan D. Hunter had pointed to the wrong target on a map, although that detail is not in his statement in the 2004 investigative report. As Olsen described it, Hunter's misidentification was the first step in the command center confusion that resulted in the tragedy. Yet, after this story was initially published, Olsen invited NPR back to the Pentagon for a follow-up interview and said he wanted to clarify his story about Hunter. He said it was another officer's mistake that triggered the mishap. "I didn't have it right the first time I talked to you," he said. Of Hunter Jr., he said, "I don't recall him pointing to anything."

== U.S. House of Representatives ==
=== Elections ===
2008

On March 20, 2007, Hunter's father, Duncan Lee Hunter, announced that as part of his presidential bid he would not seek re-election to the House of Representatives in 2008, retiring from Congress after 14 terms.

After Hunter announced his candidacy for his father's seat, he was recalled by the United States Marine Corps to serve in the War in Afghanistan. On June 3, 2008, Hunter won the Republican primary with 72% of the vote in a four-candidate field and became the Republican nominee to replace his father, representing the 52nd District.

In the general election, Hunter defeated Democratic nominee Mike Lumpkin, a former Navy SEAL, 56%–39%. Hunter became the first combat veteran of either Iraq or Afghanistan to serve in the U.S. Congress; moreover, he was the first Marine to be elected who had seen combat in both conflicts.

2010

Hunter won re-election to a second term with 63% of the vote, defeating Democrat Ray Lutz and Libertarian Michael Benoit.

2012

After redistricting, Hunter's district was renumbered as the 50th District. It was pushed well to the east to cover most of inland San Diego County, while losing its share of the city of San Diego.

In the five-candidate open primary in 2012, Hunter ranked first with 67% of the vote; Democratic nominee David Secor ranked second with 17% of the vote. In the general election, Hunter defeated Secor 68%–32%. He became only the third person to represent this district since its creation after the 1960 census. Lionel Van Deerlin won the seat on its creation in 1962, and held it until the elder Hunter defeated him in 1980.

2014

In the primary election, Hunter finished first with 62,371 votes (70%) to Democrat James H. Kimber's 21,552 (24%). In the general election, Hunter defeated Kimber by 111,997 votes (71%) to 45,302 (29%).

2016

In the primary election, Hunter took 56.5% of the vote against four opponents. In the general election, he defeated Democrat Patrick Malloy, 63.9% to 36.1%.

2018

Several Democrats challenged Hunter, including Ammar Campa-Najjar and Josh Butner. Hunter was also challenged by the Republican Mayor of El Cajon, Bill Wells. In the jungle primary, Hunter received the most votes at 47.4%, followed by Campa-Najjar at 17.6%. The two faced off in the November general election.

During Hunter's 2018 re-election campaign, he repeatedly attacked his Democratic opponent Campa-Najjar over his half-Palestinian heritage. He claimed that Campa-Najjar, who converted to Christianity from Islam in high school, was an "Islamist" trying to "infiltrate Congress", describing him as a "security threat" with terrorist ties. The Washington Post fact-checkers wrote that an October 1, 2018, television ad by Hunter's campaign used "naked anti-Muslim bias" and sought to scare Californians from voting for Campa-Najjar, despite the fact that Campa-Najjar "isn't even Muslim. All the claims in the ad are false, misleading or devoid of evidence." Hunter also claimed that Campa-Najjar was being supported by CAIR and the Muslim Brotherhood; PolitiFact gave this claim its "Pants on Fire" rating. CNN, The Guardian, BuzzFeed News, and The Daily Beast described Hunter's campaign as "anti-Muslim", Vox described it as "race-baiting", and The Atlantic called it "one of the most brazenly anti-Muslim smear campaigns in recent history." After Hunter's attacks on Campa-Najjar were widely condemned, Hunter doubled down on the attacks in a direct mail letter written and signed by three defense industry lobbyists, characterizing Campa-Najjar as a national security risk. Campa-Najjar described Hunter's attacks as "pathological." After the salvo of criticism protesting Hunter's accusation of Campa-Najjar's funding from extremist Muslim groups, The San Diego Union Tribune reported that while CAIR, The Council on American Islamic Relations, had not organizationally contributed to Campa-Najjar, seven members of CAIR's board of directors and staff had contributed US$17,300 to Campa-Najjar. The San Diego Union Tribune further reported, "CAIR was found to have ties to Hamas, the Palestine-Islamic resistance organization. .

Hunter ultimately won with 51.7% of the vote, the closest race in the district since his father's initial run for what was then the 42nd District in 1980, when he unseated longtime Democratic incumbent Lionel Van Deerlin with 53 percent of the vote. In the four decades since then, a Democrat had only managed more than 40 percent of the vote in 1992, when the elder Hunter was held to 52.8 percent of the vote. Although the district is normally considered safely Republican, as evidenced by Hunter's previous wide margins of victory, the election was relatively close largely due to Hunter's indictment. He was left as one of only three Republicans representing a district south of Bakersfield, the others being Paul Cook and Ken Calvert.

=== Tenure ===
According to GovTrack, Duncan Hunter was ranked the 3rd top leader among the 53 members of the California congressional delegation during the 113th Congress in 2014. He was also ranked the 4th most politically right-leaning among the same group. He received bipartisan cosponsors on the 7th highest percentage of bills compared to all 435 members of the House. GovTrack noted that 78% of Hunter's 23 bills and resolutions had both Democratic and Republican cosponsors.

In the 114th Congress, GovTrack lowered Hunter's leadership ranking within the California delegation from 3rd to 9th. However, he remained active in other categories such as receiving the bipartisan cosponsors on the 2nd most bills among California members.

Hunter also ranked 30th among 248 House Republicans for obtaining influential cosponsors. GovTrack noted that seven of Hunter's bills and resolutions in the 114th Congress had a sponsor who was either a chair or ranking member of a committee relevant to the bill's subject matter.

Four of Hunter's bills were classified as maritime-related. These coincided with his role as chair of the Coast Guard Subcommittee, where he supported Coast Guard funding. However, one of his most publicized legislative efforts involved the naming of a U.S. Navy ship.

In 2011, Hunter introduced a bill directing the Secretary of the Navy to name a ship after Marine Sgt. Rafael Peralta. During the battle of Fallujah, Sgt. Peralta was mortally wounded and covered a grenade with his body, saving fellow Marines. He was nominated for the Medal of Honor, but the award was downgraded to the Navy Cross. Then–Secretary of Defense Robert Gates followed Pentagon recommendations that Peralta's head injury had likely rendered him incapable of conscious action.

Hunter disputed this conclusion and introduced legislation to name a Navy ship after Peralta. The bill passed the House on May 28, 2011, and was included in the National Defense Authorization Act. The legislation passed the Senate on December 15, 2011, and was signed into law by President Obama on December 31, 2011, as part of a $662 billion defense bill.

On February 12, 2012, Secretary of the Navy Ray Mabus announced that a Navy destroyer would be named the USS Rafael Peralta. The ship was commissioned on July 29, 2017, in San Diego. At the commissioning, Hunter's statement was read by his father, including a message to Peralta's mother indicating that efforts to secure the Medal of Honor were continuing.

Hunter continued to challenge the Pentagon's conclusions over a three-year period, contacting three secretaries of defense. At one point, he sent Peralta's body armor to the Pentagon to highlight blast marks and the embedded grenade fuse. Despite these efforts, the Pentagon did not change its position, and the Medal of Honor was not awarded. The USS Rafael Peralta remains as the result of the legislation.

In July 2013, Hunter voted against an amendment offered by Justin Amash to rein in warrantless domestic surveillance conducted by the NSA. In October 2013 Hunter was the only representative from San Diego County to vote against the bill ending the nation's 16-day partial government shutdown, explaining that he voted against it because it did not reduce spending or the national debt.

On January 6, 2017, Hunter removed a picture from the wall of the U.S. Capitol hallway. The picture, posted pursuant to a student art contest, depicted police officers with pig faces shooting an unarmed protester. The picture drew objections from Law enforcement groups. Hunter arrived with a screwdriver, took down the picture and returned it to the office of its congressional sponsor, Rep. Lacy Clay. Some police organizations cheered Hunter's actions. The picture was put back up, removed again, and stayed down pursuant to a ruling from the architect of the Capitol, Stephen Ayers.

Hunter was an early supporter of Donald Trump's presidential bid, endorsing him in February 2016 in the earliest days of the Republican primary. He was the second member of Congress to support him.

At a town-hall-style meeting in March 2017, Hunter was confronted by protesters. Before the crowd, Hunter asserted that the American intelligence community was filled with "seditious Obama folks" who "hate Donald Trump as much as you [those at the meeting] do" and are trying to undermine the Trump administration. He also described the American government as "Orwellian".

In April 2019, he pretended to cross the Mexico–United States border, in a bid to show that it was easy for immigrants to enter into the country. Hunter's Democratic challenger, Ammar Campa-Najjar, pointed out that actually leaving the country would violate the terms of Hunter's pretrial release after he was indicted on illegal spending of campaign funds. In the video, Hunter says he is at "the grand border wall in Yuma, Arizona," while standing next to a waist-high barrier near the border. Hunter indicated that the small barrier was in fact the border wall and elaborated that "This is what we expect to stop people, transnational terrorists, families, all illegal aliens from coming across the border. This is it." He then proceeded to step over the wall and declare "There you go. That's how easy it is to cross the border in Yuma, Arizona." The Border Patrol released a statement correcting Hunter's claims and said that the "border wall" was actually a vehicle barrier 70–100 ft from the actual border which follows the Colorado River. Hunter had asked to stop at the barrier while on a courtesy ride-along. A month after Hunter's visit criticizing the Yuma Sector's porous border, the Border Patrol announced, on May 22, 2019, that The Yuma Sector had surpassed 50,000 illegal crossings and apprehensions, making it the 3rd most illegally crossed border sector in the nation.

In 2019, the Marine Corps sent a cease-and-desist letter to Hunter, asking him to immediately stop using the Marine Corps Eagle, Globe, and Anchor emblem and a Corps motto on political mailers to constituents. A spokesman for the Marines explained that the Eagle, Globe, and Anchor are trademarked and that federal law bars the use of the Marine seal and emblem for political purposes. Hunter used the Marine iconography in a racially charged mailer attacking his Democratic opponent and two Muslim congresswomen, attempting to link them to terrorism. Hunter had served three tours of duty with the Marines following the September 11 attacks.

After Trump pulled 1,000 U.S. troops from Kurdish-held territory on the Syrian border south of Turkey in 2019, a bipartisan resolution was passed in the House, 354–60, that condemned the president for abandoning those U.S. allies that would allow the Islamic State of Iraq and the Levant (ISIL) to reestablish and regroup its forces, and allow the Turks to attack the YPG. Hunter was one of the two from the 53-member California congressional delegation to vote against the resolution.

Committee work

On August 22, 2018, after being indicted on 60 federal charges, Hunter was forced to resign from all of his Congressional committees and subcommittees.

- Committee on Armed Services: Hunter took up what he considered injustices by the Pentagon in its treatment of a number of America's warriors. For Marine Sgt. Rafael Peralta, posthumously denied the Medal of Honor, Hunter drafted legislation directing the Navy to name a ship after the fallen sergeant. His legislation became law, and the USS Peralta was commissioned on July 29, 2017.
- Committee on Education and the Workforce: as the chairman on the K-12 subcommittee of the Education Committee, on May 13, 2011, introduced legislation, HR 1891, "Setting New Priorities in Education Spending" that would eliminate 43 federal spending programs, shifting education control back to the States, stating, "It's time to cut the fat". The chairman of the full Education Committee, John Kline stated in a committee press release, "Rep. Hunter's legislation will reduce the Federal role in education and help set the stage for increased flexibility at the state and local level." Hunter's legislation followed a March 10, 2011 meeting with President Obama and seven other education leaders from the House and Senate, to discuss a "remake" of The No Child Left Behind Act. Hunter's bill HR 1891 didn't pass, but 4 years later, on Dec 10, 2015, President Obama signed a new k-12 education law that The Washington Post described as "effectively ending heavy Federal involvement in public schools.
- Committee on Transportation and Infrastructure: As the Chairman's position on the Coast Guard subcommittee, Hunter worked with democrat John Garamendi, to shepherd three Coast Guard Authorization Acts (HR 2518, HR 4188, and HR 1987) through Congress. In 2015, their Coast Guard Authorization, H.R. 1987, which funded 43,000 personnel, spent $17.5 billion, and directed preliminary design work for a new Heavy Ice-Breaker, passed the House of Representatives unanimously. In 2016, Hunter, believing the two Heavy icebreakers owned by the Coast Guard to be inadequate for U.S. security interests, wrote a letter to Assistant Secretary of the Navy Sean Stackley, asking if the Navy had ice-breaking capability. Sec Stackley responded that no Navy warships had heavy ice-breaking capability. Hunter, then, called for building 2 new heavy icebreakers in the Coast Guard to augment the two 40-year-old ships.

Caucus memberships

- Congressional Arts Caucus
- Congressional Western Caucus
- Republican Study Committee

=== Political positions ===
Following in the footsteps of his father, Hunter's voting record was conservative; he has a lifetime rating of 93 from the American Conservative Union. He was a member of the Republican Study Committee, a caucus of House conservatives of which his father was a longtime member.

Economy

Hunter voted in favor of the Tax Cuts and Jobs Act of 2017. Hunter said that the plan was "good for most states" but "not as good" for California.

Healthcare

Hunter favors repealing the Affordable Care Act, and voted in support of a budget resolution to repeal it in January 2017. He expressed support for all drafts of the American Health Care Act of 2017 (AHCA), which would partially repeal and replace Obamacare, and voted for the AHCA on May 4, 2017. About the AHCA he said, "this is going to save America."

Hunter opposed the Health Care and Education Reconciliation Act of 2010, saying that it would "take away" the doctor-patient relationship and the right for people to choose "what type of operations they have", and that it would allow a "government bureaucrat" to make health care decisions for people. In an interview, Hunter said, "Things that you have problems with now would be exacerbated if you had government-run healthcare."

Environment

On environmental issues, Hunter has a 2% (out of 100%) lifetime voting score from the League of Conservation Voters, an environmental group.

Hunter rejects the scientific consensus on climate change. He believes that it is not caused by humans, that it may actually be positive, and that its cause is unknown.

Hunter does not believe the EPA should be allowed to regulate greenhouse gas emissions, and has consistently voted against any governmental limits to CO_{2} pollution. He would like to open up oil drilling in the United States in order to bring down gas prices.

In a 2009 interview with KPBS, Hunter expressed support for "overriding" the designation of the delta smelt as an endangered species, saying that overriding it would reduce unemployment in California.

War and military affairs

In a 2011 op-ed in Politico, Hunter opposed a complete withdrawal of American forces from Afghanistan, because of "unreliable Afghan leadership"; he accused the Obama administration of "echoing a misshapen worldview that puts American interests last". In October 2012, Hunter returned from a visit to Afghanistan, as part of a congressional delegation, with a more upbeat assessment, stating "Frankly I was very skeptical last year when I went last, and have been, on whether [the Afghans] can do this, but they are."

In December 2013, Hunter said that the culture of Middle Easterners made them unreliable negotiating partners.

In 2013, Hunter called for the United States to train and arm Syrian rebels and said that President Obama would be breaking the law if he bombed Syria without a Congressional mandate, and that bombing should be considered an impeachable offense. In September 2014, however, Hunter voted against a proposal to train and arm Syrian rebels fighting against ISIL extremists, saying that the proposal failed to go far enough.

Columnist Dan Murtaugh of the Press-Register suggested that Hunter's 2011 call to rebid the littoral combat ship program was an attempt to get federal funds for a shipyard in his district. Hunter turned again to the LCS program in 2012, with a call to reduce LCS builds in favor of amphibious ships, because he had read a report that the Marines had leased a ferry with similar characteristics to the LCS and the Joint High-Speed Vessel (JHSV). In 2013 Hunter said the United States Navy was overworked and spread thin, and said that a "306-ship target might represent the absolute minimum capacity the navy needs".

He called for the system of awarding the Medal of Honor to be reevaluated, due to the cases of Sergeant Rafael Peralta and Captain William D. Swenson. After Secretary of Defense Chuck Hagel became the third Secretary to deny the award to Peralta, Hunter maintained his pressure on the Pentagon. In late March 2014, he sent a letter asking the Pentagon to reevaluate Peralta's case, as well as the case of Bradley Kasal, who used his body to shield a fellow Marine from a grenade blast in Iraq in 2004.

In 2015, Hunter intervened in the case of SFC Charles Martland, a Green Beret facing discharge for confronting an Afghan official accused of raping a 12-year-old boy. While stationed in Kunduz Province, Afghanistan, Martland and his commander, Captain Dan Quinn, were approached by the boy's mother, who reported that a local Afghan police officer had imprisoned and raped her son. After a medic confirmed signs of sexual assault, Martland and Quinn confronted the officer. The officer filed a complaint, and both soldiers were removed from the base. Quinn resigned from the Army, and Martland was placed on a discharge list. Martland sought help from Hunter, who wrote to Defense Secretary Ash Carter in August 2015, objecting to the discharge. Hunter told Fox News, "It's sad to think that a child rapist is put above one of our own elite military operators. Sgt. Martland was left with no other choice but to intervene in a bad situation." He added, "The Army should not side with a corrupt Afghan police officer." Initially, the Army defended its decision. On April 29, 2016, Martland announced the Army had reversed its decision and allowed him to remain in service. He told Fox News, "I am really thankful for being able to continue to serve. I appreciate everything Congressman Duncan Hunter and his chief of staff, Joe Kasper, did for me.

In 2017, Hunter continued his effort to have Peralta's Navy Cross elevated. In 2018, Hunter requested a review of the awarding of the Silver Star to Marine 1st Lieutenant Travis Manion, who was originally recommended for the Navy Cross.

Hunter has been supportive of certain service members who have been accused or convicted of criminal actions. Hunter has been a strong supporter of Major Mathew Golsteyn, a former Green Beret charged with murder. Hunter drafted a letter to Trump, asking him to give his personal attention to Golsteyn's case. The congressman along with other lawmakers sought presidential help in the case of Chief Special Warfare Operator Eddie Gallagher who was to stand trial in a San Diego military court for similar offenses. Hunter wrote letters to both Obama and Trump, asking them to consider giving a presidential pardon or leniency to Lieutenant Clint Lorance, a platoon commander in Afghanistan, who was convicted of second degree murder for ordering his troops during a combat mission to fire on Afghans approaching on a motorcycle at high speed who turned out to be unarmed; Trump reviewed the case and pardoned Lorance. Hunter worked with Lieutenant Colonel Jason Amerine, who testified to Congress criticizing the Pentagon for failing to mount missions to rescue Taliban hostages; Following his testimony the Federal Bureau of Investigation opened an inquiry into whether Amerine had divulged classified information to Hunter, Amerine later testified to a Congressional committee looking into whether the military retaliates against whistle blowers. In May 2019, during an attempt to defend Gallagher at a town hall meeting, Hunter claimed that he too had posed for photos with a dead enemy combatant while deployed, and called the military justice system "corrupt". In an interview, Hunter claimed the fire aimed at terrorist positions in the city had probably killed hundreds of civilians Hunter appeared in federal court in San Diego on November 25, 2019, for a hearing in his own case, and supported Trump's downward sentence modification for Gallagher. Hunter's hearing was postponed until December 3, 2019.

Women

He voted against the Lilly Ledbetter Fair Pay Act of 2009, an act which made it easier to file lawsuits regarding wage discrimination.

In February 2013, Hunter voted in favor of renewing the Violence Against Women Act.

Hunter opposes women in combat and, to make a rhetorical point, in 2016 he introduced an amendment to the Defense Authorization Act to require 18-to-26-year-old women to register for the Selective Service System (as 18-to-26-year-old men are required to do). This backfired, however, as the House Armed Services Committee voted 32–30 to adopt the amendment.

LGBT rights

He supported the Defense of Marriage Act (DOMA), which restricted federal recognition of marriage to opposite-sex couples only, and cut off federal benefits to same-sex couples. He voted to delay the repeal of Don't Ask, Don't Tell, which barred gays and lesbians from serving openly in the United States military. In 2011, Hunter advocated delaying the implementation of the Don't Ask, Don't Tell Repeal Act of 2010, which was signed into law by President Barack Obama. In 2011, Hunter introduced legislation to require that all "four military service chiefs certify that the repeal of Don't Ask Don't Tell won't negatively affect their combat units".

On the question of transgender military personnel, Hunter said that as a Marine Corps veteran, he could not imagine sharing a shower with "somebody who was a girl and didn't have the surgery to become a man but kept the girl stuff".

Abortion

Hunter is anti-abortion and believes life begins at conception. He consistently voted against all forms of abortion, as well as cloning and embryonic stem cell research. In 2017 he introduced a bill to give unborn babies 14th Amendment protections. Hunter voted to ban the morning after pill in the case of rape or incest, and would like to ban IUDs.

He has been rated 0% by the abortion rights group NARAL and 100% by the anti-abortion National Right to Life Committee.

Immigration

At an April 2010 Tea Party movement rally in Ramona, California, Hunter advocated for the deportation of United States citizens who are the children of illegal immigrants. At the rally, Hunter said, "It's a complex issue and ... you could look and say, 'You're a mean guy. That's a mean thing to do. That's not a humanitarian thing to do' ... We simply cannot afford what we're doing right now. We just can't afford it. California's going under." He confirmed the comments to San Diego County's North County Times, telling the newspaper that he supported House Resolution 1868, a measure that called for the elimination of birthright citizenship in the United States. He expressed support for the 2010 Arizona immigration law, calling it a national security issue and "a fantastic starting point".

Press relations

After a reporter from The Guardian was assaulted by Republican Representative Greg Gianforte from Montana, Hunter's response was published in several newspapers. In response to questions about the AHCA's effect on those with pre-existing conditions, Gianforte put his hands around the reporter's neck and "body-slammed" him to the ground, injuring his elbow and breaking his glasses. Hunter commented: "It's not appropriate behavior. Unless the reporter deserved it."

Smoking

Hunter is an advocate of tobacco products. He uses an e-cigarette and opposes the banning of e-cigarettes on airplanes. Hunter puffed on his e-cigarette during a congressional hearing about vaping.

In July 2010, Hunter introduced legislation into the 111th Congress to allow tobacco products to be shipped to service members serving in Iraq and Afghanistan; the legislation died after being referred to committee. In 2014, Hunter moved to block a plan by the military to ban sales of tobacco products on bases and ships.

== Campaign finance investigation, indictment and conviction ==
In April 2016, Hunter came under scrutiny from the Federal Election Commission regarding his use of campaign funds for personal expenses from 2015 to 2016, after Citizens for Responsibility and Ethics in Washington filed an ethics complaint.

In August 2016, the Office of Congressional Ethics made a recommendation to the Ethics Committee for a full investigation. Hunter and his wife, Margaret, who was being paid $3,000 monthly from campaign funds in her role as campaign manager, shared a campaign fund credit card which had charges that were questioned. The expenses included $1,302 in charges for video games, $600 to pay for a family rabbit to travel by plane, clothing from Abercrombie & Fitch, a donation to their son's school, payments to an oral and maxillofacial surgeon, travel costs (including 32 payments for airfare, hotel stays in Arizona and Italy), groceries, a nail salon visit, tuition, non-specified items at a surf shop, and outdoor equipment.

After FEC, House Ethics, and press questions about his campaign expenditures, Hunter ordered an independent audit of his campaign. He gave it to the FEC for publication and paid his campaign back 48,650 dollars before the election on November 6, 2016.

=== Federal investigation ===
In February 2017, Four months after Hunter made the reimbursement to his campaign, the newly appointed acting U.S. Attorney for San Diego, Alana Robinson, launched a criminal investigation of Hunter, including FBI raids on his house and the campaign consultant's office. She was later challenged, unsuccessfully due to her earlier attendance (2015) at a Hillary Clinton fundraiser.

In March 2017, the House Ethics Committee revealed that Hunter was under a Department of Justice criminal investigation for campaign finance violations and that it was deferring its own investigation as a result. The Office of Congressional Ethics report stated: "Rep. Hunter may have converted tens of thousands of dollars of campaign funds from his congressional campaign committee to personal use to pay for family travel, flights, utilities, health care, school uniforms, and tuition, jewelry, groceries, and other goods, services, and expenses." Hunter said that he repaid the money to the campaign, and denied wrongdoing. He also announced that his wife would no longer receive a $3,000 per month salary for consulting with the campaign. His lawyers Gregory Vega and Elliot Berkewas said that any improper use of campaign funds was "inadvertent and unintentional". In March 2017, in a statement issued through his lawyers, Hunter said that he had repaid his campaign approximately $60,000 in 2016. In April 2017, Hunter returned from international travel in order to address issues around his campaign funds, promising to correct any inappropriate or mistaken charges.

=== Indictment ===
On August 21, 2018, seventy-seven days before the congressional election, and twenty-two months after Hunter had re-imbursed his campaign 48,650 dollars, pursuant to his self-ordered audit, A federal grand jury in San Diego indicted Hunter and his wife on 60 criminal counts centered on campaign mis-spending. The indictment would be criticized later by Former Federal Election Commission Chairman, Bradley E. Smith in a letter to the president, called "Pivotal" to Hunter's Pardon. Former FEC Chairman Smith told President Trump, "The U.S. Attorney's decision to prosecute Congressman Hunter is outside the norm of campaign finance law; it contradicts the broad intent of FECA; and it raises the specter of political prosecution that the act was designed to avoid. Smith pointed to the Indictment's charging Hunter with a criminal act for running in the Marine Corps Marathon at campaign expense. Smith said, "Turning to Congressman Hunter's case, the DOJ indictment listed as Allegations a number of claims, that it would appear to me would clearly be permissible under FEC regulations and past rulings.

Indictment in United States v. Duncan D. Hunter and Margaret E. Hunter

The San Diego U.S. Attorney's Office accused the couple of conspiring to misuse $250,000 in campaign funds for personal expenses, as well as filing false campaign finance reports. Personal expenses charged to the campaign included vacations in Italy and Hawaii, theater tickets, and purchases in the gaming platform Steam. The indictment says that when Hunter wanted to buy some shorts for himself, his wife suggested that he falsely report the purchase as "golf balls for wounded warriors". On another occasion, he tried unsuccessfully to arrange a tour of a Navy base as a cover for a family vacation trip to Italy. When the Navy couldn't arrange something on the date Hunter wanted, Hunter told his chief of staff to "tell the Navy to go fuck themselves."

Former FEC Chairman Bradley Smith continued to describe the Indictment, "For example, over 40 of the alleged 'overt acts', occurring over a six-year period, involved using campaign funds to pay for meals or rounds of golf with proven campaign contributors. As a general rule, it is not a violation of FECA or FEC regulations to pay for meals or entertainment with campaign contributors.

With respect to the 250,000 dollars alleged in the indictment as "illegal expenditures", Smith said, in his letter to the President, "In Congressman Hunter's case, the total of alleged personal use expenses falling within the statute of limitations at the time of the indictment—-assuming that all could be proven as illegal personal use—-amounted to approximately $80,730. By the indictment's own admission, after internal campaign audits raised questions about whether some expenses qualified as campaign expenses, Hunter had already re-imbursed the campaign $67,000. Following the example of the recent Stearns case, one would have expected a civil enforcement action, in which additional reimbursements might have been ordered, a civil fine levied, and the campaign ordered to amend its reports to show these new or re-classified transactions.

Former FEC Chairman Smith's letter to President Trump was written on November 7, 2020. On December 22, 2020, and December 23, respectively, President Trump issued full Pardons to Hunter and his wife, Margaret. On the same days, the White House stated that Former FEC Chairman Smith supported the pardons.

Two years later, the FEC, consisting of an equal number of Democrats and Republicans, entered into a Conciliation Agreement with the Hunters, agreeing to a $12,000 civil fine, without admission of liability, and for purposes of settlement only.

The indictment also alleges that Hunter spent campaign money on "personal relationships" with five women in Washington, DC, listed as Individuals 14, 15, 16, 17, and 18 in the indictment. The women were said to have included lobbyists and one of his own congressional staffers. "Throughout the relevant period, the Hunters spent substantially more than they earned," according to the indictment. "They overdrew their bank account more than 1,100 times in a seven-year period, resulting in approximately $37,761 in 'overdraft' and 'insufficient funds' bank fees."

Speaker of the House Paul Ryan (R) called the charges against Hunter "deeply serious" and indicated that he would be stripped of his committee assignments pending a resolution of those charges. At first, Hunter refused to leave his committees voluntarily; however, following reports that the Republican Steering Committee was planning to forcibly remove his committee assignments, Hunter reversed course and agreed to step down from his committees. The San Diego Union-Tribune, Hunter's hometown paper, published an editorial calling for him to resign from Congress. Hunter's father, the former congressman, attacked the indictment as a "late hit" and claimed it was politically motivated. Hunter himself insisted that he never used campaign funds for personal expenses and that the indictment was a "witch hunt" carried out by "partisan Democrat prosecutors" and the "deep state". The Union-Tribune pointed out that the local U.S. Attorney's office is led by Adam L. Braverman, a Trump administration appointee. However, on August 25, 2018, the Union Tribune reported that the U.S. Secret Service had acknowledged that two of Hunter's prosecutors had previously attended Hillary Clinton's fund raiser before initiating the Hunter investigation and prosecution." In an article entitled: "Secret Service Explains why Prosecutors were invited to Clinton Fund-raiser", the Secret Service claimed the two prosecutors, both Democrats, were needed at Clinton's fund-raiser for "prosecutorial guidance".

=== Guilty plea and sentence ===
On August 23, 2018, both Hunter and his wife pleaded not guilty to all charges. The two entered and left the courtroom separately, and were represented by separate counsel. Hunter suggested his wife was to blame for any irregularities, saying that she handled all their personal and campaign finances and adding, "I didn't do it. I didn't spend any money illegally."

On June 24, 2019, federal prosecutors submitted a court filing alleging that Hunter used his campaign funds for extramarital affairs with five women, including three lobbyists, a congressional aide, and one of his staffers between 2009 and 2016. Ahead of a court hearing in November 2019, Hunter expressed support for President Donald Trump's downward sentence modification for convicted war criminal Eddie Gallagher, but refused to answer reporters' questions about his case.

In exchange for prosecutors dismissing 59 counts, on December 3, 2019, Hunter pleaded guilty to one count of misusing campaign funds. Hunter said he expected to be sentenced to prison time, but hoped the judge would not sentence his wife to incarceration. On March 17, 2020, U.S. District Judge Thomas J. Whelan sentenced Hunter to eleven months in prison, followed by three months of supervised release. Whelan rejected Hunter's request to serve most or all of his sentence on home confinement, given the long duration of his criminal conduct and the amount of money misappropriated. Hunter was supposed to begin an 11-month prison sentence in January 2021; however, on Dec 22 and Dec 23, 2020, President Trump, following his receipt of former FEC Chairman Bradley Smith's letter stating that the Hunter prosecution "raised the specter of political prosecution", gave full pardons to both Hunters. The FEC followed with a $12,000 civil fine without a finding of liability.

Hunter, having resigned from Congress on January 13, 2020, endorsed, with his father, their former colleague, Darrell Issa for the Congressional seat. Republican Issa won against a second challenge by Campa-Najjar.

Margaret Hunter pleaded guilty to one count of corruption on June 13, 2019. She acknowledged that she had conspired with her husband to spend more than $200,000 in campaign funds on personal expenses. She agreed to give testimony and cooperate with the prosecution. Her plea agreement could have sent her to prison for up to five years. After a postponement due to the COVID-19 pandemic, she was sentenced to eight months home confinement and three years probation in August 2020.

Duncan Hunter was scheduled to begin his prison sentence on January 4, 2021. However, he did not serve his sentence, because both he and Margaret were pardoned by then-president Donald Trump in December 2020.

=== Resignation from Congress ===
On December 5, 2019, the House Ethics Committee informed Hunter that he had violated House rules when he cast votes in the chamber two days earlier. They said he must refrain from Congressional voting because he had pleaded guilty to a federal felony with a potentially significant prison sentence. Longstanding precedent holds that House members convicted of felonies should not take part in floor votes or committee work until the Ethics Committee reviews the matter. Although there is no constitutional rule barring a convicted felon from voting, the convicted member's party leadership usually strongly discourages a member from doing so, and the Ethics Committee has indicated in the past that convicted felons can be disciplined if they do take part in committee or floor votes.

On December 6, 2019, Hunter announced that he would resign from Congress after the holidays. By waiting until January to resign, Hunter would receive at least an additional $10,000 in monthly salary. On January 7, 2020, he submitted his letters of resignation, effective January 13, to House Speaker Nancy Pelosi and California Governor Gavin Newsom.

In January 2020, Democratic Representatives Josh Harder (California) and Max Rose (New York) introduced the No Pensions for Corrupt Politicians Act of 2020, which would prevent Hunter and other members of Congress who commit or conspire to commit campaign finance crimes from collecting a congressional pension. It is estimated that otherwise Hunter would have received an annual payment of at least $32,000 in a congressional pension, which he would have been able to begin accessing when he turned 62.

The following month, in February 2020, Barron's published an investigative report, based on leaks of confidential documents, that implicated Hunter as a key figure in the prosecution of Greek Orthodox priest and hedge fund manager Emmanuel Lemelson. The outlet noted Hunter's involvement in SEC vs. Lemelson as "a glimpse of how companies try to get regulators to go after their short-selling enemies." U.S. Magistrate Judge Donald Cabell noted that the SEC had been urged to investigate Lemelson in a letter from Hunter, stating the court found enough facts to warrant discovery on Lemelson's claim of selective enforcement and bias.

Newsom's office stated that there would be no special election to fill Hunter's congressional seat, and so it remained vacant until it was filled in the November 2020 election.

=== Presidential pardon ===
December 2020 pardon granted by Donald Trump

Hunter was scheduled to report to the federal prison in La Tuna, Texas, in January 2021. However, on December 22, 2020, President Donald Trump pardoned Hunter, as well as Chris Collins of New York, another Republican congressman convicted of corruption, and commuted the sentence of Steve Stockman of Texas. The following day, Trump pardoned Hunter's estranged wife Margaret. In 2022, the fines for both were upheld, however, since the Federal Election Commission determined that the pardon did not cover the civil liability.

== Federal Election Commission Conciliation with Hunters ==
On February 23, 2022, the Federal Election Commission, comprised equally of Republicans and Democrats, entered into a Conciliation Agreement with the Hunters (respondents), reflecting the FEC's view on the 6 years of campaign spending issues.

The FEC conciliation agreement stated: "Respondents have provided detailed explanations that many of the alleged personal disbursements in question were for dinners and other events that involved documented contributors to Duncan D. Hunter's campaign, indicating they were valid campaign expenses, but admit that in some instances, records that would clearly establish the campaign purpose for the expenditures are either absent or inadequate. Solely for settling this matter only and without admitting liability in this matter or with respect to any other proceeding, respondents agree not to contest the Commission's findings. Respondents will pay a civil penalty to the Commission of 12,000 dollars."

== Personal life ==
In 1998 Hunter married Polish-born Margaret Elizabeth Jankowski, whom he had met in 1992. They have three children. In 2016, Hunter sold his home in Alpine, California, and used part of the proceeds to repay his political campaign for some of the money he had spent on personal expenses. He and his family moved in with his father, Duncan L. Hunter. Margaret filed for divorce from Hunter in November 2020. Their divorce was finalized on January 31, 2023, and she resumed using her maiden name, Jankowski.

U.S. House of Representatives
Preceded by Duncan Hunter	Member of the U.S. House of Representatives from California's 52nd congressional district 2009–2013	Succeeded by Scott Peters
Preceded by Brian Bilbray	Member of the U.S. House of Representatives from California's 50th congressional district 2013–2020	Succeeded by Darrell Issa
U.S. order of precedence (ceremonial)
Preceded by John Campbell as Former U.S. Representative	Order of precedence of the United States as Former U.S. Representative	Succeeded by Karen Bass as Former U.S. Representative
