= United American Patriots =

American nonprofit organization

United American Patriots (UAP)
- Formation: 2005
- Founder: Herbert Donahue
- CEO: David Gurfein
- Website: uap.org

United American Patriots (UAP) is an American nonprofit organization which advocates and funds legal defense for American servicemembers they believe to have been unjustly convicted and imprisoned on war crimes charges. Herbert Donahue, a retired U.S. Marine Corps major who served in the Vietnam War, founded the group in 2005. Retired Marine Lt. Col. David "Bull" Gurfein is CEO. They have advocated on behalf of such American service members as Robert Bales, Corey Clagett, Derrick Miller, Clint Lorance, and Eddie Gallagher.

In 2016, The New York Times reported on UAP's collaboration the Combat Clemency Project, a student group at the University of Chicago Law School.

== Activities ==
During the 2019 case against Marine Gunnery Sgts Joshua Negron and Daniel Draher, the UAP raised money, lobbied Congress on their behalf and conducted public advocacy.

The UAP efforts supported the pardons and clemency in 2020 of former Army Sgt. Micheal Williams, former Army 1st Sgt. John Hatley and former Army Staff Stg. Calvin Gibbs. Williams had been paroled in 2014 after serving 11 years of his 25 year sentence, Hatley also served 11 years and was paroled in October 2020, Gibbs at the time was still serving a life sentence.

In 2024, UAP provided support to 15 Army, 7 Marines and 2 Navy personnel including Army Staff Sgt. Robert Bales and paroled Army First Sgt. John Hatley

In June 2026, at a White House presentation, retired Marine Maj. James Capers Jr. was presented the Medal of Honor by President Donald Trump.
