= David Gurfein =

American military veteran

- Education: Syracuse University (BA); Harvard University (MBA)
- Military career
- Allegiance: United States
- Branch: United States Marine Corps
- Rank: Lieutenant Colonel
- Nickname: "Bull"

David Gurfein is an American military veteran. He retired as a U.S. Marine Corps lieutenant colonel. Gurfein is currently the CEO of the American nonprofit organization United American Patriots (UAP).

== Early life ==
Gurfein attended Great Neck South High School in Long Island, New York. He was the school's quarterback from 1980–1982. He proposed and led a successful campaign to change the school's mascot from a Confederate rebel to an American Revolutionary War rebel during the 1981–82 school year after the lynching of Michael Donald in Mobile, Alabama.

== Military career ==
Gurfein joined the U.S. Marines at the age of 17. Through the Marines' Delayed Entry Program, he attended Syracuse University and graduated with a bachelor's degree in communications and political science. After fighting in the Gulf War, he left active-duty in the military to get an MBA from Harvard University but he remained in the reserves. After the September 11 attacks, Gurfein was sent to Afghanistan, where he was awarded the Bronze Star. At the end of that tour of duty, he re-enlisted and was deployed to Kuwait. He was part of the I Marine Expeditionary Force, which led the assault into southern Iraq at the start of the Iraq War.

On March 21, 2003, Major Gurfein was photographed pulling down a poster of Iraqi President Saddam Hussein in Safwan, Iraq. The photo, which was taken by American war photographer Chris Hondros, is considered one of the iconic images of the war. Gurfein said the marines removed portraits of Saddam in Safwan because, "We wanted to send a message that Saddam is done... People are scared to show a lot of emotion. That's why we wanted to show them this time we're here, and Saddam is done."

After 25 years of service, Gurfein retired from the military in 2007.

== Post-military career ==
In 2016, Gurfein ran as the Republican candidate for New York's 4th congressional district against Democratic incumbent Kathleen Rice. Rice won the election 59.6–40.4%.

Gurfein is currently the CEO of the American nonprofit organization United American Patriots (UAP).
