= Wilding v. DNC Services Corp. =

2016 class-action lawsuit

Wilding et al. v. DNC Services Corporation, et al., was a class action lawsuit filed in 2016 against the Democratic National Committee and Debbie Wasserman-Schultz. The plaintiffs, a group of Bernie Sanders supporters, claimed they have been defrauded in the 2016 Democratic presidential primaries.

Their suit was dismissed by Judge William Zloch of the U.S. District Court for the Southern District of Florida for lack of standing. The judge found that none of the plaintiffs had claimed to have donated to the DNC on the basis of promises contained in the DNC charter, and therefore the plaintiffs could not claim to have incurred damages. The court held that "To the extent Plaintiffs wish to air their general grievances with the DNC or its candidate selection process, their redress is through the ballot box, the DNC’s internal workings, or their right of free speech — not through the judiciary."

In 2019, the U.S. Court of Appeals for the Eleventh Circuit, in a unanimous panel decision, held that the plaintiffs' complaint failed on a "number of jurisdictional and substantive grounds" and affirmed the dismissal. The court held that the plaintiffs' claims of fraud, negligent misrepresentation, consumer law violations, and unjust enrichment failed on the merits and directed those claims to be dismissed with prejudice. The court held that plaintiffs' claims of negligence and breach of fiduciary duty failed for lack of standing, and directed those claims to be dismissed without prejudice.
