= Judge Boynton =

Judge Boynton may refer to:

- Charles Albert Boynton (1867–1954), judge of the United States District Court for the Western District of Texas
- Thomas Jefferson Boynton (1838–1871), judge of the United States District Court for the Southern District of Florida
