= Judge McKinney =

Judge McKinney may refer to:

- John McKinney (Florida judge) (1829–1871), judge of the United States District Court for the Southern District of Florida
- Larry J. McKinney (1944–2017), judge of the United States District Court for the Southern District of Indiana
