= James W. Kehoe =

American judge

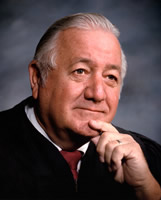

Senior Judge of the United States District Court for the Southern District of Florida
- In office October 16, 1992 – December 13, 1998

Judge of the United States District Court for the Southern District of Florida
- In office October 5, 1979 – October 16, 1992
- Appointed by: Jimmy Carter
- Preceded by: Seat established by 92 Stat. 1629
- Succeeded by: Donald M. Middlebrooks

Personal details
- Born: James W. Kehoe; September 27, 1925 Portsmouth, Virginia
- Died: December 13, 1998 (aged 73) Miami, Florida
- Education: University of Florida (AA); Fredric G. Levin College of Law (LLB)

James W. Kehoe (September 27, 1925 – December 13, 1998) was a United States district judge of the United States District Court for the Southern District of Florida.

== Education and career ==
Born in Portsmouth, Virginia, Kehoe received an Associate of Arts degree from the University of Florida in 1947. He received a Bachelor of Laws from the Fredric G. Levin College of Law at the University of Florida in 1950. He was in the United States Army Air Corps as a Sergeant from 1943 to 1946. He was in private practice of law in Miami, Florida from 1950 to 1955. He was an assistant county solicitor for Dade County (now Miami-Dade County), Florida from 1955 to 1957. He was in private practice of law in Miami from 1957 to 1961. He was a judge on the Civil Court of Record of Florida from 1961 to 1963. He was a judge of the Circuit Court for the 11th Judicial Circuit of the State of Florida from 1963 to 1977, Chief judge of the 11th Circuit in 1977, and a judge of the Third District Court of Appeals for the State of Florida from 1977 to 1979.

== Federal judicial service ==
Kehoe was nominated by President Jimmy Carter on July 18, 1979, to the United States District Court for the Southern District of Florida, to a new seat created by 92 Stat. 1629. He was confirmed by the United States Senate on October 4, 1979, and received his commission on October 5, 1979. He assumed senior status on October 16, 1992. His service was terminated on December 13, 1998, due to his death in Miami.

== Sources ==
Legal offices
Preceded by Seat established by 92 Stat. 1629	Judge of the United States District Court for the Southern District of Florida; 1979–1992	Succeeded by Donald M. Middlebrooks
