= List of federal judges appointed by James K. Polk =

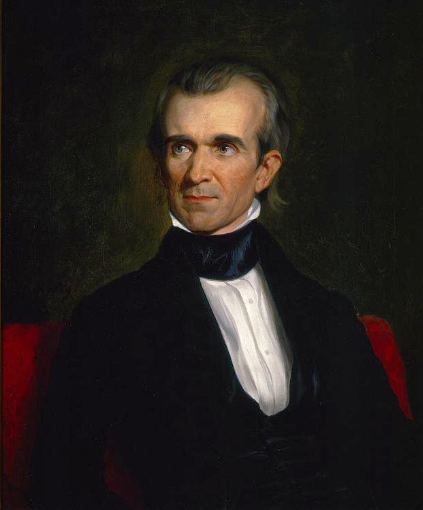
James K. Polk

Following is a list of all Article III United States federal judges appointed by President James K. Polk during his presidency. In total Polk appointed 10 Article III federal judges, including 2 Justices to the Supreme Court of the United States, 1 judge to the United States Circuit Court of the District of Columbia, and 7 judges to the United States district courts.

Polk faced some obstacles in seating Justices on the Supreme Court. After Henry Baldwin's death in April 1844, Polk nominated James Buchanan for the seat, but Buchanan declined the nomination. Polk then nominated George Washington Woodward of Pennsylvania to Baldwin's seat, but the nomination was rejected by the United States Senate by a vote of 20–29. Polk finally succeeded with the nomination of Robert Cooper Grier, filling the vacancy after two years.

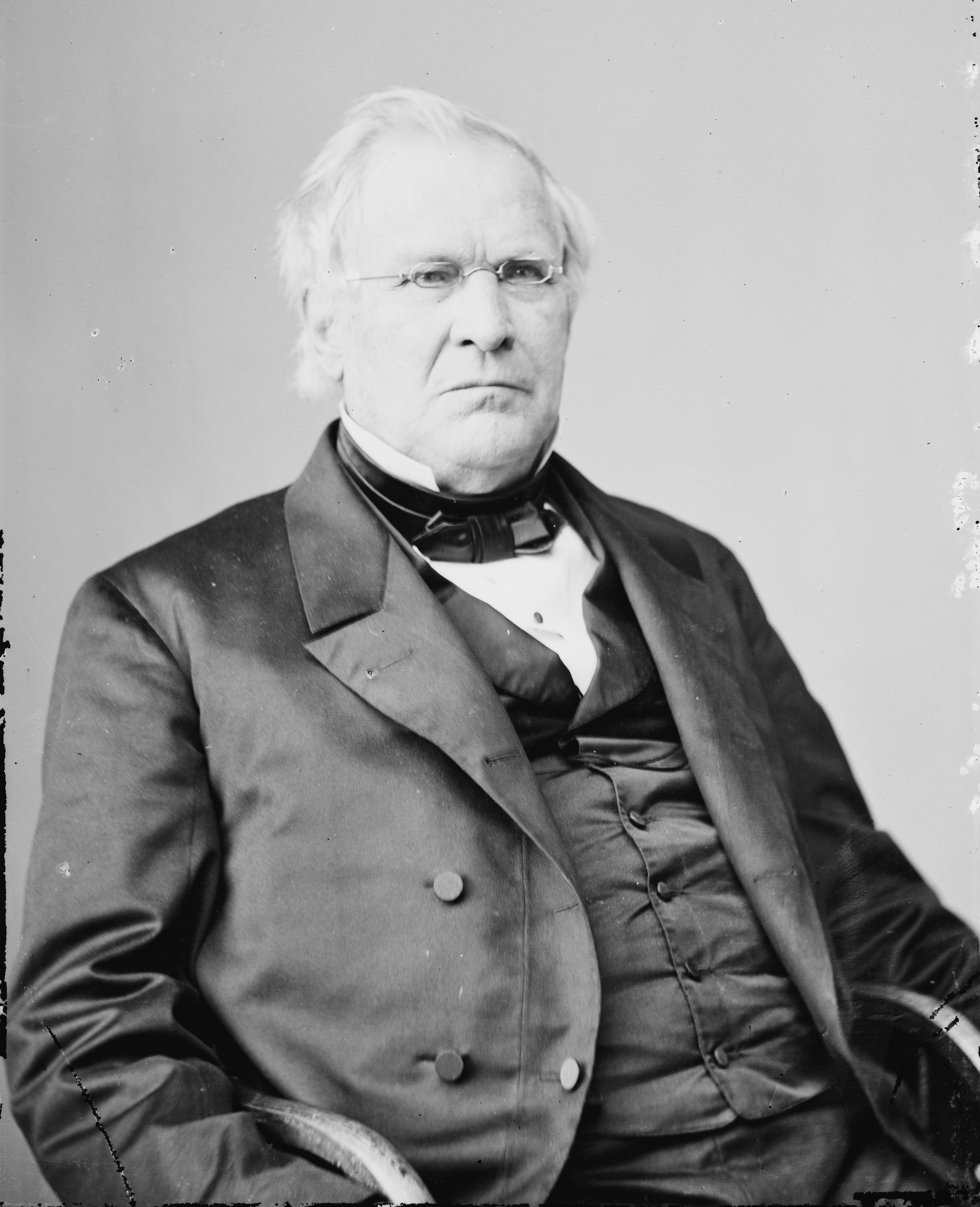
Robert Cooper Grier, one of President Polk's two appointees to the Supreme Court.

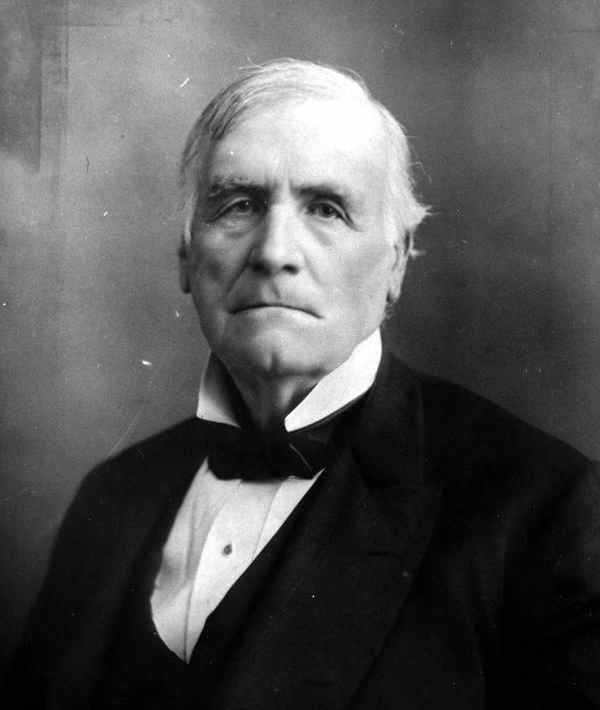
Polk appointed William Marvin as the first judge for the United States District Court for the Southern District of Florida.

== United States Supreme Court justices ==
#	Justice	Seat	State	Former justice	Nomination date	Confirmation date	Began active service	Ended active service
1	Levi Woodbury	2	New Hampshire	Joseph Story	December 23, 1845	January 3, 1846	September 20, 1845	September 4, 1851
2	Robert Cooper Grier	3	Pennsylvania	Henry Baldwin	August 3, 1846	August 4, 1846	August 4, 1846	January 31, 1870

== Circuit courts ==
#	Judge	Circuit	Nomination date	Confirmation date	Began active service	Ended active service
1	James Dunlop	D.C.	December 23, 1845	February 3, 1846	October 3, 1845	November 27, 1855

== District courts ==
#	Judge	Court (Note: See List of United States district and territorial courts)	Nomination date	Confirmation date	Began active service	Ended active service
1	John White Brockenbrough	W.D. Va.	December 23, 1845	January 14, 1846	January 14, 1846	May 4, 1861
2	John Charles Watrous	D. Tex./E.D. Tex.	May 27, 1846	May 29, 1846	May 29, 1846	April 19, 1870
3	John K. Kane	E.D. Pa.	June 11, 1846	June 17, 1846	June 17, 1846	February 21, 1858
4	Isaac H. Bronson	D. Fla./N.D. Fla.	May 5, 1846	August 8, 1846	August 8, 1846	August 13, 1855
5	John James Dyer	D. Iowa	February 8, 1847	March 3, 1847	March 3, 1847	September 14, 1855
6	William Marvin	S.D. Fla.	March 2, 1847	March 3, 1847	March 3, 1847	July 1, 1863
7	Andrew G. Miller	D. Wis./E.D. Wis.	June 12, 1848	June 12, 1848	June 12, 1848	January 1, 1873

== Sources ==
- Federal Judicial Center
