= Ed Artau =

American judge (born 1964)

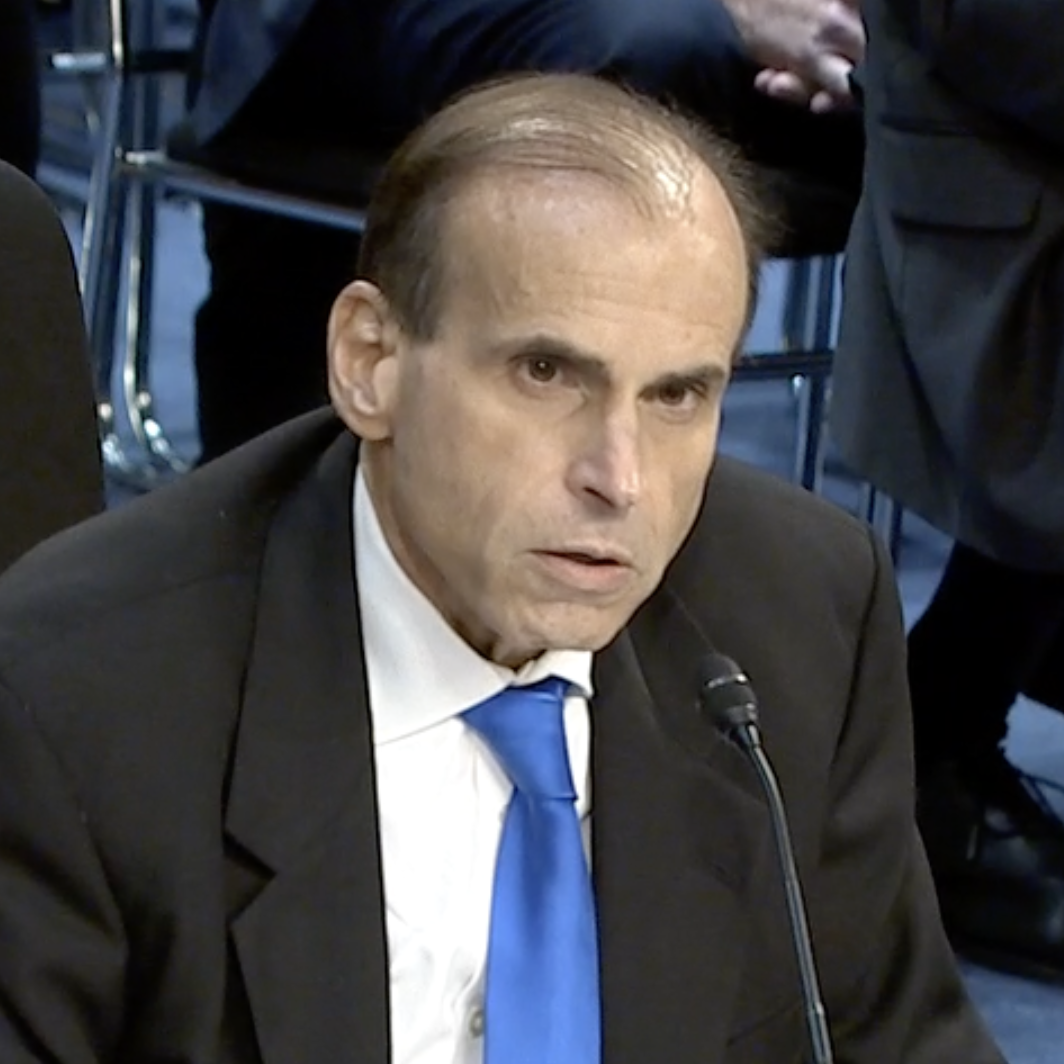

Judge of the United States District Court for the Southern District of Florida
- Incumbent
- Assumed office September 9, 2025
- Appointed by: Donald Trump
- Preceded by: Robert N. Scola Jr.

Judge of the Florida Fourth District Court of Appeal
- In office June 30, 2020 – September 9, 2025

Personal details
- Born: Edward L Artau; 1964 (age 61–62) Yonkers, New York, U.S.
- Education: Nova Southeastern University (BS); Georgetown University (JD)

Edward L Artau (born 1964) is an American lawyer who serves as a United States district judge of the United States District Court for the Southern District of Florida. He served as a judge of the Florida Fourth District Court of Appeal from 2020 to 2025 and is also a former judge of the Florida Circuit Court.

== Early life and education ==
Artau is the son of Cuban Americans whose family fled from Cuba to the United States to escape the regime of Fidel Castro. Artau was born in 1964, in Yonkers, New York. He received his Bachelor of Science degree from Nova Southeastern University in 1985 and his Juris Doctor from Georgetown University Law Center in 1988. After graduation, Artau became an associate at Hodgson Russ in Palm Beach. In 1993, became a senior associate at Proskaur Rose, LLP, in Boca Raton. In 1996, he established his own law firm. From 2004 to 2014, Artau served as the general counsel for the South Florida Water Management District.

== Career ==
Artau served as a judge of the Florida 15th Circuit Court in Palm Beach County from 2014 to 2020. Artau then served as a judge of the Florida Fourth District Court of Appeal from 2020 to 2025.

Artau is a member of the Federalist Society.

=== Federal judicial service ===
On May 28, 2025, President Donald Trump announced his intention to nominate Artau to a seat vacated by Robert N. Scola Jr. of the United States District Court for the Southern District of Florida. On June 16, 2025, his nomination was sent to the Senate. His nomination was reported from the Senate Judiciary Committee on July 17, 2025. On September 4, cloture was invoked on his nomination by a 53–46 vote. On September 8, his nomination was confirmed by a 50–43 vote. He received his judicial commission on September 9, 2025.

Legal offices
Preceded by Robert N. Scola Jr.	Judge of the United States District Court for the Southern District of Florida; 2025–present	Incumbent
