= William Marvin =

American judge and politician (1808–1902)

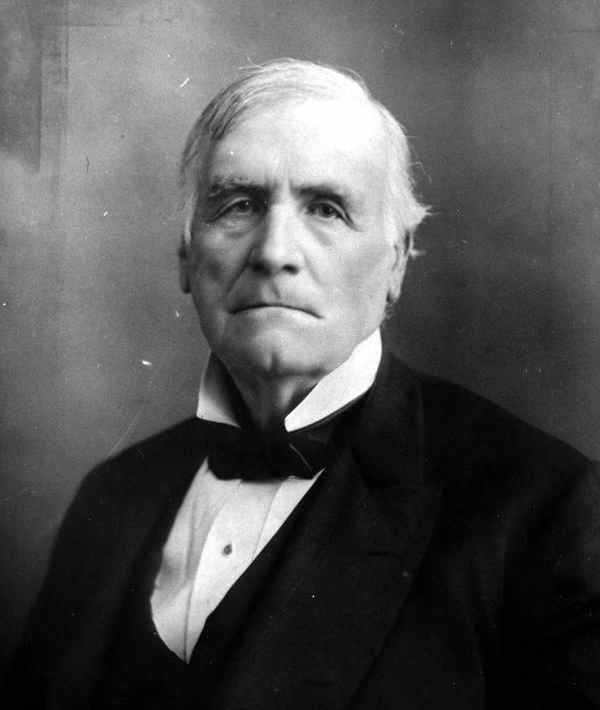

7th Governor of Florida
- In office July 13, 1865 – December 20, 1865
- Appointed by: Andrew Johnson
- Preceded by: Abraham K. Allison
- Succeeded by: David S. Walker

Judge of the United States District Court for the Southern District of Florida
- In office March 3, 1847 – July 1, 1863
- Appointed by: James K. Polk
- Preceded by: Seat established by 9 Stat. 131
- Succeeded by: Thomas Jefferson Boynton

Personal details
- Born: William Marvin; April 14, 1808 Fairfield, New York, US
- Died: July 9, 1902 (aged 94) Skaneateles, New York, US
- Resting place: Lake View Cemetery, Skaneateles, New York
- Party: Democratic
- Spouse(s): Harriet Newell Foote (m. 1846-1848, her death); Eliza P. Riddle Jewett (m. 1867-1901, her death)
- Relations: Richard P. Marvin (brother); Elisha Foote (father in law)
- Children: 1
- Relatives: Richard P. Marvin
- Education: Homer Academy, Homer, New York
- Profession: Attorney

William Marvin (April 14, 1808 – July 9, 1902) was a United States district judge of the United States District Court for the Southern District of Florida and the 7th governor of Florida.

== Education and career ==
Marvin was born in Fairfield, New York, on April 14, 1808, a son of Selden Marvin and Charlotte (Pratt) Marvin. He was raised on his family's farm, graduated from Homer Academy at age 15 and began teaching school. He later studied law with a local attorney, and he attained admission to the bar in 1833. He practiced in Phelps, New York, until 1835.

In 1835, Marvin was appointed United States Attorney for the Southern District of Florida Territory, and he served until 1839. He was a member of the Florida Territorial Council in 1837 and a delegate to the Florida Constitutional Convention of 1838–1839.

Marvin was Judge of the United States District Court for the Southern District of Florida Territory from 1839 to 1845. After leaving the bench, he resumed practicing law in Key West.

== Federal judicial service ==
On March 2, 1847, Marvin was nominated by President James K. Polk to the United States District Court for the Southern District of Florida, a new judgeship authorized by 9 Stat. 131. He was confirmed by the United States Senate on March 3, 1847, and received his commission the same day. He remained loyal to the Union during the American Civil War and his judicial service was terminated when he resigned on July 1, 1863. In 1861, Marvin served as mayor of Key West.

== Later career and death ==
Following his resignation from the federal bench, Marvin resumed private practice in New York City. At the end of the American Civil War, Marvin was appointed as provisional Governor of Florida by President Andrew Johnson, and he served from July 13, 1865, to December 20, 1865, and oversaw Florida's effort to repeal its secession ordinance and prepare to rejoin the Union. He was a United States senator-elect from Florida in 1866, but the United States Senate refused to seat him because Florida had not yet been readmitted to the Union. In 1866, Marvin served a second term as mayor of Key West.

Marvin left Florida during Reconstruction and continued practicing law in Skaneateles. He remained active in Democratic Party politics and served a term as president of the village of Skaneateles, in addition to running unsuccessful campaigns for New York State Senate and delegate to the 1894 state constitutional convention. He died in Skaneateles on July 9, 1902, at the age of 94. Marvin was buried at Lake View Cemetery in Skaneateles.

== Career as author ==
Marvin was the author of a nationally recognized textbook on marine salvage law, A Treatise on the Law of Wreck and Salvage. He also authored a second work, The Authorship of the Four Gospels.

== Family ==
In 1846, Marvin married Harriet Newell Foote, the daughter of Judge Elisha Foote. They were the parents of daughter Harriet, who was the wife of United States Army General Marshall I. Ludington. Harriet Foote died in 1848, and in 1867, Marvin married Elizabeth Riddle Jewett of Skaneateles.

Marvin's brother Richard P. Marvin was a member of the United States House of Representatives and later a New York state judge.

Legal offices
Preceded by Seat established by 9 Stat. 131	Judge of the United States District Court for the Southern District of Florida; 1847–1863	Succeeded by Thomas Jefferson Boynton
Political offices
Preceded by Abraham K. Allison	7th Governor of Florida; 1865	Succeeded by David S. Walker
