= James I. Cohn =

American judge (born 1948)

James Ivan Cohn

Senior Judge of the United States District Court for the Southern District of Florida
- Incumbent
- Assumed office August 5, 2016

Judge of the United States District Court for the Southern District of Florida
- In office August 1, 2003 – August 5, 2016
- Appointed by: George W. Bush
- Preceded by: Seat established by 116 Stat. 1758
- Succeeded by: Raag Singhal

Personal details
- Born: James Ivan Cohn; December 23, 1948 (age 77) Montgomery, Alabama, U.S.
- Education: University of Alabama (BS); Samford University (JD)

James Ivan Cohn (born December 23, 1948) is a senior United States district judge of the United States District Court for the Southern District of Florida.

== Early life and education ==
Cohn was born in 1948 in Montgomery, Alabama. He received his Bachelor of Science degree from the University of Alabama in 1971 and his Juris Doctor from the Cumberland School of Law at Samford University in 1974. While at Alabama, Cohn was a member of the Zeta Beta Tau fraternity.

== Career ==
Cohn served in the Alabama Army National Guard from 1970 to 1972, in the United States Army Reserves from 1972 to 1975, and in the Florida Army National Guard from 1975 to 1976. He served as assistant public defender in the Broward County, Florida, Public Defender's Office in 1975 and as assistant state attorney in the Broward County State Attorney's Office in 1975 to 1978. He was in private practice in Fort Lauderdale from 1978 to 1995; he worked for a year with the Michael Widoff law firm before beginning his own general trial practice in 1979. In 1995, he became a judge of the 17th Judicial Circuit Court of Florida.

=== Federal judicial service ===
President George W. Bush nominated Cohn on May 1, 2003 to the United States District Court for the Southern District of Florida, to the new seat created by 116 Stat. 1758. He was confirmed by the Senate on July 31, 2003, and he received his commission on August 1, 2003. He took senior status on August 5, 2016.

== See also ==
- List of Jewish American jurists

Legal offices
Preceded by Seat established by 116 Stat. 1758	Judge of the United States District Court for the Southern District of Florida; 2003–2016	Succeeded by Raag Singhal
