= Edward B. Davis =

American judge

Chief Judge of the United States District Court for the Southern District of Florida
- In office 1997–2000
- Preceded by: Norman Charles Roettger Jr.
- Succeeded by: William J. Zloch

Judge of the United States District Court for the Southern District of Florida
- In office October 5, 1979 – June 30, 2000
- Appointed by: Jimmy Carter
- Preceded by: Seat established by 92 Stat. 1629
- Succeeded by: Jose E. Martinez

Personal details
- Born: Edward Bertrand Davis; February 10, 1933 West Palm Beach, Florida
- Died: May 24, 2010 (aged 77) Miami, Florida
- Education: Fredric G. Levin College of Law (JD); New York University School of Law (LLM)

Edward Bertrand Davis (February 10, 1933 – May 24, 2010) was a United States district judge of the United States District Court for the Southern District of Florida.

== Education and career ==
Born in West Palm Beach, Florida, Davis served in the United States Army from 1953 to 1955. He received a Juris Doctor from the Fredric G. Levin College of Law at the University of Florida in 1960 and a Master of Laws from New York University School of Law in 1961. He was in private practice in Miami, Florida from 1961 until 1979.

== Federal judicial service ==
Davis was nominated by President Jimmy Carter on August 10, 1979, to the United States District Court for the Southern District of Florida, to a new seat authorized by 92 Stat. 1629. He was confirmed by the United States Senate on October 4, 1979, and received his commission on October 5, 1979. He served as Chief Judge from 1997 to 2000. His service terminated on June 30, 2000, due to retirement.

== Death ==
Davis died on May 24, 2010, in Miami.

== Sources ==
- Judge Edward B. (Ned) Davis - Obituary

Legal offices
Preceded by Seat established by 92 Stat. 1629	Judge of the United States District Court for the Southern District of Florida; 1979–2000	Succeeded by Jose E. Martinez
Preceded by Norman Charles Roettger Jr.	Chief Judge of the United States District Court for the Southern District of Florida; 1997–2000	Succeeded by William J. Zloch
