= Ted Cabot =

American judge

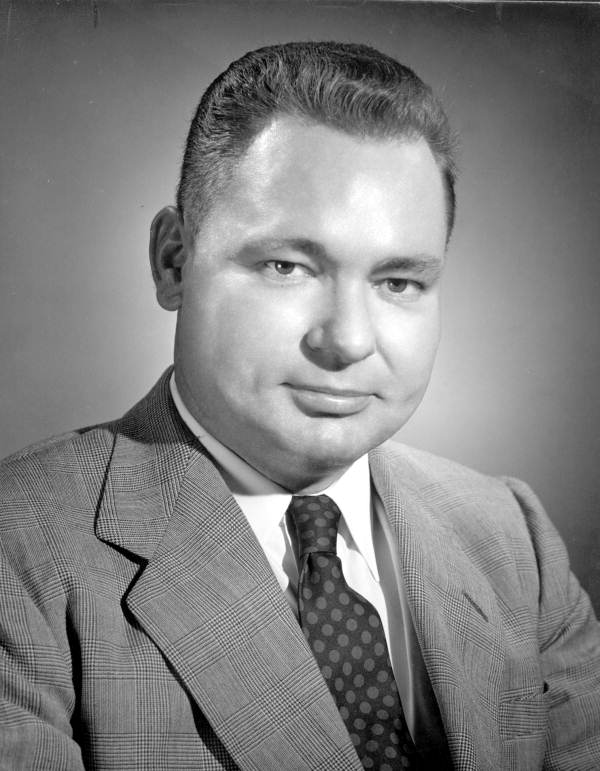

Judge of the United States District Court for the Southern District of Florida
- In office August 11, 1966 – December 4, 1971
- Appointed by: Lyndon B. Johnson
- Preceded by: Seat established by 80 Stat. 75
- Succeeded by: Norman Charles Roettger Jr.

Personal details
- Born: Ted Cabot; February 5, 1917 Hobe Sound, Florida
- Died: December 4, 1971 (aged 54)
- Party: Democratic
- Education: University of Miami School of Law (LL.B.)

Ted Cabot (February 5, 1917 – December 4, 1971) was a United States district judge of the United States District Court for the Southern District of Florida.

== Education and career ==
Born February 5, 1917, in Hobe Sound, Florida, Cabot served as Clerk of the Circuit Court for Broward County, Florida from 1945 to 1953. He received a Bachelor of Laws in 1953 from the University of Miami School of Law. He entered private practice in Fort Lauderdale, Florida from 1953 to 1959. He was a member of the Florida Senate from 1954 to 1958. He was a Judge of the Circuit Court in Broward County from 1959 to 1966.

== Federal judicial service ==
Cabot was nominated by President Lyndon B. Johnson on July 11, 1966, to the United States District Court for the Southern District of Florida, to a new seat authorized by 80 Stat. 75. He was confirmed by the United States Senate on August 10, 1966, and received his commission on August 11, 1966. His service terminated on December 4, 1971, due to his death.

== Notable case ==
"It is a third irony that Ted Cabot, who as a state senator helped sponsor legislation to authorize Broward County's purchase of Colored Beach in 1955, would seven years later as Broward circuit judge effectively desegregate Broward's public beaches by denying the City of Fort Lauderdale's request to enjoin the wade-ins", according to William G. Crawford Jr.

== Sources ==
Legal offices
Preceded by Seat established by 80 Stat. 75	Judge of the United States District Court for the Southern District of Florida; 1966–1971	Succeeded by Norman Charles Roettger Jr.
