= Lake Jones =

American judge

Judge of the United States District Court for the Southern District of Florida
- In office February 18, 1924 – June 7, 1930
- Appointed by: Calvin Coolidge
- Preceded by: Seat established by 42 Stat. 837
- Succeeded by: Seat abolished

Personal details
- Born: Lake Jones; February 10, 1867 Vicksburg, Mississippi
- Died: June 7, 1930 (aged 63) Jacksonville, Florida
- Education: Northwestern University Pritzker School of Law (LL.B.)

Lake Jones (February 10, 1867 – June 7, 1930) was an American lawyer and a United States district judge of the United States District Court for the Southern District of Florida.

== Education and career ==
Born in Vicksburg, Mississippi, Jones was a clerk and inspector for the United States Post Office Department from 1885 to 1909, and then graduated from Northwestern University Pritzker School of Law with a Bachelor of Laws in 1909. Jones was in private practice in Jacksonville, Florida, from 1909 to 1921, and was district counsel for the United States Shipping Board, Emergency Fleet Corporation from 1921 to 1924.

== Federal judicial service ==
Jones was nominated by President Calvin Coolidge on February 1, 1924, to the United States District Court for the Southern District of California, to a new seat authorized by 42 Stat. 837. He was confirmed by the United States Senate on February 18, 1924, and received his commission the same day. His service terminated on June 7, 1930, due to his death in Jacksonville.

== Sources ==
Legal offices
Preceded by Seat established by 42 Stat. 837	Judge of the United States District Court for the Southern District of Florida; 1924–1930	Succeeded by Seat abolished
