= Halsted L. Ritter =

American judge (1868–1951)

Halsted Ritter
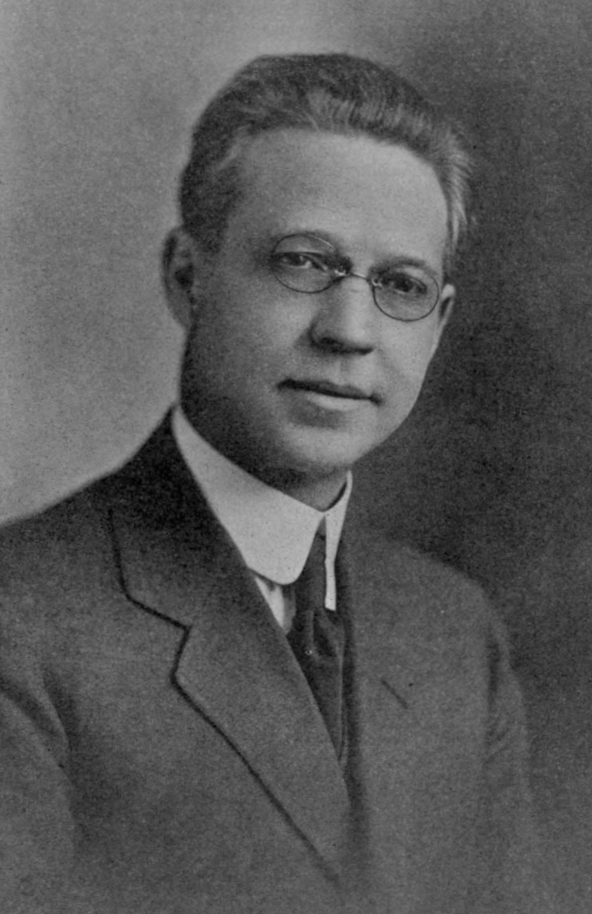

Judge of the United States District Court for the Southern District of Florida
- In office February 15, 1929 – April 17, 1936
- Appointed by: Calvin Coolidge
- Preceded by: Rhydon Mays Call
- Succeeded by: John W. Holland

Personal details
- Born: Halsted Lockwood Ritter; July 14, 1868 Indianapolis, Indiana, U.S.
- Died: October 15, 1951 (aged 83) Laurel, Mississippi, U.S.
- Party: Republican
- Relatives: Mary Ritter Beard (sister); Charles A. Beard (brother-in-law)
- Education: DePauw University (BPhil, LLB, MA)

Halsted Lockwood Ritter (July 14, 1868 – October 15, 1951) was a United States district judge of the United States District Court for the Southern District of Florida. He was the thirteenth individual to be impeached by the United States House of Representatives and the fourth individual to be convicted and removed from office in an impeachment trial before the United States Senate. He was also the last federal official to be impeached by the House of Representatives until Harry E. Claiborne (not counting Richard Nixon, who resigned before he was impeached), when he was impeached in 1936 and removed from office by the Senate on a general charge of misbehavior, after being acquitted on all six specific articles, including two counts of tax evasion.

== Education and career ==
Born on July 14, 1868, in Indianapolis, Indiana, Ritter received a Bachelor of Philosophy degree in 1891, a Bachelor of Laws in 1892, and an Artium Magister degree in 1893, all from DePauw University.

He entered private practice in Indianapolis from 1892 to 1895. He continued private practice in Denver, Colorado from 1895 to 1925. He was the Republican nominee for Governor of Colorado in 1912, after roughly two decades of legal practice in Denver.

In 1919, as a member of the Denver Lions Club, he attended the association's 3rd international convention in Chicago, where he proposed what would become the association's slogan - "liberty, intelligence, and our nation's safety", a backronym for the Lions name.

In 1925, he moved to West Palm Beach, Florida for his wife's health and continued in private practice until 1929. Ritter was the author of 1931's Washington as a Business Man, a work that explored George Washington's career as an entrepreneur and land speculator.

== Federal judicial service ==
Ritter was nominated by President Calvin Coolidge on January 23, 1929, to a seat on the United States District Court for the Southern District of Florida vacated by Judge Rhydon Mays Call. He was confirmed by the United States Senate on February 15, 1929, and received his commission the same day. His service terminated on April 17, 1936, due to his impeachment, conviction and removal from office.

=== Details of impeachment ===
On May 29, 1933, United States Representative J. Mark Wilcox of Florida introduced resolution (H. Res. 163) authorizing the House Judiciary Committee to investigate Ritter's conduct to "determine whether in the opinion of the committee he had been guilty of any high crime or misdemeanor."

On March 2, 1936, the United States House of Representatives voted to impeach Ritter by 181 votes to 146 (with 7 present and 96 not voting). The proceedings were only the 13th impeachment case in the 147 years of Congress.

On March 30, 1936, the House amended and expanded the articles of impeachment; the United States Senate ultimately voted on seven articles of impeachment.

The seven articles (as amended) alleged, among other things:

1. Article I: That Ritter fixed an additional and "exorbitant" fee of $75,000 for his former law partner, Albert L. Rankin, in the Whitehall foreclosure/receivership matter, and that Rankin paid Ritter $4,500 in cash, which Ritter "corruptly and unlawfully accepted and received."
2. Article II: That Ritter entered into an arrangement with Rankin and others connected with the Whitehall bankruptcy/receivership proceedings to keep the property in litigation in his court, allowed excessive and unwarranted fees, and received free rooms, meals and valet service at the Whitehall Hotel (including for family members/guests) at the expense of the receivership estate, among other alleged misconduct.
3. Article III: That after becoming a federal judge, Ritter was engaged in the practice of law and solicited/received a $2,000 fee in connection with the "Brazilian Court Building Corporation" litigation, appropriating the money for his own use.
4. Article IV: That Ritter was engaged in the practice of law while a federal judge in connection with the Boca Raton and Edgewater matters involving J. R. Francis and received $7,500 for that work.
5. Article V: That Ritter willfully attempted to evade federal income tax for 1929 (including by failing to report income described in the articles), allegedly receiving about $12,000 of taxable income above his judicial salary and paying no income tax on it.
6. Article VI: That Ritter willfully attempted to evade federal income tax for 1930 (including by failing to report income described in the articles), allegedly receiving about $5,300 of taxable income above his judicial salary and paying no income tax on it.
7. Article VII: A general article alleging misbehavior and high crimes and misdemeanors (incorporating the conduct alleged in the earlier articles and additional specified conduct) the reasonable and probable consequence of which was to bring his court into scandal and disrepute and undermine public confidence in the judiciary.

On March 6, 1936, the House appointed Hatton W. Sumners of Texas, Randolph Perkins of New Jersey, and Sam Hobbs of Alabama as managers to conduct the impeachment trial in the Senate. Ritter was represented by Frank P. Walsh and Carl T. Hoffman as counsel.

On April 6, 1936, the Senate began Ritter's impeachment trial. On April 17, 1936, the Senate voted to acquit Ritter on Articles I–VI and to convict him on Article VII (56 guilty to 28 not guilty), and Ritter was removed from office the same day. A motion to disqualify Ritter from holding any future federal office failed (yeas 0, nays 76). Article VII did not require that any specific charge be proven. It argued that the cumulative impression created by the conduct alleged in Articles I through VI — regardless of whether the Senate found him guilty of those specific charges — was itself sufficient grounds for removal.

Legal challenge to conviction

After he was removed, Ritter sued in federal court to recover the salary he would have earned as a judge. He argued that the Senate had no authority to convict him, since it had acquitted him on all six specific articles of impeachment and convicted him only on a seventh, general article. The court dismissed the case, ruling that impeachment is a power belonging to Congress alone, not something the courts can review. Ritter v. United States, 300 U.S. 668 (1937)

Ritter then asked the Supreme Court to hear the case. The Court declined. In his petition, he argued he had not been convicted on an impeachable charge, and said the Senate's action amounted to an attempt to "amend the Constitution without popular consent." Impeachment Is Appealed; Former Judge-Ritter Asks Supreme Court Review of Ouster, New York Times, Jan. 19, 1937

During the trial itself, the defense had asked the Senate to throw out Article VII, the general charge, entirely. The Senate refused. The New York Times reported that the defense had described the article as "a catch-all of all charges." "Judge Ritter Denies All House Charges", New York Times, April 4, 1936

Subsequent legal assessment

Ritter's conviction on a single general article, after acquittal on six specific ones, drew renewed legal and journalistic attention in the decades that followed.

Within days of the verdict, New York Times columnist Arthur Krock came to its defense. He reasoned that because federal judges hold office only so long as they exhibit "good behavior," the Senate was not required to establish a specific crime — only that a judge's conduct had compromised public confidence in the court. Krock also pointed to the Senate's unanimous vote against barring Ritter from future office. He read that vote as evidence the Senate did not view Ritter as having committed a specific crime, though the vote does not specify the senators' reasoning. In the Nation; Issues of Judicial Conduct Posed in Ritter Case, New York Times, April 22, 1936

Nearly four decades later, Ritter's case resurfaced amid the debate over whether to impeach President Nixon, as lawmakers grappled with whether impeachment demands proof of an actual crime. The New York Times observed that Ritter remained the only individual the Senate had convicted after acquitting him on every specific charge brought against him, having removed him instead on a general accusation. The article also noted that Nixon's defense team invoked Ritter's case to argue it set no precedent applicable to a president, since judges — unlike presidents — hold office only during "good behavior." Issue and Debate, New York Times, July 24, 1974

That same year, Yale law professor Charles L. Black Jr. published an influential study of impeachment, arguing that the further a case strays from clearly criminal conduct, the more difficult it becomes to determine with confidence whether the underlying behavior is genuinely impeachable. Charles L. Black Jr., Impeachment: A Handbook (Yale University Press, 1974)

Reporting on the same proceedings, a separate Times article noted that Nixon's case marked the first occasion since Ritter's removal in 1936 that a federal official had faced this kind of congressional reckoning. A Historic Charge, New York Times, July 28, 1974

A 2019 Congressional Research Service report on the constitutional basis for impeachment also discussed Ritter's case directly. It noted that his was the first impeachment ever challenged in court, and that he had argued the Senate improperly convicted him on a single general article after acquitting him on each of the six specific charges against him. Impeachment and the Constitution, Congressional Research Service, R46013 (Nov. 20, 2019; updated Dec. 6, 2023)

== Later career and death ==
After his removal from office, Ritter continued to practice law in Miami, Florida. He became ill while flying to the West Coast, and stopped in New Orleans, Louisiana. He subsequently traveled to Laurel, Mississippi, to recover while staying with friends. He died there on October 15, 1951.

== Personal ==
Ritter's sister was Mary Ritter Beard, the wife of Charles A. Beard; both were noted historians.

== Sources ==
- "Proceedings of the United States Senate". US Printing Office.
- Wilson, Wesley. "Coordinator of Archives and Special Collections". DePauw University. Archived from the original on October 29, 2013.
- "Halsted Lockwood Ritter - OpenJurist". m.openjurist.org.

Legal offices
Preceded by Rhydon Mays Call	Judge of the United States District Court for the Southern District of Florida; 1929–1936	Succeeded by John W. Holland
