= Donald M. Middlebrooks =

American judge (born 1946)

Donald Middlebrooks

Judge of the United States District Court for the Southern District of Florida
- Incumbent
- Assumed office May 27, 1997
- Appointed by: Bill Clinton
- Preceded by: James W. Kehoe

Personal details
- Born: Donald Marsh Middlebrooks; December 31, 1946 (age 79) Orlando, Florida, U.S.
- Education: University of Florida (BS, JD)

Donald Marsh Middlebrooks (born December 31, 1946) is a United States district judge of the United States District Court for the Southern District of Florida.

== Education and career ==
Middlebrooks was born in Orlando, Florida. He received a Bachelor of Science in Business Administration degree from the University of Florida in 1968. He received a Juris Doctor from the Fredric G. Levin College of Law at the University of Florida in 1972, and had served as student government president during his time in law school.

From 1973 to 1974, Middlebrooks was in private practice in Orlando, and was an assistant general counsel, governmental assistant, and general counsel for Governor Reubin Askew from 1974 to 1977. He returned to private practice for the next twenty years in West Palm Beach, Florida.

=== Federal judicial service ===
On January 7, 1997, President Bill Clinton nominated Middlebrooks to serve as a United States district judge of the United States District Court for the Southern District of Florida. He was nominated to the seat vacated by Judge James W. Kehoe. He was confirmed by the United States Senate on May 23, 1997, and received his commission on May 27, 1997.

== Notable cases ==
- Electronic Frontier Foundation vs. Shipping & Transit (2016): Middlebrooks dismissed the case against patent troll Martin Kelly Jones (Case No.:16-CV-80855-MIDDLEBROOKS/BRANNON).
- Donald J. Trump v. Hillary R. Clinton, et al. (2022): Middlebrooks dismissed the suit brought by Donald Trump against Hillary Clinton, the Democratic National Committee, and 26 others, seeking damages for alleged conduct surrounding the 2016 presidential election. Middlebrooks concluded that "most of Plaintiff’s claims are not only unsupported by any legal authority but plainly foreclosed by binding precedent as set forth by the Supreme Court and the Eleventh Circuit." and that Trump "is not attempting to seek redress for any legal harm; instead, he is seeking to flaunt a two-hundred-page political manifesto outlining his grievances against those that have opposed him, and this Court is not the appropriate forum." Two months after he dismissed the case, Middlebrooks assessed Trump's lawyers $50,000 in penalties, plus $16,000 to cover the legal fees paid by one of the defendants. In a later ruling, he imposed additional sanctions of $937,989.39 on Trump and his lead law firm in the litigation for bringing a lawsuit “in bad faith for an improper purpose” that “needlessly harmed” the defendants, “in order to dishonestly advance a political narrative.”

Legal offices
Preceded by James W. Kehoe	Judge of the United States District Court for the Southern District of Florida; 1997–present	Incumbent
