= Jose E. Martinez =

American judge (born 1941)

Judge of the United States District Court for the Southern District of Florida
- Incumbent
- Assumed office September 17, 2002
- Appointed by: George W. Bush
- Preceded by: Edward B. Davis

Personal details
- Born: July 28, 1941 (age 84) Santo Domingo, Dominican Republic
- Education: University of Miami (BBA, JD)

Jose E. Martinez (born July 28, 1941) is an American lawyer who serves as a United States district judge of the United States District Court for the Southern District of Florida.

== Early life and education ==
Martinez was born in 1941 in Santo Domingo, Dominican Republic. He received a Bachelor of Business Administration degree from the University of Miami in 1962 and a Juris Doctor from the University of Miami School of Law in 1965.

== Career ==
Martinez served in the United States Naval Reserve from 1964 to 1993, and was a Navy legal officer from 1965 to 1968.

Martinez served as a law clerk in private practice in 1965. He was an assistant United States attorney for the Southern District of Florida from 1968 to 1970. Martinez was in private practice in Florida from 1970 to 2002. From 1972 to 1974, he was regional director of the Office for Drug Abuse Law Enforcement of the Department of Justice.

=== Federal judicial service ===
President George W. Bush nominated Martinez to the United States District Court for the Southern District of Florida on January 23, 2002, to the seat vacated by Judge Edward B. Davis. He was confirmed by the Senate on September 13, 2002, and received his commission on September 17, 2002.

Martinez was the judge in Sinaltrainal v. Coca-Cola.

== See also ==
- List of Hispanic and Latino American jurists

Legal offices
Preceded by Edward B. Davis	Judge of the United States District Court for the Southern District of Florida; 2002–present	Incumbent
