= William Dimitrouleas =

American judge (born 1951)

William P. Dimitrouleas

Judge of the United States District Court for the Southern District of Florida
- Incumbent
- Assumed office May 22, 1998
- Appointed by: Bill Clinton
- Preceded by: Norman Charles Roettger Jr.

Personal details
- Born: March 28, 1951 (age 75) Lynn, Massachusetts
- Education: Furman University (BA); Fredric G. Levin College of Law (JD)

William Peter Dimitrouleas (born March 28, 1951) is a United States district judge of the United States District Court for the Southern District of Florida.

== Education and career ==
Born in Lynn, Massachusetts, Dimitrouleas received a Bachelor of Arts degree from Furman University in 1973 and a Juris Doctor from the Fredric G. Levin College of Law at the University of Florida in 1975. He was an assistant public defender for the 17th Judicial Circuit of Florida 1976 to 1977, and then an Assistant state attorney of the same circuit from 1977 to 1989. He was a circuit court judge of the 17th Judicial Circuit Court from 1989 to 1998.

== Federal judicial service ==
On January 27, 1998, Dimitrouleas was nominated by President Bill Clinton to a seat on the United States District Court for the Southern District of Florida vacated by Norman Charles Roettger Jr. Dimitrouleas was confirmed by the United States Senate on May 14, 1998, and received his commission on May 22, 1998.

=== Notable cases ===
- In 2023, Dimitrouleas presided over the trial of former Venezuela National Treasurer Claudia Díaz Guillen and her husband, Adrian Velásquez Figueroa, on charges of money laundering and bribery for accepting tens of millions of dollars in bribes in exchange for lucrative government contracts and then moving some of their illicit money to Miami. They were found guilty and Dimitrouleas sentenced them both to 15 years in Federal prison.

== Sources ==
Legal offices
Preceded by Norman Charles Roettger Jr.	Judge of the United States District Court for the Southern District of Florida; 1998–present	Incumbent
