= James William Locke =

American judge

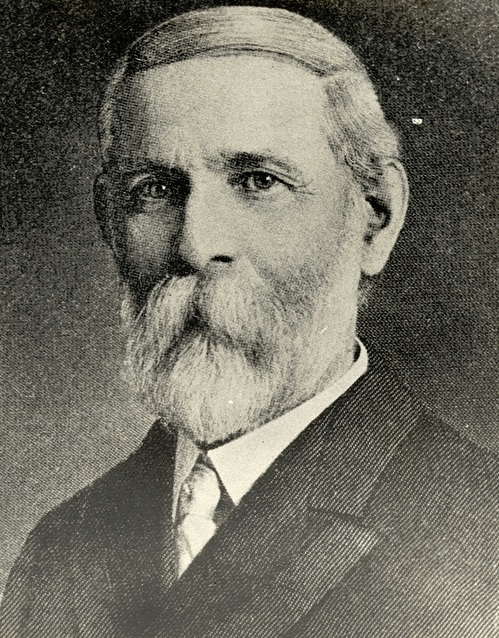

Judge of the United States District Court for the Southern District of Florida
- In office February 1, 1872 – July 4, 1912
- Appointed by: Ulysses S. Grant
- Preceded by: John McKinney
- Succeeded by: John Moses Cheney

Personal details
- Born: James William Locke; October 30, 1837 Wilmington, Vermont
- Died: September 5, 1922 (aged 84) Kittery, Maine
- Education: read law

James William Locke (October 30, 1837 – September 5, 1922) was a United States district judge of the United States District Court for the Southern District of Florida.

== Education and career ==
Born in Wilmington, Vermont, in 1837, Locke read law to enter the bar in 1859. Locke served as Paymaster's Clerk in the United States Navy from 1861 to 1865, during the American Civil War. He was in private practice in Key West, Florida, from 1865 to 1872. Locke served as county superintendent of education for Monroe County and as a clerk and later commissioner of the United States District Court for the Southern District of Florida. Locke served as a Judge of the Monroe County Court from 1868 to 1870, and as a member of the Florida Senate from 1870 to 1872.

== Federal judicial service ==
President Ulysses S. Grant nominated Locke to the United States District Court for the Southern District of Florida on January 15, 1872, to the seat vacated by Judge John McKinney. Confirmed by the United States Senate on February 1, 1872, he received commission on February 1, 1872. Locke ended service on July 4, 1912, retiring after over 40 years on the bench. He was President Grant's longest-serving judicial appointee, and the longest to have served as a federal judge in Florida. Locke died on September 5, 1922, in Kittery, Maine.

== See also ==
- List of United States federal judges by longevity of service

== Sources ==
Legal offices
Preceded by John McKinney	Judge of the United States District Court for the Southern District of Florida; 1872–1912	Succeeded by John Moses Cheney
