= Jeffrey Kuntz =

American judge (born 1981)

Jeffrey Thomas Kuntz
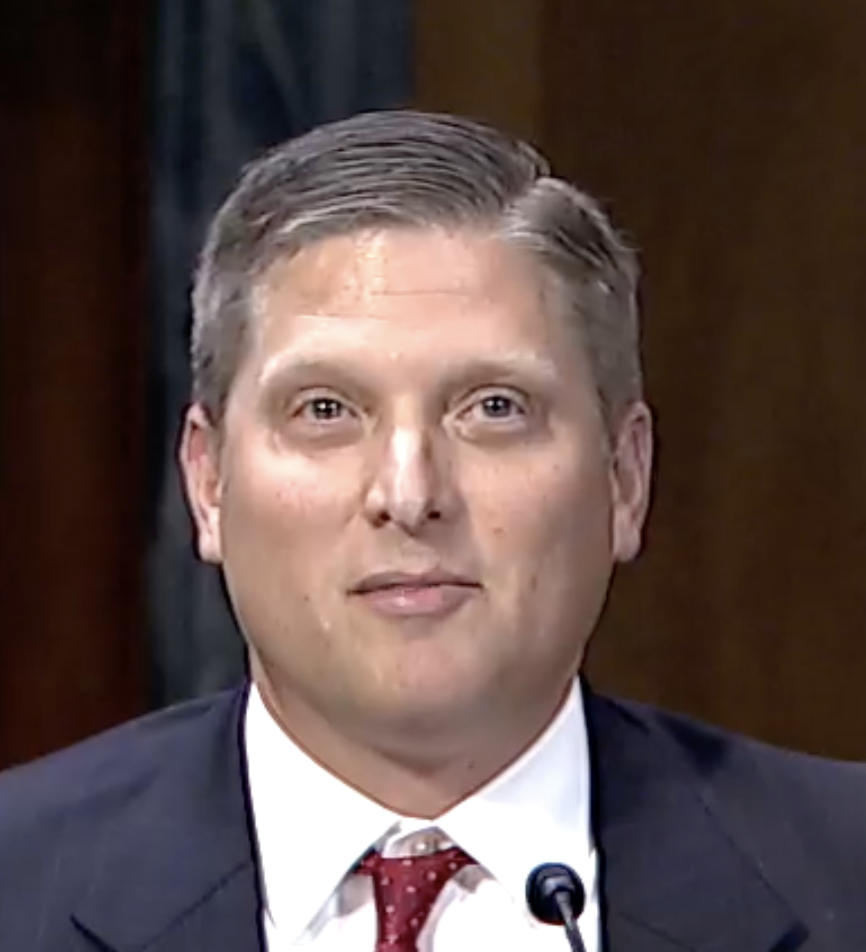

Judge of the United States District Court for the Southern District of Florida
- Incumbent
- Assumed office August 10, 2026
- Appointed by: Donald Trump
- Preceded by: Seat established

Personal details
- Born: Jeffrey Thomas Kuntz; 1981 (age 44–45) Winter Park, Florida, US
- Education: Boston College (BA); Suffolk University (JD)

Jeffrey Thomas Kuntz (born 1981) (known professionally as Jeffrey T. Kuntz) is an American lawyer who serves as a United States district judge of the United States District Court for the Southern District of Florida since 2026. He was a judge of the Florida Fourth District Court of Appeal from 2016 to 2026, serving as the chief judge from 2025 to 2026.

== Education ==
Kuntz was born in 1981 in Winter Park, Florida. He received his Bachelor of Arts degree in 2003 from Boston College and his Juris Doctor in 2006 from Suffolk University Law School. While attending law school, he was a member of the Journal of High Technology Law from 2004 to 2005 and its editor-in-chief from 2005 to 2006.

== Career ==
Kuntz was a lawyer in private practice in Florida from August 2006 to November 2016 at the law firm of GrayRobinson, PA. He began his work as an associate attorney, and in March 2013 was promoted to shareholder.

He was a judge of the Florida Fourth District Court of Appeal from November 2016 to August 2026, and was chief judge from 2025 to 2026.

=== Federal judicial service ===
On April 1, 2026, President Donald Trump announced his intention to nominate Kuntz to an undesignated seat on the United States District Court for the Southern District of Florida. On April 29, 2026, he had his confirmation hearing with the Senate Judiciary Committee. On June 18, 2026, the Judiciary Committee advanced his nomination on a 12–10 party-line vote. On July 15, 2026, cloture was invoked on his nomination by a 51–46 vote. On the same day he was confirmed by the same 51–46 vote margin. He received his judicial commission on August 10, 2026.

Legal offices
New seat	Judge of the United States District Court for the Southern District of Florida; 2026–present	Incumbent
