= List of federal judges appointed by Ulysses S. Grant =

Following is a list of all Article III United States federal judges appointed by President Ulysses S. Grant during his presidency. In total Grant appointed 46 Article III federal judges, making him the first president to appoint more federal judges than George Washington. Grant's appointments included 4 Justices to the Supreme Court of the United States, 10 judges to the United States circuit courts, and 32 judges to the United States district courts. Grant also appointed Edwin M. Stanton to the Supreme Court in 1869; Stanton was confirmed and his commission was issued, but died before he could accept his commission and take his seat.

Grant appointed 2 judges to the United States Court of Claims, an Article I tribunal.

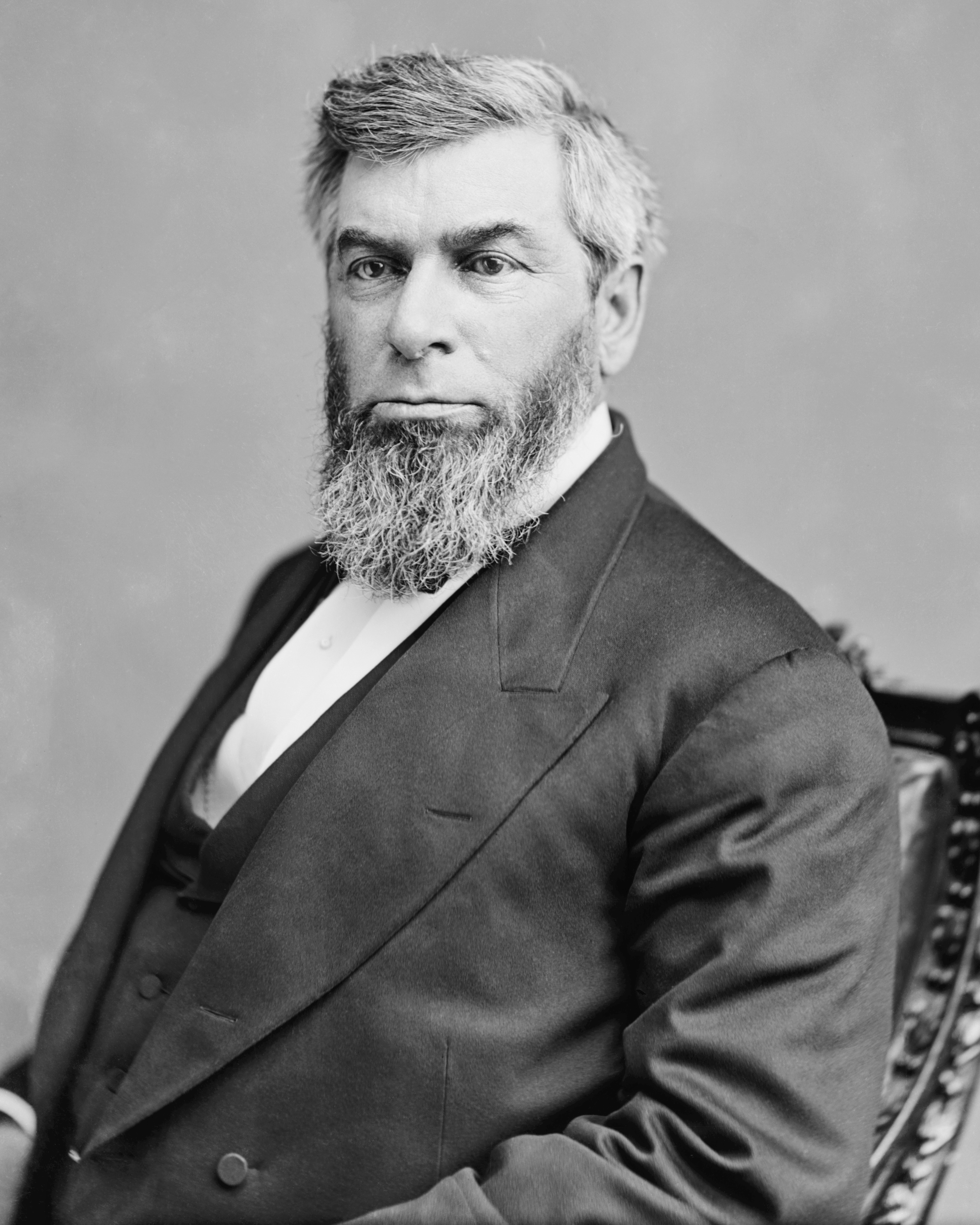
Grant appointed Morrison Remick Waite to be Chief Justice of the United States.

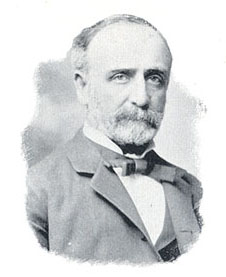
Moses Hallett was appointed by Grant to be the first judge of the United States District Court for the District of Colorado.

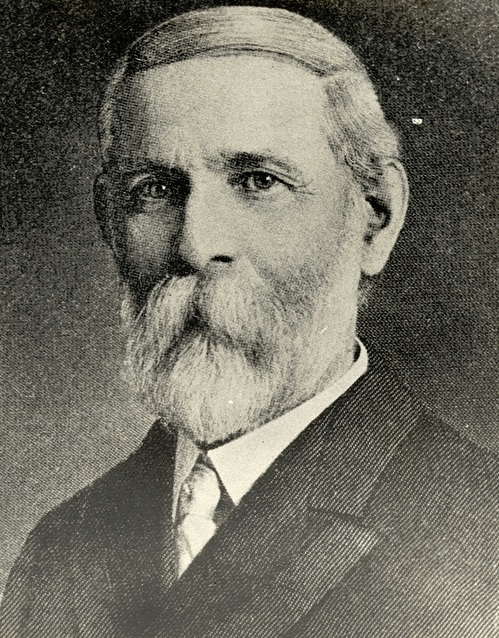
James William Locke served as a judge of the United States District Court for the Southern District of Florida for forty years, the longest tenure of any Grant appointee.

== United States Supreme Court justices ==
#	Justice	Seat	State	Former justice	Nomination date	Confirmation date	Began active service	Ended active service
1	William Strong	3	Pennsylvania	Robert Cooper Grier	February 7, 1870	February 18, 1870	February 18, 1870	December 14, 1880
2	Joseph P. Bradley	10	New Jersey	Seat established	February 7, 1870	March 21, 1870	March 21, 1870	January 22, 1892
3	Ward Hunt	1	New York	Samuel Nelson	December 3, 1872	December 11, 1872	December 11, 1872	January 27, 1882
4	Morrison Waite	Chief	Connecticut	Salmon P. Chase	January 19, 1874	January 21, 1874	January 21, 1874	March 23, 1888

== Circuit courts ==
#	Judge	Circuit	Nomination date	Confirmation date	Began active service	Ended active service
1	John Forrest Dillon	Eighth	December 9, 1869	December 22, 1869	December 22, 1869	September 1, 1879
2	Thomas Drummond	Seventh	December 8, 1869	December 22, 1869	December 22, 1869	July 18, 1884
3	William McKennan	Third	December 8, 1869	December 22, 1869	December 22, 1869	January 3, 1891
4	George Foster Shepley	First	December 8, 1869	December 22, 1869	December 22, 1869	July 20, 1878
5	Lewis Bartholomew Woodruff	Second	December 8, 1869	December 22, 1869	December 22, 1869	September 10, 1875
6	William Burnham Woods	Fifth	December 8, 1869	December 22, 1869	December 22, 1869	December 23, 1880
7	Lorenzo Sawyer	Ninth	December 8, 1869	January 10, 1870	January 10, 1870	September 7, 1891
8	Halmor Hull Emmons	Sixth	January 10, 1870	January 17, 1870	January 17, 1870	May 14, 1877
9	Hugh Lennox Bond	Fourth	April 6, 1870	July 13, 1870	July 13, 1870	October 24, 1893
10	Alexander S. Johnson	Second	December 15, 1875	December 15, 1875	October 25, 1875	January 26, 1878

== District courts ==
#	Judge	Court (Note: See List of United States district and territorial courts)	Nomination date	Confirmation date	Began active service	Ended active service
1	Walter Q. Gresham	D. Ind.	December 6, 1869	December 21, 1869	September 1, 1869	April 9, 1883
2	John Power Knowles	D.R.I.	December 6, 1869	January 24, 1870	October 9, 1869	March 21, 1881
3	Edgar Winters Hillyer	D. Nev.	December 15, 1869	December 21, 1869	December 21, 1869	May 10, 1882
4	Henry Williams Blodgett	N.D. Ill.	January 10, 1870	January 11, 1870	January 11, 1870	December 5, 1892
5	John W. Longyear	E.D. Mich.	February 7, 1870	February 18, 1870	February 18, 1870	March 10, 1875
6	John T. Nixon	D.N.J.	April 28, 1870	April 29, 1870	April 28, 1870	September 28, 1889
7	David Campbell Humphreys	D.D.C.	April 22, 1870	May 10, 1870	May 13, 1870	July 12, 1879
8	James C. Hopkins	W.D. Wis.	July 1, 1870 (Note: Renominated on July 9, 1870.)	July 9, 1870	July 9, 1870	September 3, 1877
9	Arthur MacArthur Sr.	D.D.C.	July 15, 1870	July 15, 1870	July 15, 1870	April 1, 1887
10	Joel C. C. Winch	E.D. Tex.	December 15, 1870	–	October 11, 1870	March 3, 1871
11	John McKinney	S.D. Fla.	December 7, 1870	February 18, 1871	November 8, 1870	October 12, 1871
12	Alexander Rives	W.D. Va.	February 3, 1871	February 6, 1871	February 6, 1871	August 1, 1882
13	William Story	W.D. Ark.	March 3, 1871	March 3, 1871	March 3, 1871	June 17, 1874
14	Philip Bergen Swing	S.D. Ohio	March 29, 1871	March 30, 1871	March 30, 1871	October 31, 1882
15	Edward Green Bradford	D. Del.	December 11, 1871	December 12, 1871	December 12, 1871	January 16, 1884
16	James William Locke	S.D. Fla.	January 15, 1872	February 1, 1872	February 1, 1872	July 4, 1912
17	Amos Morrill	E.D. Tex.	January 18, 1872	February 5, 1872	February 5, 1872	October 18, 1883
18	Robert P. Dick	W.D.N.C.	June 7, 1872	June 7, 1872	June 7, 1872	July 6, 1898
19	Nathaniel Shipman	D. Conn.	December 2, 1873	December 8, 1873	April 16, 1873	March 22, 1892
20	Martin Welker	N.D. Ohio	December 2, 1873	December 8, 1873	November 25, 1873	June 1, 1889
21	James Henry Howe	E.D. Wis.	December 9, 1873	December 11, 1873	December 11, 1873	January 1, 1875
22	Robert William Hughes	E.D. Va.	December 15, 1873	January 14, 1874	January 14, 1874	February 22, 1898
23	Cassius Gaius Foster	D. Kan.	March 9, 1874	March 10, 1874	March 10, 1874	February 28, 1899
24	William James Wallace	N.D.N.Y.	April 2, 1874	April 7, 1874	April 7, 1874	April 25, 1882
25	Charles E. Dyer	E.D. Wis.	February 10, 1875	February 10, 1875	February 10, 1875	May 18, 1888
26	John Bruce	M.D. Ala. N.D. Ala. S.D. Ala.	February 23, 1875	February 27, 1875	February 27, 1875	October 1, 1901; October 1, 1901; August 2, 1886
27	Henry Billings Brown	E.D. Mich.	March 17, 1875	March 19, 1875	March 19, 1875	December 30, 1890
28	Isaac C. Parker	W.D. Ark.	March 18, 1875	March 19, 1875	March 19, 1875	November 17, 1896
29	Edward Coke Billings	D. La./E.D. La.	January 10, 1876	February 10, 1876	February 10, 1876	December 1, 1893
30	Winthrop Welles Ketcham	W.D. Pa.	June 7, 1876	June 26, 1876	June 26, 1876	December 6, 1879
31	Moses Hallett	D. Colo.	January 9, 1877	January 12, 1877	January 12, 1877	April 7, 1906
32	Thomas Settle	N.D. Fla.	January 26, 1877	January 30, 1877	January 30, 1877	December 1, 1888

== Specialty courts (Article I) ==
=== United States Court of Claims ===
#	Judge	Nomination date	Confirmation date	Began active service	Ended active service
1	Charles D. Drake	December 12, 1870	December 12, 1870	December 12, 1870	December 12, 1885
2	William Adams Richardson	June 1, 1874	June 2, 1874	June 2, 1874	January 20, 1885

== Notes ==
Renominations

== Sources ==
- Federal Judicial Center
