= Eugene P. Spellman =

American judge

Judge of the United States District Court for the Southern District of Florida
- In office October 5, 1979 – May 4, 1991
- Appointed by: Jimmy Carter
- Preceded by: Seat established by 92 Stat. 1629
- Succeeded by: K. Michael Moore

Personal details
- Born: September 16, 1930 New York City, New York
- Died: May 4, 1991 (aged 60) Miami, Florida
- Education: University of Florida (BA); Fredric G. Levin College of Law (LLB)

Eugene P. Spellman (September 16, 1930 – May 4, 1991) was a United States district judge of the United States District Court for the Southern District of Florida.

== Education and career ==
Born in New York City, New York, Spellman received a Bachelor of Arts degree from the University of Florida in 1953. He received a Bachelor of Laws from the Fredric G. Levin College of Law at the University of Florida in 1955. He was in private practice of law in Florida from 1956 to 1957. He was a research assistant to the Chief Judge of the Third District Court of Appeals of the State of Florida from 1957 to 1958. He was an assistant attorney general of the Criminal Appeals Division in Tallahassee, Florida from 1958 to 1959. He was an assistant state attorney of Dade County (now Miami-Dade County), Florida from 1959 to 1961. He was in private practice of law in Florida from 1961 to 1979.

== Federal judicial service ==
Spellman was nominated by President Jimmy Carter on July 21, 1979, to the United States District Court for the Southern District of Florida, to a new seat created by 92 Stat. 1629. He was confirmed by the United States Senate on October 4, 1979, and received his commission on October 5, 1979. His service was terminated on May 4, 1991, due to his death of cancer at Mercy Hospital in Miami, Florida. He left the bench only one week before his death.

== Sources ==
Legal offices
Preceded by Seat established by 92 Stat. 1629	Judge of the United States District Court for the Southern District of Florida; 1979–1991	Succeeded by K. Michael Moore
