= Norman Charles Roettger Jr. =

American judge

Senior Judge of the United States District Court for the Southern District of Florida
- In office June 17, 1997 – July 26, 2003

Chief Judge of the United States District Court for the Southern District of Florida
- In office 1991–1997
- Preceded by: James Lawrence King
- Succeeded by: Edward B. Davis

Judge of the United States District Court for the Southern District of Florida
- In office June 2, 1972 – June 17, 1997
- Appointed by: Richard Nixon
- Preceded by: Ted Cabot
- Succeeded by: William Dimitrouleas

Personal details
- Born: Norman Charles Roettger Jr. November 3, 1930 Lucasville, Ohio, U.S.
- Died: July 26, 2003 (aged 72) Fort Lauderdale, Florida, U.S.
- Education: Ohio State University (B.A.); Washington and Lee University; School of Law (LL.B.)

Norman Charles Roettger Jr. (November 3, 1930 – July 26, 2003) was an American officer, lawyer and judge.

== Early life and education ==
Born in Lucasville, Ohio, Roettger received a Bachelor of Arts degree from Ohio State University in 1952. He received a Bachelor of Laws from Washington and Lee University School of Law in 1958.

== Military career ==
He was in the United States Navy as a Lieutenant (j.g.) from 1952 to 1955, subsequently serving in the United States Naval Reserve as a captain.

== Legal career ==
He was in private practice of law in Cincinnati, Ohio from 1958 to 1959. He was in private practice of law in Fort Lauderdale, Florida from 1959 to 1969. He was acting general counsel and deputy general counsel for the United States Department of Housing and Urban Development from 1969 to 1971. He was in private practice of law in Fort Lauderdale from 1971 to 1972.

Roettger was nominated by President Richard Nixon on April 13, 1972, to a seat on the United States District Court for the Southern District of Florida vacated by Judge Ted Cabot. He was confirmed by the United States Senate on May 31, 1972, and received his commission on June 2, 1972. During this time, he initially ruled in favor of former Treblinka extermination camp guard Feodor Fedorenko. He served as Chief Judge from 1991 to 1997. He assumed senior status on June 17, 1997. His service was terminated on July 26, 2003, due to his death in Fort Lauderdale.

Legal offices
Preceded by Ted Cabot	Judge of the United States District Court for the Southern District of Florida; 1972–1997	Succeeded by William Dimitrouleas
Preceded by James Lawrence King	Chief Judge of the United States District Court for the Southern District of Florida; 1991–1997	Succeeded by Edward B. Davis
