= Robert N. Scola Jr. =

American judge (born 1955)

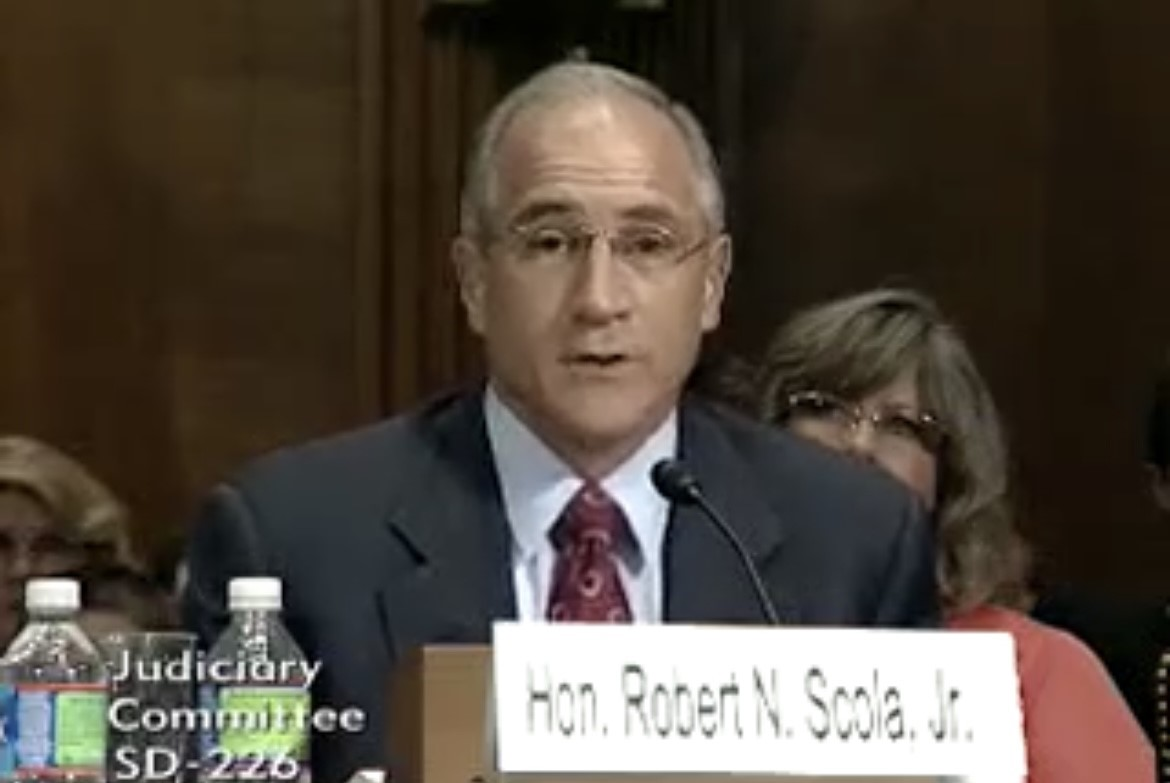

Senior Judge of the United States District Court for the Southern District of Florida
- Incumbent
- Assumed office October 31, 2023

Judge of the United States District Court for the Southern District of Florida
- In office October 20, 2011 – October 31, 2023
- Appointed by: Barack Obama
- Preceded by: Paul Huck
- Succeeded by: Ed Artau

Personal details
- Born: October 30, 1955 (age 70) Worcester, Massachusetts, U.S.
- Education: Brown University (BA); Boston College (JD)

Robert Nichols Scola Jr. (born October 30, 1955) is a senior United States district judge of the United States District Court for the Southern District of Florida.

== Early life and education ==
Scola earned a Bachelor of Arts degree in 1977 from Brown University and a Juris Doctor in 1980 from Boston College School of Law.

== Career ==
From 1980 until 1986, Scola worked in the Miami-Dade Office of the State Attorney. From 1986 until 1995, he worked in private legal practice, both as a sole legal practitioner and also as a criminal defense attorney. In 1995, Scola became a judge on Florida's Eleventh Judicial Circuit presiding over criminal, civil and family law matters.

=== Federal judicial service ===
On May 4, 2011, President Barack Obama nominated Scola to serve as a judge on the United States District Court for the Southern District of Florida. Scola would fill the seat vacated by Judge Paul Huck, who took senior status in August 2010. The United States Senate confirmed Scola in a voice vote on October 19, 2011; he received his commission the following day. He assumed senior status on October 31, 2023. Scola retired on October 3, 2025.

=== Notable cases ===
On April 29, 2019, Scola, a cancer survivor, recused himself from a case against healthcare insurance company UnitedHealth Group#UnitedHealthcare, stating, that the company's denial of treatment was "immoral and barbaric" and that his opinions regarding would prevent him from "deciding this case fairly and impartially."

Legal offices
Preceded by Paul Huck	Judge of the United States District Court for the Southern District of Florida; 2011–2023	Succeeded by Ed Artau
