= Raag Singhal =

American judge (born 1964)

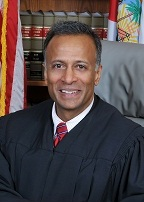

Judge of the United States District Court for the Southern District of Florida
- Incumbent
- Assumed office December 20, 2019
- Appointed by: Donald Trump
- Preceded by: James I. Cohn

Judge of the Seventeenth Judicial Circuit Court of Florida
- In office September 30, 2011 – December 20, 2019
- Appointed by: Rick Scott
- Preceded by: Victor Tobin
- Succeeded by: Michael Davis

Personal details
- Born: Anuraag Hari Singhal; 1963 (age 62–63) Philadelphia, Pennsylvania, U.S.
- Children: 3
- Education: Rice University (BA); Wake Forest University (JD)

Anuraag Hari "Raag" Singhal (born 1963) is a United States district judge of the United States District Court for the Southern District of Florida. He previously served as a Florida Circuit Court from 2011 to 2019.

== Early life and education ==
Singhal was born in Philadelphia, Pennsylvania to parents who emigrated to the U.S. from India. His parents were from Aligarh, Uttar Pradesh.

Singhal received a Bachelor of Arts from Rice University. He earned his Juris Doctor from the Wake Forest University School of Law.

== Career ==
He began his career as an associate at Fleming, O'Bryan & Fleming in 1989, and spent a year there before becoming an Assistant State Attorney in Broward County. From 1993 to 2011, Singhal maintained a criminal defense and appellate practice in the Fort Lauderdale area. From 1990 to 2011, Singhal was lead counsel on more than 200 jury trials, including more than 30 first degree murder cases. He was appointed to Seventeenth Judicial Circuit Court of Florida by Governor Rick Scott and served from 2011 to 2019.

=== State supreme court consideration ===
In January 2019, Singhal was considered for one of three vacancies on the Supreme Court of Florida by Governor Ron DeSantis.

=== Federal judicial service ===
In 2017, Singhal was one of ten finalists considered for a federal judgeship in South Florida. On August 14, 2019, President Donald Trump announced his intent to nominate Singhal to serve as a United States district judge of the United States District Court for the Southern District of Florida. On September 9, 2019, his nomination was sent to the Senate. He was nominated to the seat vacated by James I. Cohn, who assumed senior status on August 5, 2016. On September 11, 2019, a hearing on his nomination was held before the Senate Judiciary Committee. On October 24, 2019, his nomination was reported out of committee by a 17–5 vote.

On December 18, 2019, the United States Senate invoked cloture on his nomination by a 76–18 vote. On December 19, 2019, his nomination was confirmed by a 76–17 vote. He received his judicial commission on December 20, 2019. Singhal is the first Asian Pacific American and Indian American to serve as an Article III federal judge on a court within the Eleventh Circuit.

== Memberships ==
Singhal became a member of the Federalist Society in 1988 and then rejoined in 2011.

From 2016 to 2017, he was President of the Stephen R. Booher Chapter of the American Inns of Court.

== Personal life ==
He is married to Lisa Kay, a physician, and has three children.

== See also ==
- List of Asian American jurists

Legal offices
Preceded by Victor Tobin	Judge of the Seventeenth Judicial Circuit Court of Florida; 2011–2019	Succeeded by Michael Davis
Preceded by James I. Cohn	Judge of the United States District Court for the Southern District of Florida; 2019–present	Incumbent
