= Rhydon Mays Call =

American judge (1858–1927)

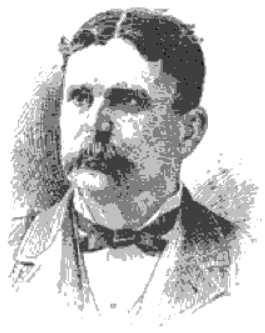

Judge of the United States District Court for the Southern District of Florida
- In office March 26, 1913 – December 15, 1927
- Appointed by: Woodrow Wilson
- Preceded by: John Moses Cheney
- Succeeded by: Halsted L. Ritter

Personal details
- Born: January 13, 1858 Fernandina Beach, Florida
- Died: December 15, 1927 (aged 69)
- Education: Washington and Lee University; School of Law (LL.B.)

Rhydon Mays Call (January 13, 1858 – December 15, 1927) was a United States district judge of the United States District Court for the Southern District of Florida.

== Education and career ==
Born on January 13, 1858, in Fernandina Beach, Florida, Call received a Bachelor of Laws in 1878 from Washington and Lee University School of Law. He was the nephew of U.S. Senator Wilkinson Call. He entered private practice in Jacksonville, Florida from 1881 to 1893. He was a Judge of the Circuit Court of Florida for the Fourth Judicial Circuit from 1893 to 1913.

== Federal judicial service ==
Call received a recess appointment from President Woodrow Wilson on March 26, 1913, to a seat on the United States District Court for the Southern District of Florida vacated by Judge John Moses Cheney. He was nominated to the same position by President Wilson on April 12, 1913. He was confirmed by the United States Senate on April 24, 1913, and received his commission the same day. His service terminated on December 15, 1927, due to his death.

Legal offices
Preceded by John Moses Cheney	Judge of the United States District Court for the Southern District of Florida; 1913–1927	Succeeded by Halsted L. Ritter
