= Ursula Mancusi Ungaro =

American judge (born 1951)

Ursula Ungaro

Senior Judge of the United States District Court for the Southern District of Florida
- In office May 2, 2021 – May 31, 2021

Judge of the United States District Court for the Southern District of Florida
- In office October 9, 1992 – May 2, 2021
- Appointed by: George H. W. Bush
- Preceded by: Seat established by 104 Stat. 5089
- Succeeded by: Melissa Damian

Personal details
- Born: January 29, 1951 (age 75) Miami Beach, Florida, U.S.
- Education: University of Miami (BA); University of Florida College of Law (JD)

Ursula Mancusi Ungaro (formerly Ungaro-Benages; born January 29, 1951) is a former United States district judge of the United States District Court for the Southern District of Florida.

== Education ==
Ungaro was born in 1951 in Miami Beach, Florida. She graduated from the University of Miami with a Bachelor of Arts degree in 1973 and from the University of Florida College of Law with a Juris Doctor in 1975.

== Career ==
Ungaro was in private practice in Miami from 1976 to 1987. Ungaro practiced at Frates Floyd Pearson Stewart Richman & Greer from 1976 to 1978, Blackwell Walker Gray Powers Flick & Hoelhl from 1978 to 1980, Finley Kumble Heine Underberg Manley & Casey from 1980 to 1985, and was a shareholder at Sparber Shevin Shapo Heilbronner & Book, P.A. from 1985 to 1987. Ungaro was a judge of the Eleventh Judicial Circuit of Florida from 1987 to 1992.

== Federal judicial service ==
President George H. W. Bush nominated Ungaro-Benages to the United States District Court for the Southern District of Florida on November 26, 1991, to the new seat created by 104 Stat. 5089. She was confirmed by the Senate on October 8, 1992, and she received commission on October 9, 1992. She assumed senior status on May 2, 2021, and retired on May 31, 2021, to join the Boies Schiller law firm. In 2022, The Daily Business Review honored her with the 2022 Lifetime Achievement award.

== Notable cases ==
On September 10, 1998, Judge Ungaro-Benages (presiding in the U.S. District Court for the Southern District of Florida) ruled that an Establishment Clause challenge to Congress's 1954 addition of the words "under God" in the Pledge of Allegiance was "so patently lacking in merit as to be frivolous." The plaintiff in that case subsequently filed a similar lawsuit in California, where the 9th Circuit Court of Appeals eventually ruled in the plaintiff's favor.

On April 26, 2012, Ungaro ruled that an order issued by Florida Governor Rick Scott to randomly drug test 80,000 Florida state workers was unconstitutional. Ungaro found that Scott had not demonstrated that there was a compelling reason for the tests and that, as a result, they were an unreasonable search in violation of the Constitution.

On December 19, 2018, Ungaro ruled, in Gubarev v. Buzzfeed, that Buzzfeed had not committed defamation in printing, in full, the Steele dossier. The claim was brought by Aleksej Gubarev, a Russian internet entrepreneur, who claimed to have been defamed by the publishing of the dossier by the media company, Buzzfeed. In part, Ungaro ruled the law of defamation does not equally apply to media institutions and does not require institutions to spend considerable resources to go line by line and determine the veracity of every claim in news reports. Ruling "Such a line-by-line review would curtail the scope of the privilege and thus restrict the press’s ability to serve its basic function." For Buzzfeed, the use of a hyperlink citing a CNN article which contained a two-page synopsis of the report was sufficient to allow Buzzfeed to publish the report. The lawyers for Gubarev vowed to appeal the decision to the 11th Circuit Court of Appeals and specifically intend to argue the hyperlink to the original CNN article was insufficient. Buzzfeed's counsel praised the ruling "We are extremely pleased that Judge Ungaro affirmed our client’s First Amendment rights in this matter. Fighting against restraints on reporting and maintaining public confidence in the constitutionally-mandated right to a free and unfettered press is vitally important, perhaps more so now than ever. The ruling is a strong affirmation of the First Amendment. It’s more important that the public know what is being discussed at the highest levels of government than anything else. If BuzzFeed had not published, citizens would not understand the current conflict between the president and the other branches of government, as well as the conflict between the president and the special counsel."

On May 9, 2018, Judge Ungaro was assigned an FDA Case (US Vs US Stem Cells). The FDA is attempting to stop stem cell clinics from operating and selling an adipose tissue derived product called Stromal Vascular Fraction. Customers would undergo a minor liposuction to harvest stem cells which would then be used to treat various health issues.

US Stem Cells Inc. had a permanent injunction granted against them on June 3, 2019 to stop performing Stromal Vascular Fraction procedures. Judge Ungaro released a stay order on July 19, 2019 to delay the destruction of the banked cells.

On June 2, 2021, the United States Court of Appeals for the Eleventh Circuit affirmed Judge Ungaro's ruling, holding that U.S. Stem Cell's stem cell therapy did not fall under any exceptions to FDA regulation.

== Sources ==
Legal offices
Preceded by Seat established by 104 Stat. 5089	Judge of the United States District Court for the Southern District of Florida; 1992–2021	Succeeded by Melissa Damian
