= K. Michael Moore =

American judge (born 1951)

Kevin Michael Moore

Chief Judge of the United States District Court for the Southern District of Florida
- In office July 1, 2014 – July 1, 2021
- Preceded by: Federico A. Moreno
- Succeeded by: Cecilia Altonaga

Judge of the United States District Court for the Southern District of Florida
- Incumbent
- Assumed office February 10, 1992
- Appointed by: George H. W. Bush
- Preceded by: Eugene P. Spellman

4th Director of the United States Marshals Service
- In office November 6, 1989 – February 24, 1992
- President: George H. W. Bush
- Preceded by: Stanley E. Morris
- Succeeded by: Henry E. Hudson

Personal details
- Born: July 17, 1951 (age 75) Coral Gables, Florida, U.S.
- Education: Florida State University (BA); Fordham University (JD)

Kevin Michael Moore (born July 17, 1951) is a United States district judge of the United States District Court for the Southern District of Florida.

== Early life and education ==
Moore was born in 1951 in Coral Gables, Florida, the fifth of seven children, to Thomas Francis Moore, Jr. and Janet Fay Moore. He received his Bachelor of Arts degree from Florida State University in 1972 and his Juris Doctor from Fordham University School of Law in 1976.

== Career ==
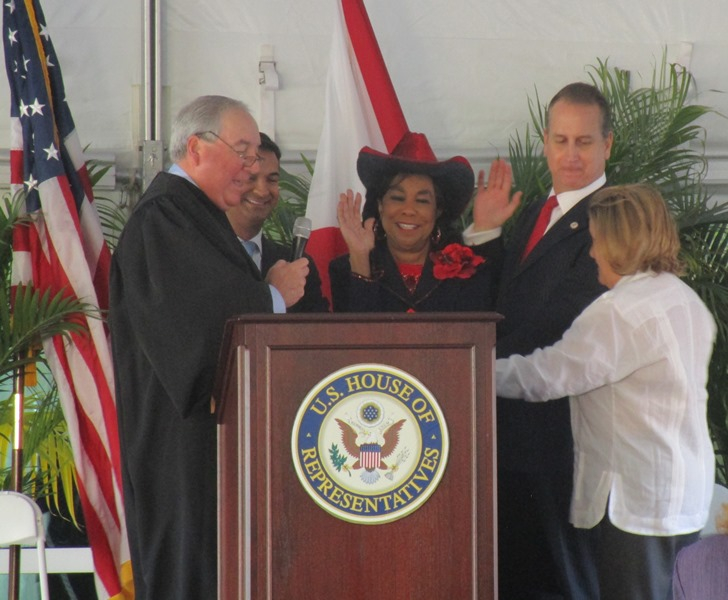
Chief Judge Kevin Michael Moore, swearing in Members of Congress Carlos Curbelo, Frederica Wilson, Mario Díaz-Balart, and Ileana Ros-Lehtinen. (February 2015)

Moore served as an assistant United States attorney for the Southern District of Florida from 1976 to 1981, as supervisory assistant United States attorney for the Northern District of Florida from 1981 to 1982, and as assistant United States attorney for the Northern District of Florida from 1983 to 1987. Moore served as the United States attorney for the Northern District of Florida from 1987 to 1989. From 1989 to 1992, Moore served as director of the United States Marshals Service at the United States Department of Justice.

=== Federal judicial service ===
Moore was nominated by President George H. W. Bush on October 4, 1991, to the United States District Court for the Southern District of Florida, to the seat vacated by Judge Eugene P. Spellman. He was confirmed by the Senate on February 6, 1992, and received his commission on February 10, 1992. He served as chief judge from July 1, 2014, until July 1, 2021.

=== Intent to nominate to United States Sentencing Commission ===
On August 12, 2020, President Donald Trump announced his intent to nominate Moore to serve as chair of the United States Sentencing Commission.

== Notable cases ==
On March 21, 2000, Moore issued a fifty-page ruling declaring that only United States Attorney General Janet Reno could grant political asylum to keep 6-year-old Cuban rafter survivor Elian Gonzalez in the United States. During his tenure on the bench, Judge Moore has overseen other high-profile cases, including the prosecution of the notorious Miami drug gang the "Boobie Boys," the sentencing of Sandra Avila Beltran, the "Queen of the Pacific," to seventy months imprisonment for her role in a conspiracy to import cocaine to the United States, and the first trial conviction of a synthetic marijuana distributor in South Florida.

== See also ==
- List of United States federal judges by longevity of service

Legal offices
Preceded by Eugene P. Spellman	Judge of the United States District Court for the Southern District of Florida; 1992–present	Incumbent
Preceded by Federico A. Moreno	Chief Judge of the United States District Court for the Southern District of Florida; 2014–2021	Succeeded by Cecilia Altonaga
