= John Moses Cheney =

American judge (1859–1922)

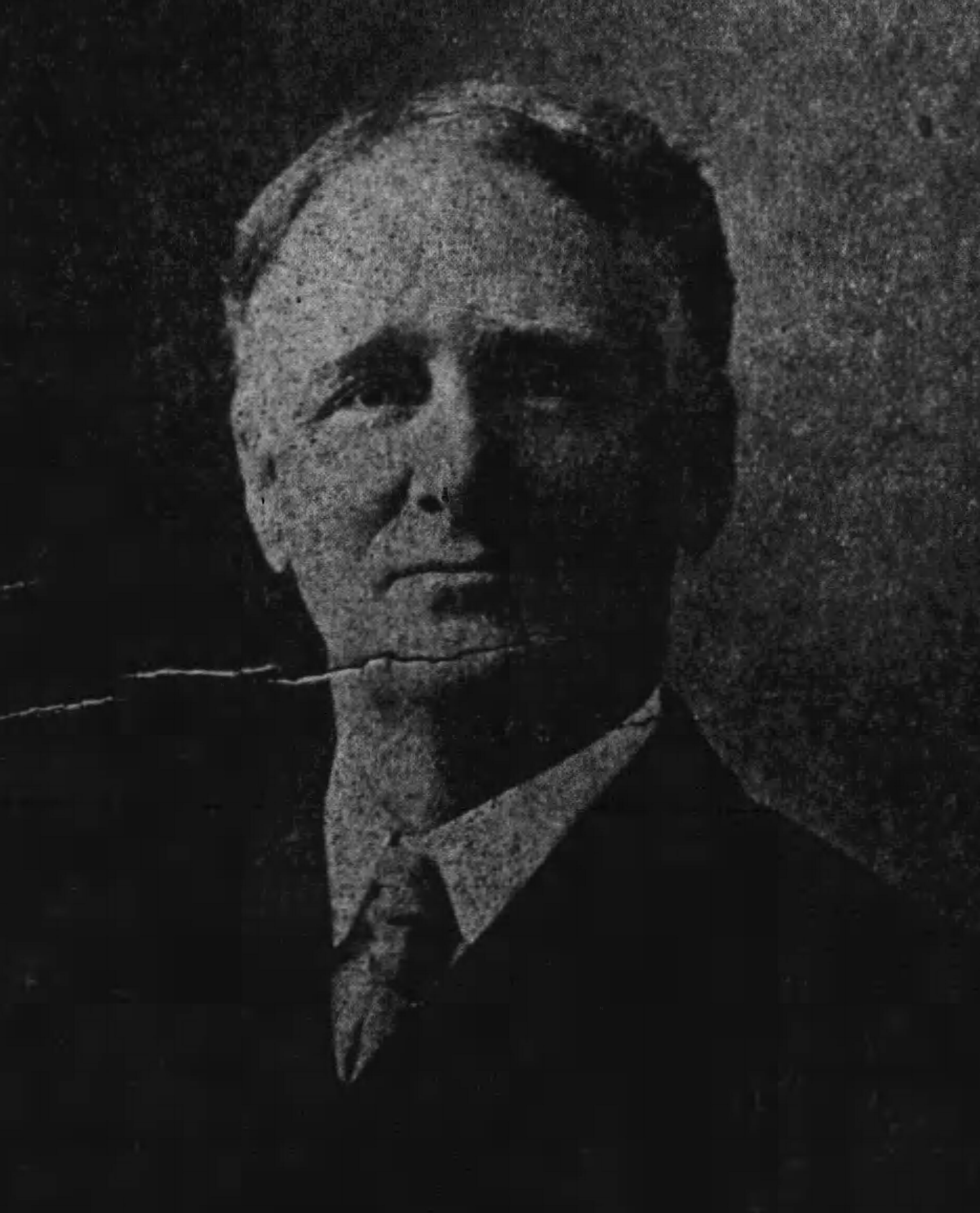

Judge of the United States District Court for the Southern District of Florida
- In office August 26, 1912 – March 3, 1913
- Appointed by: William Howard Taft
- Preceded by: James William Locke
- Succeeded by: Rhydon Mays Call

Personal details
- Born: John Moses Cheney; January 6, 1859 Milwaukee, Wisconsin
- Died: June 2, 1922 (aged 63) Orlando, Florida
- Education: Boston University School of Law (LL.B.)

John Moses Cheney (January 6, 1859 – June 2, 1922) was a Florida attorney and a United States district judge of the United States District Court for the Southern District of Florida. A Republican, Cheney represented African American clients during the segregation era and supported voter registration drives during his U.S. Senate campaign in the era of white supremacy supported by the Democratic Party in Florida and across the south. Efforts to register African Americans resulted in the Ocoee massacre.

== Education and career ==
Born on January 6, 1859, in Milwaukee, Wisconsin, Cheney received a Bachelor of Laws in 1885 from the Boston University School of Law. He entered private practice in Orlando, Florida from 1886 to 1906. He was city attorney for Orlando from 1889 to 1890. He was a Supervisor for the United States Census for Florida in 1900. He was the owner of the Orlando Light and Water Company from 1901 to 1922. He was the United States Attorney for the Southern District of Florida from 1906 to 1912.

== Federal judicial service ==
Cheney received a recess appointment from President William Howard Taft on August 26, 1912, to a seat on the United States District Court for the Southern District of Florida vacated by Judge James William Locke. He was nominated to the same position by President Taft on December 3, 1912. His service terminated on March 3, 1913, after his nomination was not confirmed by the United States Senate, which never held a vote on his nomination.

== Later career and death ==
Cheney resumed private practice in Orlando from 1913 to 1922. He died on June 2, 1922, in Orlando.

== See also ==
- Ocoee massacre

== Sources ==
Party political offices
Preceded by Matthew B. MacFarlane	Republican nominee for Governor of Florida; 1908	Succeeded by William R. O'Neal
First	Republican Party nominee for U.S. Senator from Florida (Class 3); 1920	Vacant Title next held by Thomas E. Swanson
Legal offices
Preceded by James William Locke	Judge of the United States District Court for the Southern District of Florida; 1912–1913	Succeeded by Rhydon Mays Call
