= Rodolfo Ruiz =

American judge (born 1979)

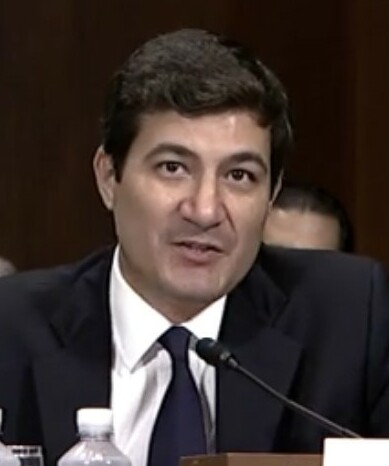

Judge of the United States District Court for the Southern District of Florida
- Incumbent
- Assumed office May 3, 2019
- Appointed by: Donald Trump
- Preceded by: William J. Zloch

Judge of the Eleventh Judicial Circuit Court of Florida
- In office November 2014 – May 6, 2019
- Appointed by: Rick Scott
- Preceded by: Beth Bloom
- Succeeded by: Laura Cruz

Judge of the Miami-Dade County Court
- In office April 2012 – November 2014
- Appointed by: Rick Scott

Personal details
- Born: Rodolfo Armando Ruiz II; 1979 (age 46–47) Miami, Florida, U.S.
- Education: Duke University (BA); Georgetown University (JD)

Rodolfo Armando Ruiz II (born 1979) is a United States district judge of the United States District Court for the Southern District of Florida and former Florida state court judge.

== Education and career ==
Ruiz attended Ransom Everglades School in Miami, Florida, and played water polo on the 1997 state championship team.

Ruiz received a Bachelor of Arts from Duke University. He earned his Juris Doctor in 2005 from the Georgetown University Law Center. He began his legal career as a law clerk to Judge Federico A. Moreno of the United States District Court for the Southern District of Florida.

Ruiz served as an Assistant County Attorney for the Miami-Dade County's Attorney's office. From 2012 to 2014 he served as a judge of the Miami-Dade County Court. Governor Rick Scott appointed him to the Eleventh Judicial Circuit Court in 2014 and he served in that capacity until his appointment to the federal bench in 2019.

== Federal judicial service ==
Ruiz was mentioned as a potential judicial nominee in February 2018. On April 26, 2018, President Donald Trump announced his intent to nominate Ruiz to serve as a United States District Judge of the United States District Court for the Southern District of Florida. On May 7, 2018, his nomination was sent to the Senate. He was nominated to the seat vacated by Judge William J. Zloch, who assumed senior status on January 31, 2017. On June 20, 2018, a hearing on his nomination was held before the Senate Judiciary Committee. On July 19, 2018, his nomination was reported out of committee by a voice vote.

On January 3, 2019, his nomination was returned to the President under Rule XXXI, Paragraph 6 of the United States Senate. On January 23, 2019, President Trump announced his intent to renominate Ruiz for a federal judgeship. His nomination was sent to the Senate later that day. On February 7, 2019, his nomination was reported out of committee by a voice vote. On May 1, 2019, the Senate invoked cloture on his nomination by a 89–10 vote. On May 2, 2019, his nomination was confirmed by a 90–8 vote. He received his judicial commission on May 3, 2019.

== Memberships ==
On his Senate Judiciary Committee questionnaire, Ruiz reported being a member of a number of bar associations and legal committees, including the American Bar Association, Federalist Society, and the Hispanic National Bar Association.

== See also ==
- List of Hispanic and Latino American jurists

Legal offices
Preceded by Beth Bloom	Judge of the Eleventh Judicial Circuit Court of Florida; 2014–2019	Succeeded by Laura Cruz
Preceded by William J. Zloch	Judge of the United States District Court for the Southern District of Florida; 2019–present	Incumbent
