= Melissa Damian =

American judge (born 1968)

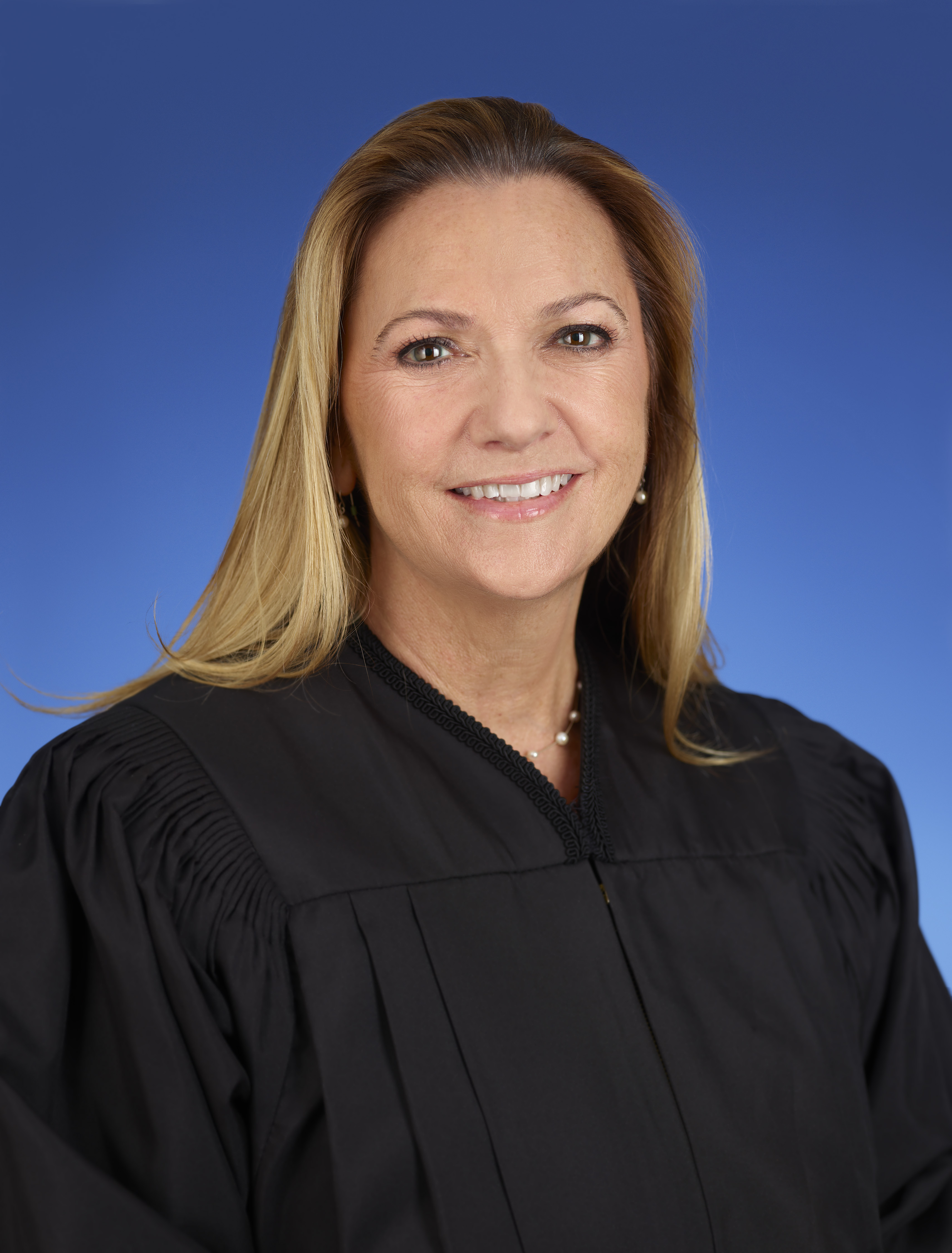

Judge of the United States District Court for the Southern District of Florida
- Incumbent
- Assumed office March 4, 2024
- Appointed by: Joe Biden
- Preceded by: Ursula Mancusi Ungaro

Magistrate Judge of the United States District Court for the Southern District of Florida
- In office January 10, 2022 – March 4, 2024

Personal details
- Born: 1968 (age 57–58) Coral Gables, Florida, U.S.
- Education: Princeton University (BA); University of Miami (JD)

Melissa Jean Damian (born 1968) is an American lawyer who has served as a United States district judge of the United States District Court for the Southern District of Florida since 2024. She previously served as a United States magistrate judge of the same court from 2022 to 2024.

== Education ==
Damian received a Bachelor of Arts from Princeton University in 1990 and a Juris Doctor from the University of Miami School of Law in 1995.

== Career ==
Damian served as a law clerk for Judge Ursula Mancusi Ungaro of the United States District Court for the Southern District of Florida from 1995 to 1997. From 1997 to 1999, she was an associate at Kenny Nachwalter, P.A. at their Miami office. From 1999 to 2010, she served as an assistant United States attorney in the U.S. Attorney's Office for the Southern District of Florida, where she worked in the National Security Division. From 2010 to 2013, she was appellate counsel at The Ferraro Law Firm. From 2013 to 2021, Damian worked in private legal practice as Of counsel at Damian & Valori. From 2022 to 2024, she served as a United States magistrate judge for the Southern District of Florida.

=== Federal judicial service ===
On November 1, 2023, President Joe Biden announced his intent to nominate Damian to serve as a United States district judge of the United States District Court for the Southern District of Florida. On November 6, 2023, her nomination was sent to the Senate. President Biden nominated Damian to the seat vacated by Judge Ursula Mancusi Ungaro, who assumed senior status on May 2, 2021. On November 29, 2023, a hearing on her nomination was held before the Senate Judiciary Committee. On January 3, 2024, her nomination was returned to the president under Rule XXXI, Paragraph 6 of the United States Senate and she was renominated on January 8, 2024. On January 18, 2024, her nomination was reported out of committee by a 19–2 vote. On February 28, 2024, the Senate invoked cloture on her nomination by a 77–20 vote. Later that day, her nomination was confirmed by a 77–20 vote. She received her judicial commission on March 4, 2024.

Legal offices
Preceded by Ursula Mancusi Ungaro	Judge of the United States District Court for the Southern District of Florida; 2024–present	Incumbent
