= United States District Court for the Southern District of Florida =

United States federal district court in Florida

Coordinates: 25.7780°N 80.1943°W

- (S.D. Fla.)
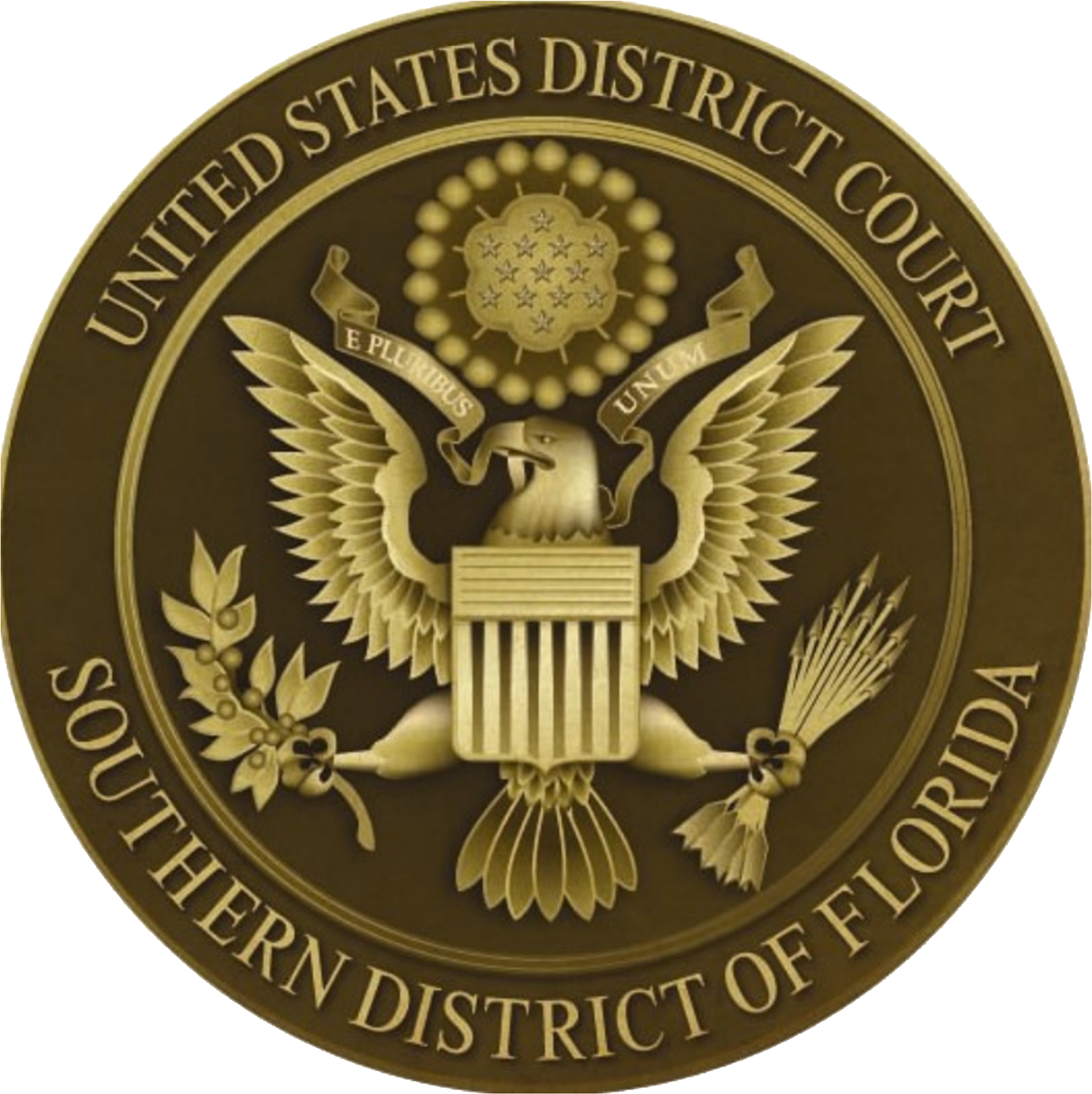
- Location: Wilkie D. Ferguson, Jr. U.S. Courthouse (Miami) More locations: C. Clyde Atkins U.S. Courthouse (Miami); James L. King Federal Justice Building (Miami); Fort Lauderdale; West Palm Beach; Fort Pierce; Sidney M. Aronovitz United States Courthouse (Key West)
- Appeals to: Eleventh Circuit
- Established: February 23, 1847
- Judges: 19
- Chief Judge: Cecilia Altonaga

Officers of the court
- U.S. Attorney: Yara Klukas (Acting)
- U.S. Marshal: Gadyaces S. Serralta
- www.flsd.uscourts.gov

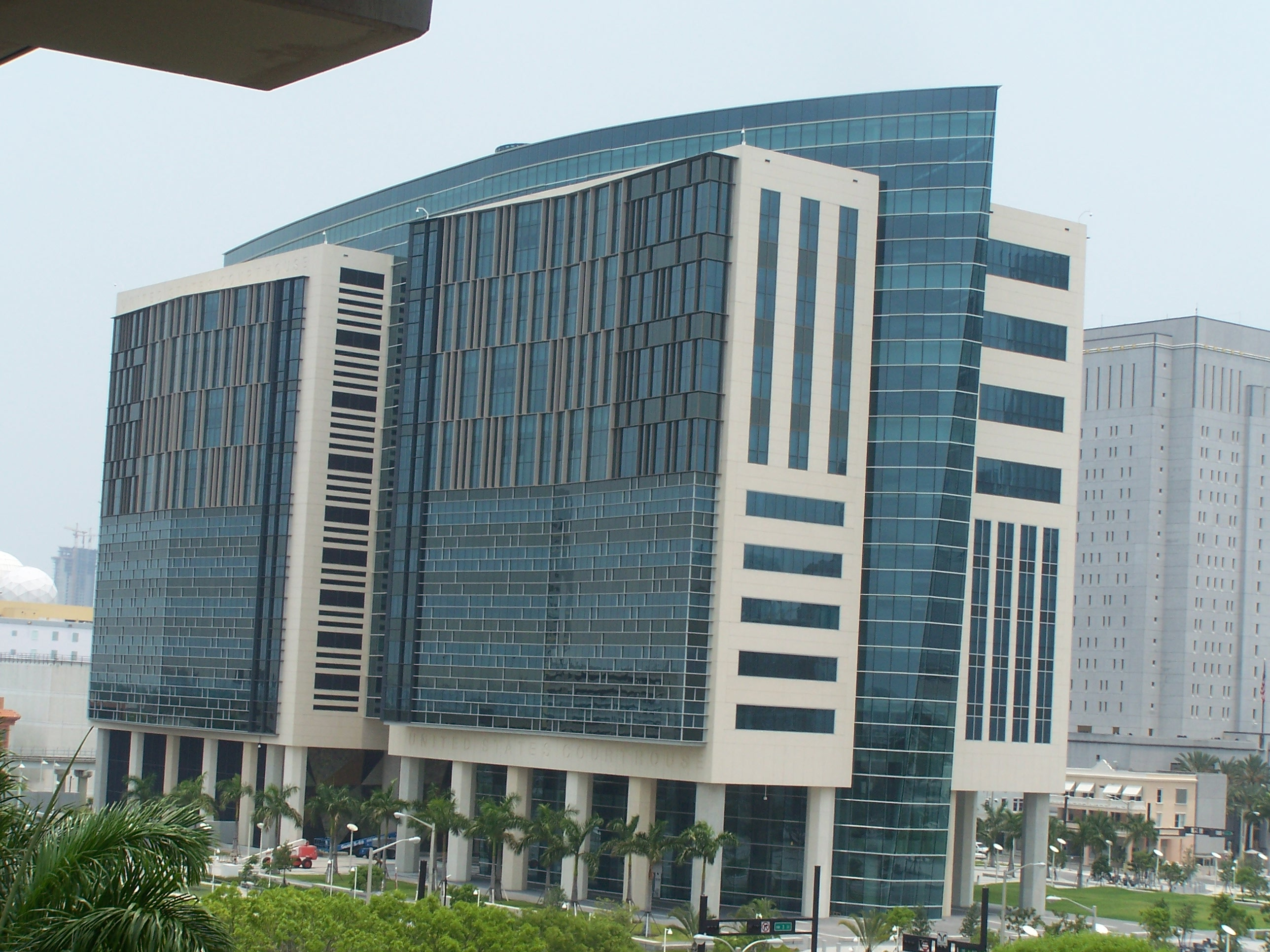
Wilkie D. Ferguson Jr. United States Courthouse in Miami in 2007

The United States District Court for the Southern District of Florida (in case citations, S.D. Fla. or S.D. Fl.) is the federal United States district court with territorial jurisdiction over the southern part of the state of Florida.

Appeals from cases brought in the Southern District of Florida are to the United States Court of Appeals for the Eleventh Circuit (except for patent claims and claims against the U.S. government under the Tucker Act, which are appealed to the Federal Circuit).

== History ==
=== 19th century ===
On the same day that Florida was admitted as a state, March 3, 1845, Congress enacted legislation creating the United States District Court for the District of Florida, 5 Stat. 788. On February 23, 1847, this District was subdivided into Northern and Southern Districts, by 9 Stat. 131. The statute effecting this division set forth the boundaries of the Districts:

[T]hat part of the State of Florida lying south of a line drawn due east and west from the northern point of Charlotte Harbor, including the islands, keys, reefs, shoals, harbors, bays and inlets, south of said line, shall be erected into a new judicial district, to be called the Southern District of Florida; a District Court shall be held in said Southern District, to consist of one judge, who shall reside at Key West, in said district...

=== 20th and 21st centuries ===
On July 30, 1962, the Middle District was created from portions of these districts by 76 Stat. 247.

This federal district has the dubious distinction of having had more judges removed through impeachment than any other district, with a total of two, one fourth of all federal judges so removed.

Famous cases heard in the district include the prosecution of former Panamanian military leader Manuel Noriega, the Elián González case, notorious Ponzi schemer Scott Rothstein, a 2000 United States presidential election recount in Florida case, the prosecution of José Padilla, and one of the federal prosecutions of Donald Trump.

== Jurisdiction ==
The court's jurisdiction comprises the nine counties of Broward, Highlands, Indian River, Martin, Miami-Dade, Monroe, Okeechobee, Palm Beach, and St. Lucie. The district includes the South Florida metropolitan area of Miami, Fort Lauderdale, and West Palm Beach. It comprises 15,197 square miles (39,360 km^{2}) and approximately 6.3 million people. Courthouses, corresponding to the five divisions of the district, are located in Fort Lauderdale, Fort Pierce, Key West, Miami, and West Palm Beach. The court's offices are located in Miami.

== United States attorney and marshal ==
The United States Attorney for the Southern District of Florida represents the United States in civil and criminal litigation in federal court. As of November 7, 2026, the United States Attorney is Yara Lorenzo Klukas.

The United States Attorney's office has a staff of approximately 233 assistant United States attorneys and 227 support personnel. The main office is located in Miami, Florida, with three staffed branch offices located in Fort Lauderdale, West Palm Beach and Fort Pierce and one unstaffed branch office located in Key West. There is also a High Intensity Drug Trafficking Area (HIDTA) office in West Miami-Dade and a Health Care Fraud Facility in Miramar.

On August 28, 2018, Gadyaces S. Serralta was confirmed by the United States Senate to be the United States marshal.

== Organization of the court ==
The United States District Court for the Southern District of Florida is one of three federal judicial districts in Florida. The District has five divisions:

Fort Pierce Division comprises the following counties: Highlands, Okeechobee, Indian River, St. Lucie, and Martin.

West Palm Beach Division comprises Palm Beach County.

Fort Lauderdale Division comprises Broward County.

Miami Division comprises Miami-Dade County.

Key West Division comprises Monroe County.

== Current judges ==
As of August 10, 2026:

#	Title	Judge	Duty station	Born	Term of service			Appointed by
#	Title	Judge	Duty station	Born	Active	Chief	Senior	Appointed by
58	Chief Judge	Cecilia Altonaga	Miami	1962	2003–present	2021–present	—	G.W. Bush
45	District Judge	K. Michael Moore	Miami	1951	1992–present	2014–2021	—	G.H.W. Bush
50	District Judge	Donald Middlebrooks	West Palm Beach	1946	1997–present	—	—	Clinton
52	District Judge	William Dimitrouleas	Ft. Lauderdale	1951	1998–present	—	—	Clinton
57	District Judge	Jose E. Martinez	Miami	1941	2002–present	—	—	G.W. Bush
61	District Judge	Kathleen M. Williams	Miami	1956	2011–present	—	—	Obama
64	District Judge	Darrin P. Gayles	Miami	1966	2014–present	—	—	Obama
65	District Judge	Beth Bloom	Miami	1962	2014–present	—	—	Obama
66	District Judge	Robin L. Rosenberg	West Palm Beach	1962	2014–present	—	—	Obama
67	District Judge	Roy Altman	Miami	1982	2019–present	—	—	Trump
68	District Judge	Rodolfo Ruiz	Miami	1979	2019–present	—	—	Trump
69	District Judge	Rodney Smith	Ft. Lauderdale	1974	2019–present	—	—	Trump
70	District Judge	Raag Singhal	Ft. Lauderdale	1963	2019–present	—	—	Trump
71	District Judge	Aileen Cannon	Ft. Pierce	1981	2020–present	—	—	Trump
72	District Judge	Jacqueline Becerra	Miami	1970	2024–present	—	—	Biden
73	District Judge	David S. Leibowitz	Miami	1971	2024–present	—	—	Biden
74	District Judge	Melissa Damian	Miami	1968	2024–present	—	—	Biden
75	District Judge	Ed Artau	West Palm Beach	1964	2025–present	—	—	Trump
76	District Judge	Jeffrey Kuntz	Ft. Lauderdale	1981	2026–present	—	—	Trump
31	Senior Judge	Jose Gonzalez Jr.	inactive	1931	1978–1996	—	1996–present	Carter
40	Senior Judge	William J. Zloch	inactive	1944	1985–2017	2000–2007	2017–present	Reagan
42	Senior Judge	Federico A. Moreno	Miami	1952	1990–2020	2007–2014	2020–present	G.H.W. Bush
43	Senior Judge	Donald L. Graham	Miami	1948	1991–2013	—	2013–present	G.H.W. Bush
48	Senior Judge	Daniel T. K. Hurley	inactive	1943	1994–2009	—	2009–present	Clinton
49	Senior Judge	Joan A. Lenard	Miami	1952	1995–2017	—	2017–present	Clinton
51	Senior Judge	Alan Stephen Gold	inactive	1944	1997–2010	—	2010–present	Clinton
53	Senior Judge	Patricia A. Seitz	inactive	1946	1998–2012	—	2012–present	Clinton
55	Senior Judge	Paul Huck	Miami	1940	2000–2010	—	2010–present	Clinton
56	Senior Judge	Kenneth Marra	West Palm Beach	1951	2002–2017	—	2017–present	G.W. Bush
59	Senior Judge	James I. Cohn	Ft. Lauderdale	1948	2003–2016	—	2016–present	G.W. Bush
62	Senior Judge	Robert N. Scola Jr.	inactive	1955	2011–2023	—	2023–present	Obama

== Former judges ==
#	Judge	Born–died	Active service	Chief Judge	Senior status	Appointed by	Reason for termination
1	William Marvin	1808–1902	1847–1863	—	—	Polk	resignation
2	Thomas Boynton	1838–1871	1863–1870 (Note: Recess appointment; formally nominated on January 5, 1864, confirmed by the United States Senate on January 20, 1864, and received commission the same day.)	—	—	Lincoln	resignation
3	John McKinney	1829–1871	1870–1871 (Note: Recess appointment; formally nominated on December 7, 1870, confirmed by the Senate on February 18, 1871, and received commission the same day.)	—	—	Grant	death
4	James William Locke	1837–1922	1872–1912	—	—	Grant	retirement
5	John Moses Cheney	1859–1922	1912–1913 (Note: Recess appointment; the Senate did not confirm the appointment.)	—	—	Taft	not confirmed
6	Rhydon Mays Call	1858–1927	1913–1927 (Note: Recess appointment; formally nominated on April 12, 1913, confirmed by the Senate on April 24, 1913, and received commission the same day.)	—	—	Wilson	death
7	Lake Jones	1867–1930	1924–1930	—	—	Coolidge	death
8	Alexander Akerman	1869–1948	1929–1939	—	1939–1948	Coolidge	death
9	Halsted L. Ritter	1868–1951	1929–1936	—	—	Coolidge	removal
10	Louie Willard Strum	1890–1954	1931–1950	1948–1950	—	Hoover	elevation
11	John W. Holland	1883–1969	1936–1955	1950–1955	1955–1969	F. Roosevelt	death
12	William J. Barker	1886–1968	1940–1959	1955–1959	1959–1968	F. Roosevelt	death
13	Curtis L. Waller	1887–1950	1940–1943 (Note: Jointly appointed to the Northern and Southern Districts of Florida.)	—	—	F. Roosevelt	elevation
14	Dozier A. DeVane	1883–1963	1943–1958 (Note: From 1943-1947, Judge DeVane was jointly appointed to the Northern and Southern Districts of Florida.)	—	1958–1963	F. Roosevelt	death
15	George Whitehurst	1891–1974	1950–1961	1959–1961	1961–1974	Truman	death
16	John Simpson	1903–1987	1950–1962	1961–1962	—	Truman	reassignment
17	Emett Clay Choate	1891–1974	1954–1965	—	1965–1974	Eisenhower	death
18	Joseph Patrick Lieb	1901–1971	1955–1962 (Note: Recess appointment; formally nominated on January 12, 1956, confirmed by the Senate on March 1, 1956, and received commission the same day.)	—	—	Eisenhower	reassignment
18	William McRae	1909–1973	1961–1962	—	—	Kennedy	reassignment
19	David W. Dyer	1910–1998	1961–1966	1962–1966	—	Kennedy	elevation
20	George C. Young	1916–2015	1961–1966 (Note: From 1961-1962, Judge Young was jointly appointed to the Northern and Southern Districts of Florida. From 1962-1966, Judge Young was jointly appointed to the Middle, Northern, and Southern Districts of Florida.)	—	—	Kennedy	reassignment
21	Charles B. Fulton	1910–1996	1963–1978	1966–1977	1978–1996	Kennedy	death
22	William O. Mehrtens	1905–1980	1965–1975	—	1975–1980	L. Johnson	death
23	C. Clyde Atkins	1914–1999	1966–1982	1977–1982	1982–1999	L. Johnson	death
24	Ted Cabot	1917–1971	1966–1971	—	—	L. Johnson	death
25	Joe Oscar Eaton	1920–2008	1967–1985	1982–1984	1985–2008	L. Johnson	death
26	Peter T. Fay	1929–2021	1970–1976	—	—	Nixon	elevation
27	James Lawrence King	1927–2026	1970–1992	1984–1991	1992–2026	Nixon	death
28	Norman Roettger Jr.	1930–2003	1972–1997	1991–1997	1997–2003	Nixon	death
29	Sidney Aronovitz	1920–1997	1976–1988	—	1988–1997	Ford	death
30	William Hoeveler	1922–2017	1977–1991	—	1991–2017	Carter	death
32	Edward B. Davis	1933–2010	1979–2000	1997–2000	—	Carter	retirement
33	James W. Kehoe	1925–1998	1979–1992	—	1992–1998	Carter	death
34	James Carriger Paine	1924–2010	1979–1992	—	1992–2010	Carter	death
35	Eugene P. Spellman	1930–1991	1979–1991	—	—	Carter	death
36	Alcee Hastings	1936–2021	1979–1989	—	—	Carter	removal
37	Lenore Carrero Nesbitt	1932–2001	1983–1998	—	1998–2001	Reagan	death
38	Stanley Marcus	1946–present	1985–1997	—	—	Reagan	elevation
39	Thomas Scott	1948–present	1985–1990	—	—	Reagan	resignation
41	Kenneth Ryskamp	1932–2017	1986–2000	—	2000–2017	Reagan	death
44	Shelby Highsmith	1929–2015	1991–2002	—	2002–2015	G.H.W. Bush	death
46	Ursula Mancusi Ungaro	1951–present	1992–2021	—	2021	G.H.W. Bush	retirement
47	Wilkie D. Ferguson	1938–2003	1993–2003	—	—	Clinton	death
54	Adalberto Jordan	1961–present	1999–2012	—	—	Clinton	elevation
60	Marcia G. Cooke	1954–2023	2004–2022	—	2022–2023	G.W. Bush	death
63	Robin S. Rosenbaum	1966–present	2012–2014	—	—	Obama	elevation

== Chief judges ==
Chief judges have administrative responsibilities with respect to their district court. Unlike the Supreme Court, where one justice is specifically nominated to be chief, the office of chief judge rotates among the district court judges. To be chief, a judge must have been in active service on the court for at least one year, be under the age of 65, and have not previously served as chief judge.

A vacancy is filled by the judge highest in seniority among the group of qualified judges. The chief judge serves for a term of seven years, or until age 70, whichever occurs first. The age restrictions are waived if no members of the court would otherwise be qualified for the position.

When the office was created in 1948, the chief judge was the longest-serving judge who had not elected to retire, on what has since 1958 been known as senior status, or declined to serve as chief judge. After August 6, 1959, judges could not become or remain chief after turning 70 years old. The current rules have been in operation since October 1, 1982.

== Succession of seats ==
Seat 1
Seat established on February 23, 1847 by 9 Stat. 131
Marvin	1847–1863
Boynton	1864–1870
McKinney	1870–1871
Locke	1872–1912
Cheney	1912–1913
Call	1913–1927
Ritter	1929–1936
Holland	1936–1955
Lieb	1955–1962
Seat reassigned to the Middle District of Florida on October 29, 1962 by 76 Stat. 247

Seat 2
Seat established on September 14, 1922 by 42 Stat. 837 (temporary)
Jones	1924–1930
Seat abolished on June 7, 1930 (temporary judgeship expired)

Seat 3
Seat established on January 17, 1929 by 45 Stat. 1081
Akerman	1929–1939
Barker	1940–1959
McRae, Jr.	1961–1962
Seat reassigned to the Middle District of Florida on October 29, 1962 by 76 Stat. 247

Seat 4
Seat established on June 27, 1930 by 46 Stat. 820
Strum	1931–1950
Simpson	1950–1962
Seat reassigned to the Middle District of Florida on October 29, 1962 by 76 Stat. 247

Seat 5
Seat established on May 24, 1940 by 54 Stat. 219 (temporary, concurrent with Northern District)
Waller	1940–1943
DeVane	1943–1947
Seat reassigned solely to Northern District and made permanent on October 1, 1947 pursuant to 54 Stat. 219

Seat 6
Seat established on August 3, 1949 by 63 Stat. 493 (concurrent with Northern District)
Whitehurst	1950–1961
Seat assigned concurrently to the Middle District on July 30, 1962 pursuant to 76 Stat. 247
Young	1961–1966
Seat reassigned solely to the Middle District on September 17, 1966 pursuant to 80 Stat. 75

Seat 7
Seat established on February 10, 1954 by 68 Stat. 8
Choate	1954–1965
Mehrtens	1965–1975
Aronovitz	1976–1988
Graham	1991–2013
Bloom	2014–present

Seat 8
Seat established on May 19, 1961 by 75 Stat. 80
Dyer	1961–1966
Eaton	1967–1985
Ryskamp	1986–2000
Huck	2000–2010
Scola, Jr.	2011–2023
Artau	2025–present

Seat 9
Seat established on May 19, 1961 by 75 Stat. 80
Fulton	1963–1978
Gonzalez, Jr.	1978–1996
Gold	1997–2011
Rosenbaum	2012–2014
Smith	2019–present

Seat 10
Seat established on March 18, 1966 by 80 Stat. 75
Atkins	1966–1982
Nesbitt	1983–1998
Jordan	1999–2012
Rosenberg	2014–present

Seat 11
Seat established on March 18, 1966 by 80 Stat. 75
Cabot	1966–1971
Roettger, Jr.	1972–1997
Dimitrouleas	1998–present

Seat 12
Seat established on June 2, 1970 by 84 Stat. 294
Fay	1970–1976
Hoeveler	1977–1991
Ferguson, Jr.	1993–2003
Cooke	2004–2022
Becerra	2024–present

Seat 13
Seat established on June 2, 1970 by 84 Stat. 294
King	1970–1992
Lenard	1995–2017
Altman	2019–present

Seat 14
Seat established on October 20, 1978 by 92 Stat. 1629
Paine	1979–1992
Hurley	1994–2009
Williams	2011–present

Seat 15
Seat established on October 20, 1978 by 92 Stat. 1629
Kehoe	1979–1992
Middlebrooks	1997–present

Seat 16
Seat established on October 20, 1978 by 92 Stat. 1629
Spellman	1979–1991
Moore	1992–present

Seat 17
Seat established on October 20, 1978 by 92 Stat. 1629
Davis	1979–2000
Martinez	2002–present

Seat 18
Seat established on October 20, 1978 by 92 Stat. 1629
Hastings	1979–1989
Moreno	1990–2020
Leibowitz	2024–present

Seat 19
Seat established on July 10, 1984 by 98 Stat. 333
Marcus	1985–1997
Seitz	1998–2012
Gayles	2014–present

Seat 20
Seat established on July 10, 1984 by 98 Stat. 333
Scott, Jr.	1985–1990
Highsmith	1991–2002
Altonaga	2003–present

Seat 21
Seat established on July 10, 1984 by 98 Stat. 333
Zloch	1985–2017
Ruiz	2019–present

Seat 22
Seat established on December 1, 1990 by 104 Stat. 5089
Ungaro	1992–2021
Damian	2024–present

Seat 23
Seat established on December 21, 2000 by 114 Stat. 2762
Marra	2002–2017
Cannon	2020–present

Seat 24
Seat established on November 2, 2002 by 116 Stat. 1758 (temporary)
Cohn	2003–2016
Seat made permanent on December 23, 2024 by 138 Stat. 2693
Singhal	2019–present

Seat 25
Seat established on August 1, 2025 pursuant to 104 Stat. 5089 (temporary)
Kuntz	2026–present

== United States attorneys ==
List of U.S. attorneys since 1828

- William Allison McRea (1828–1829)
- John G. Stower (1829–1830)
- John K. Campbell (1830–1831)
- Edward Chandler (1831–1834)
- Adam Gordon (1834)
- Wylie P. Clark (1834–1839)
- Charles Walker (1839–1840)
- L. Windsor Smith (1840–1842)
- George W. McRae (1842–1847)
- L. Windsor Smith (1847–1850)
- William R. Hackley (1850–1858)
- John L. Tatum (1858–1861)
- Thomas J. Boynton (1861–1863)
- Homer G. Plantz (1863–1869)
- Claiborn R. Mobley (1869–1876)
- John Tyler Jr. (1876–1877)
- George B. Patterson (1877–1886)
- Livingstone W. Bethel (1886–1890)
- George B. Patterson (1890–1894)
- Owen J. H. Summers (1894)
- Frank Clark (1894–1897)
- Joseph N. Stripling (1897–1902)
- John Moses Cheney (1902–1912)
- Richard P. Marks (1912–1913)
- Herbert S. Phillips (1913–1921)
- William M. Gober (1921–1929)
- Wilburn P. Hughes (1929–1933)
- John W. Holland (1933–1936)
- Herbert S. Phillips (1936–1953)
- James L. Guilmartin (1953–1959)
- E. Coleman Madsen (1959–1961)
- Edward G. Boardman (1961–1963)
- William A. Meadows Jr. (1963–1969)
- Robert W. Rust (1969–1977)
- Vincent K. Antle (1977)
- Jacob V. Eskenazi (1977–1980)
- Atlee W. Wampler III (1980–1982)
- Stanley Marcus (1982–1985)
- Leon B. Kellner (1985–1988)
- Dexter Lehtinen (1988–1992)
- James McAdams (1992)
- Roberto Martinez (1992–1993)
- Kendall B. Coffey (1993–1996)
- William Keefer (1996–1997)
- Thomas Scott (1997–2000)
- Guy A. Lewis (2000–2002)
- Marcos Jiménez (2002–2005)
- Alexander Acosta (2005–2009)
- Jeffrey H. Sloman (2009–2010)
- Wifredo A. Ferrer (2010–2017)
- Benjamin G. Greenberg (2017–2018)
- Ariana Fajardo Orshan (2018–2021)
- Juan Antonio Gonzalez (acting) (2021–2023)
- Markenzy Lapointe (2023–2025)
- Jason Reding Quiñones (2025-2026)
- Yara Klukas (acting) (2026–)

== See also ==
- Courts of Florida
- List of current United States district judges
- List of United States federal courthouses in Florida
- United States Court of Appeals for the Eleventh Circuit
- United States District Court for the Middle District of Florida
- United States District Court for the Northern District of Florida
- United States attorneys for federal judicial districts of Florida Territory
