= John McKinney (Florida judge) =

American judge

Judge of the United States District Court for the Southern District of Florida
- In office November 8, 1870 – October 12, 1871
- Appointed by: Ulysses S. Grant
- Preceded by: Thomas Jefferson Boynton
- Succeeded by: James William Locke

Personal details
- Born: John McKinney; 1829 Lycoming County, Pennsylvania
- Died: October 12, 1871 (aged 41–42)
- Education: Princeton University (A.B.) read law

John McKinney (1829 – October 12, 1871) was a United States district judge of the United States District Court for the Southern District of Florida.

== Education and career ==
Born in Lycoming County, Pennsylvania, McKinney graduated from the College of New Jersey (now Princeton University) with an Artium Baccalaureus degree in 1848. He read law in 1850. He served as a clerk in the Solicitor's Office of the United States Department of the Treasury in Washington, D.C., beginning in 1861.

== Federal judicial service ==
McKinney received a recess appointment from President Ulysses S. Grant on November 8, 1870, to a seat on the United States District Court for the Southern District of Florida vacated by Judge Thomas Jefferson Boynton. He was nominated to the same position by President Grant on December 7, 1870. He was confirmed by the United States Senate on February 18, 1871, and received his commission the same day. His service terminated on October 12, 1871, due to his death.

== Sources ==
Legal offices
Preceded by Thomas Jefferson Boynton	Judge of the United States District Court for the Southern District of Florida; 1870–1871	Succeeded by James William Locke
