= William J. Zloch =

American judge (born 1944)

Senior Judge of the United States District Court for the Southern District of Florida
- Incumbent
- Assumed office January 31, 2017

Chief Judge of the United States District Court for the Southern District of Florida
- In office July 1, 2000 – June 30, 2007
- Preceded by: Edward B. Davis
- Succeeded by: Federico A. Moreno

Judge of the United States District Court for the Southern District of Florida
- In office November 4, 1985 – January 31, 2017
- Appointed by: Ronald Reagan
- Preceded by: Seat established by 98 Stat. 333
- Succeeded by: Rodolfo Ruiz

Personal details
- Born: September 16, 1944 (age 82) Fort Lauderdale, Florida, U.S.
- Education: University of Notre Dame (BA, JD)

William J. Zloch (born September 16, 1944) is a senior United States district judge of the United States District Court for the Southern District of Florida, as well as a former American football quarterback and wide receiver for the University of Notre Dame.

== College football ==
Following the departure of Heisman Trophy winner John Huarte in 1965, Notre Dame football coach Ara Parseghian was faced with a wide-open competition for the quarterback position. He opted to move senior Bill Zloch from wide receiver to quarterback for the 1965 season. Directing a team that was heavily run-oriented, Zloch finished the season completing 36 of 88 passes for 558 yards and three touchdowns. The team finished 7-2-1 and ranked 8th nationally.

== Education and career ==
Zloch graduated from the University of Notre Dame with a Bachelor of Arts degree in 1966. After graduation, he spent three years in the United States Navy, achieving the rank of lieutenant and played football for the Pensacola Navy Goshawks with Roger Staubach. He then returned to Notre Dame Law School, completing a Juris Doctor in 1974. He returned to Fort Lauderdale, Florida where he practiced law from 1974 to 1985.

=== Federal judicial service ===
On October 9, 1985, President Ronald Reagan nominated Zloch to a new seat on the United States District Court for the Southern District of Florida created by 98 Stat. 333. He was confirmed by the United States Senate on November 1, 1985, and received his commission on November 4, 1985. On July 1, 2000, he began a seven-year term as chief judge of the district, ending on June 30, 2007. He was succeeded as chief judge by Judge Federico A. Moreno. He assumed senior status on January 31, 2017. As of April 29, 2026, Zloch appears to be inactive.

== Notable case ==
On August 21, 2009, Judge Zloch sentenced UBS whistleblower Bradley Birkenfeld to 40 months in prison with 3 years probation and a $30,000 fine, a term that was harsher than the prosecutors wanted. "Assistant U.S. attorney Jeffrey A. Neiman recommended that Birkenfeld get 30 months in prison for his conviction on one count of conspiracy to defraud the government—down from the 60-month maximum sentence he is exposed to—because of his extensive cooperation," the Miami Herald reported.

On August 25, 2017, Federal Judge William Zloch, dismissed the class-action lawsuit the DNC rigged primary elections against presidential candidate Bernie Sanders after several months of litigation during which DNC attorneys argued that the DNC would be well within their rights to select their own candidate. “In evaluating Plaintiffs’ claims at this stage, the Court assumes their allegations are true—that the DNC and Wasserman Schultz held a palpable bias in favor Clinton and sought to propel her ahead of her Democratic opponent,” "The Observer" reported.

== See also ==
- List of United States federal judges by longevity of service

== Sources ==
Legal offices
Preceded by Seat established by 98 Stat. 333	Judge of the United States District Court for the Southern District of Florida; 1985–2017	Succeeded by Rodolfo Ruiz
Preceded by Edward B. Davis	Chief Judge of the United States District Court for the Southern District of Florida; 2000–2007	Succeeded by Federico A. Moreno
