= Thomas Jefferson Boynton =

American judge (1838–1871)

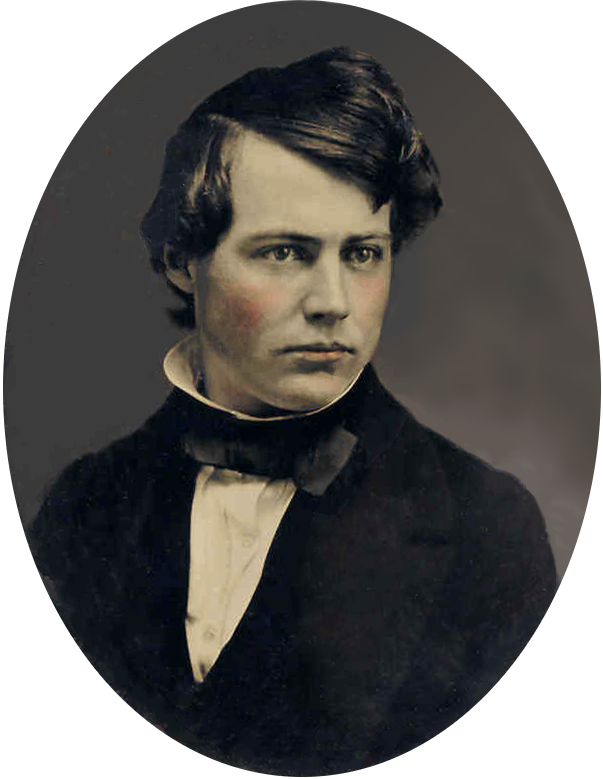

Judge of the United States District Court for the Southern District of Florida
- In office October 19, 1863 – January 1, 1870
- Appointed by: Abraham Lincoln
- Preceded by: William Marvin
- Succeeded by: John McKinney

Personal details
- Born: Thomas Jefferson Boynton; August 31, 1838 Amherst, Ohio
- Died: May 2, 1871 (aged 32) New York City, New York
- Education: read law

Thomas Jefferson Boynton (August 31, 1838 – May 2, 1871) was a United States district judge of the United States District Court for the Southern District of Florida.

== Education and career ==
Born on August 31, 1838, in Amherst, Ohio, Boynton read law in 1858. He entered private practice in St. Joseph, Missouri from 1858 to 1861. He was a correspondent for the Missouri Democrat from 1858 to 1861. He was a newspaper editor in Jefferson City, Missouri. He was the United States Attorney for the Southern District of Florida from 1861 to 1863.

== Federal judicial service ==
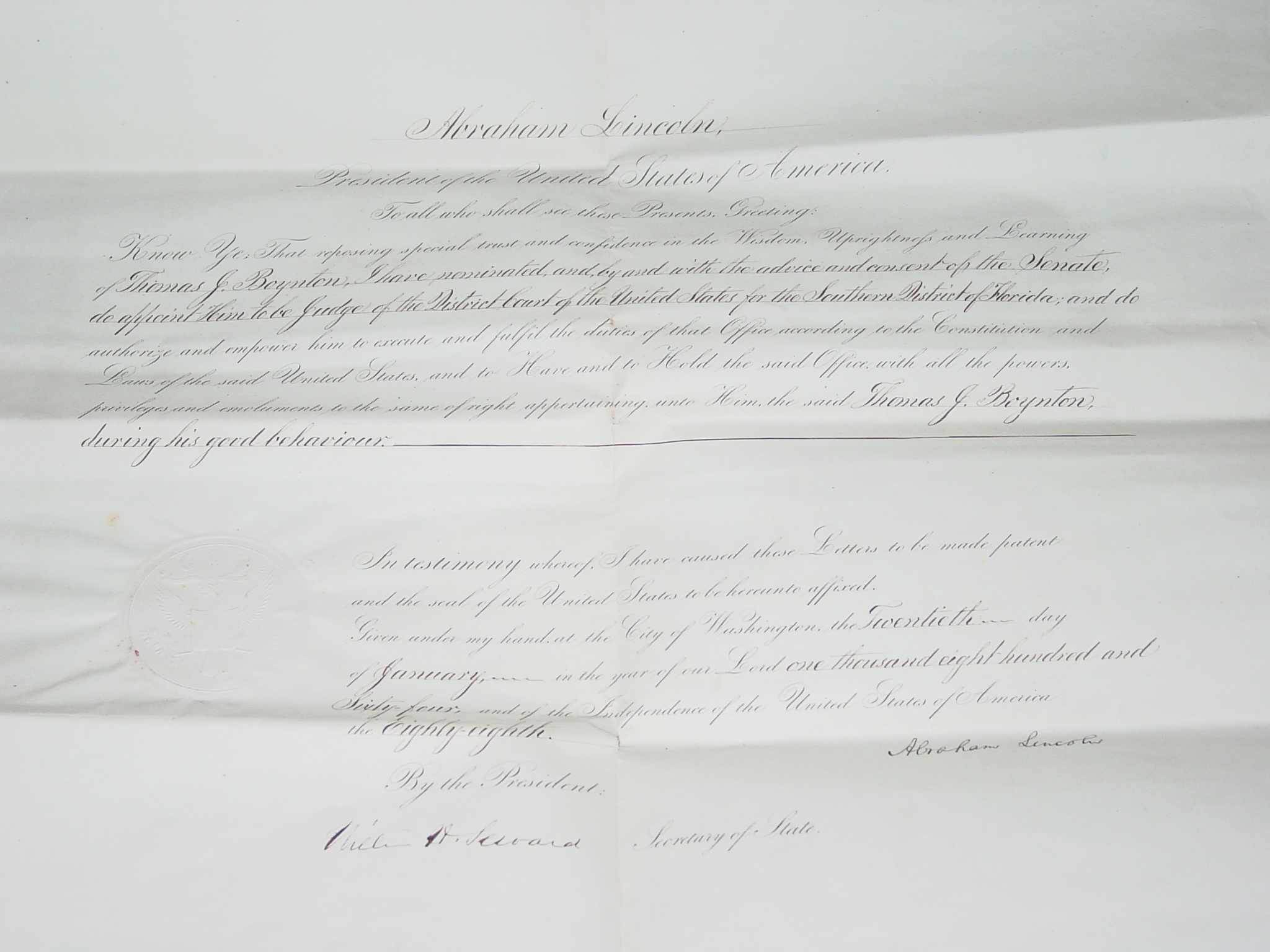
Appointment of Judge Boynton signed by Seward and Lincoln

Boynton received a recess appointment from President Abraham Lincoln on October 19, 1863, to a seat on the United States District Court for the Southern District of Florida vacated by Judge William Marvin. He was nominated to the same position by President Lincoln on January 5, 1864. He was confirmed by the United States Senate on January 20, 1864, and received his commission the same day. His service terminated on January 1, 1870, due to his resignation.

== Death ==
Boynton died on May 2, 1871, in New York City, New York.

== Sources ==
Legal offices
Preceded by William Marvin	Judge of the United States District Court for the Southern District of Florida; 1863–1870	Succeeded by John McKinney
