= List of United States attorneys for the Southern District of Florida =

The office of United States Attorney for the Southern District of Florida came into being with the creation of the United States District Court for the Southern District of Florida in 1847, and continues to the present day.

- William Allison McRea 1828–29
- John G. Stower 1829–30
- John K. Campbell 1830–31
- Edward Chandler 1831–34
- Adam Gordon 1834
- Wylie P. Clark 1834–39
- William Marvin 1835–39
- Charles Walker 1839–40
- L. Windsor Smith 1840–42
- George W. McRae 1842–47
- L. Windsor Smith 1847–50
- William R. Hackley 1850–58
- John L. Tatum 1858–61
- Thomas J. Boynton 1861–63
- Homer G. Plantz 1863–69
- Claiborn R. Mobley 1869–76
- John Tyler, Jr. 1876–77
- George B. Patterson 1877–86
- Livingstone W. Bethel 1886–90
- George B. Patterson 1890–94
- Owen J. H. Summers 1894
- Frank Clark 1894–97
- Joseph N. Stripling 1897–1902
- John M. Cheney 1902–12
- Richard P. Marks 1912–13
- Herbert S. Phillips 1913–21
- William M. Gober 1921–29
- Wilburn P. Hughes 1929–33
- John W. Holland 1933–36
- Herbert S. Phillips 1936–53
- James L. Guilmartin 1953–59
- E. Coleman Madsen 1959–61
- Edward G. Boardman 1961–63
- William A. Meadows, Jr. 1963–69
- Robert W. Rust 1969–77
- Vincent K. Antle 1977
- Jacob V. Eskenazi 1977–80
- Atlee W. Wampler III 1980–82
- Stanley Marcus 1982–85
- Leon B. Kellner 1985–88
- Dexter W. Lehtinen 1988–92
- James McAdams 1992
- Roberto Martinez 1992–93
- Kendall B. Coffey 1993–96
- William Keefer 1996–97
- Thomas E. Scott 1997–2000
- Guy A. Lewis 2000?–2002
- Marcos Daniel Jimenez 2002–2005
- Alexander Acosta 2005–2009
- Wifredo A. Ferrer 2010–2017
- Benjamin Gerald Greenberg 2018
- Ariana Fajardo Orshan 2018–2021
- Juan Gonzalez 2021–2023
- Markenzy Lapointe 2023–2025
- Hayden P. O'Bryne 2025
- Jason Reding Quiñones 2025–2026
- Yara Lorenzo Klukas 2026–Present
