= Mary Beth Buchanan =

American lawyer

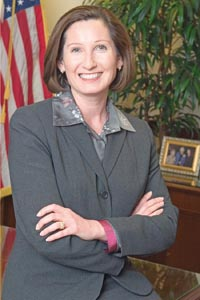
- Official Justice Department photo

Acting Director of the Office on Violence Against Women
- In office November 2006 – December 2007
- President: George W. Bush
- Preceded by: Diane Stuart
- Succeeded by: Cindy Dyer

Director of the Executive Office for United States Attorneys
- In office June 2004 – June 2005
- President: George W. Bush
- Preceded by: Guy A. Lewis
- Succeeded by: Michael A. Battle

United States Attorney for the Western District of Pennsylvania
- In office September 14, 2001 – November 16, 2009
- President: George W. Bush; Barack Obama
- Preceded by: Fred Thieman
- Succeeded by: Robert S. Cessar

Personal details
- Born: Roscoe, Pennsylvania, U.S.
- Party: Republican
- Spouse: Thomas C. Buchanan
- Education: California University of Pennsylvania (BA); University of Pittsburgh (JD)
- Profession: Politician U.S. Attorney

Mary Beth Buchanan (née Kotcella) is the former United States Attorney for the Western District of Pennsylvania. She was nominated by George W. Bush on September 5, 2001, and confirmed by the United States Senate on September 14, 2001.

Buchanan was the first woman and youngest person to be appointed to the position. Under Attorneys General John Ashcroft and Alberto Gonzales, Buchanan held two key Justice Department posts, splitting time between Washington, D.C., and Pittsburgh up until her resignation as Acting Director of the Department of Justice's Office on Violence Against Women in December 2007. In May 2010, Buchanan was a candidate for the United States House of Representatives for Pennsylvania's 4th congressional district, but was defeated in the Republican primary.

== Personal ==
Buchanan was born in July 25, 1963, and is a native of suburban Roscoe, Pennsylvania. She is a 1984 graduate of California University of Pennsylvania, and a 1987 graduate of the University of Pittsburgh School of Law. Her second husband, Thomas C. Buchanan, is the grandson of the founder of the Buchanan Ingersoll law firm. The firm, in which he is a partner, is now called Buchanan, Ingersoll & Rooney.

== Career ==
Buchanan worked temporarily as an associate at Strassburger McKenna Gutnick & Potter after her 1987 law school graduation.

Buchanan is an active member of the Federalist Society. She has spoken at many of the organization's conferences on various topics and has published two articles in the society's news magazine. Buchanan was slated to speak on "Warrantless Wiretapping, Wireless Tracking, and Law Enforcement" at the Boston University Student Chapter of the Federalist Society on January 28, 2009.

=== Federal appointments ===
Buchanan joined the U.S. Attorney's Office as an Assistant U.S. Attorney in 1988. From 1988 to 1992, she represented the United States in the office's Civil Division. From 1992 until her appointment as U.S. Attorney, she served in the Criminal Division.

Buchanan was the United States Attorney for the Western District of Pennsylvania from 2001 to 2009. She was nominated by George W. Bush on September 5, 2001, and confirmed by the United States Senate on September 14, 2001. On December 3, 2008, Buchanan released a statement to the press that she did not intend to step down or offer her letter of resignation to President-elect Barack Obama despite the ordinary practice that sitting U.S. Attorneys offer a new administration their resignations. As an appointed position, U.S. Attorneys serve at the pleasure of the President. On October 29, 2009, Buchanan's office released a statement that she would step down from her post as U.S. Attorney for the Western District of Pennsylvania on November 16, 2009.

Buchanan concurrently served in more than one position within the Department of Justice. These appointments were as follows:

Between April 2003 and May 2004, Buchanan served as chair of Attorney General John Ashcroft's Advisory Committee of United States Attorneys. This committee counsels the Attorney General on law enforcement issues and plays an integral role in setting Justice Department policy.

From February 2002 to 2004, she served on the Advisory Committee to the United States Sentencing Commission, which was established to study the effectiveness of the Federal Sentencing Guidelines.

From June 2004 until June 2005, Buchanan served as Director of the Executive Office for United States Attorneys. This Washington, D.C.-based office provides administrative support to the 94 United States Attorneys' Offices nationwide. Buchanan held this post at the start of the period that relates to the Dismissal of U.S. attorneys controversy. Buchanan hired Monica Goodling to work in the executive office.

From November 2006 through December 2007, Buchanan served as the Acting Director of the Department of Justice's Office on Violence Against Women. This office, based in Washington, DC, administers financial and technical assistance to communities nationwide that are creating programs, policies, and practices aimed at ending domestic violence, dating violence, sexual assault, and stalking, and provides leadership in developing the nation's capacity to reduce violence against women through implementation of the Violence Against Women Act.

== Controversial cases ==
=== United States vs. Tommy Chong (2003) ===
Buchanan oversaw Operation Pipe Dreams, which was a $12 million law enforcement operation targeted at individuals conducting online sales of water pipes and other devices that could be considered drug paraphernalia. The investigation resulted in 55 individuals being charged, most notably comedian and actor Tommy Chong, who was charged for his role in the financing and promoting of Chong Glass/Nice Dreams, a company started by his son, Paris Chong. Chong's case never went through a federal trial; instead he came to a settlement with Buchanan's office in which he admitted to distributing 7,500 bongs and water pipes via the Internet through Nice Dreams, a family company named for one of his movies. Of the 55 individuals charged through the investigation, Tommy Chong was the only individual without a prior criminal history who received jail time.

Chong's jail time, the tactics utilized by the DEA agents during the investigation, and the investigation's focus on Tommy rather than Paris Chong (the company's CEO), raised concern among critics of selective prosecution. When asked why the government had focused on Tommy Chong instead of the company's CEO, Paris, Buchanan responded that "Tommy Chong was the more responsible corporate officer because he financed and marketed the product." When questioned on the disparity between sentences/fines that the other 54 individuals received compared to Tommy Chong, Buchanan stated, "He [Tommy Chong] wasn't the biggest supplier. He was a relatively new player, but he had the ability to market products like no other."

Chong was released from federal prison after nine months. He has been an avid critic of the prosecution in his case. In 2006, Chong wrote a book about his experiences in jail and his interest in meditation, called The I Chong: Meditations From The Joint. In addition, the documentary a/k/a Tommy Chong chronicles the Drug Enforcement Administration raid on his house and his subsequent jail sentence for trafficking in illegal drug paraphernalia. Tommy Chong has stated publicly that he has no ownership in the film.

On May 7, 2008, federal agents raided Spectrum Labs on an investigation related to Spectrum Labs' detoxification products. The raid, one of nine during the day, was part of Operation True Test, an investigation being led by Buchanan. The investigation targeted companies that sell "masking products" that are supposed to help drug-users pass employer drug tests. Of the nine search warrants issued, none were for businesses within Buchanan's district, the Western District of Pennsylvania.

In executing their search warrant, the federal agents supposedly seized over 10,000 copies of the documentary a/k/a Tommy Chong, which had yet to be released, though this was later retracted. Chong speculated that the initially alleged seizure may rest with prohibitions against one benefiting financially from a crime; however, Chong has not stated publicly that he has been charged with such an offense. In a statement released to the press, he stated "It's [i.e., the seizure of the DVDs] a way to punish the distributor financially. There's no way to get the DVDs back until the investigation is over." Chong also stated that he has no ownership in the film.

=== United States vs. Karen Fletcher (2006) ===
Karen Fletcher of suburban Donora, Pennsylvania was indicted on six charges of distributing obscene materials over the Internet. The fictional texts featured detailed stories about the molesting, torture and sometimes gruesome murders of children under the age of 10, mostly girls.

Unlike typical obscenity cases, though, Karen Fletcher was charged with violating the law through simple writing, and not with pictures or movies. Fletcher ran what was known as the "Red Rose" Web site, where she posted her fictional stories. In order to prevent minors and others from accessing the site improperly, Fletcher charged members a $10 monthly fee to have access to the site. At the time of the indictment, there were only 29 members to the site. No other member to the site was charged within the indictment.

In affidavits, Fletcher wrote that she has almost no memory of her childhood up until the age of 14. She explained that her writing started out just for her and was cathartic because she had been sexually abused as a child. "At first I would capture a particular feeling of dread and try to weave it into a scenario that explained the feeling", she wrote. Fletcher described what she called her "monsters":

I have always been afraid of monsters. The monsters in my life had always been real; for too long they were always there with unlimited access to me, and I was helpless to do anything about it. In my stories, I have created new monsters. [They] rise above the horror of the real life monsters. Somehow, making these monsters so much worse makes me feel better, and makes my life seem more bearable. I may still be afraid of the monsters, but at least in the stories, they prey on someone else, not me.

Fletcher's lawyers argued in pretrial court proceedings that their client was not guilty of the charges. Their arguments were based on a viewpoint that the stories written by Fletcher did not meet the legal definition of obscenity. The legal definition of obscenity embraces both "description", as in text, and "depiction", as in images, stated one of Fletcher's lawyers. In one of their briefs, the defense argued that Fletcher's stories, however lurid, were comparable to many scenes found in literature and television. The novel A Clockwork Orange, by Anthony Burgess, and episodes of the television cartoon South Park were cited as such examples. The defense also cited a scene in the novel The Apprentice by I. Lewis Libby Jr., the former chief of staff to Vice President Dick Cheney, in which a 10-year-old girl is placed in a cage with a bear who forces himself upon her sexually to habituate her to sexual submission. The lawyers argued that Fletcher's stories were no more lurid than the novel by Mr. Libby. Additionally, Fletcher's lawyers argued that she ran the web site for cathartic (medical) reasons in an attempt to help herself and others move past issues of childhood exploitation. The fact that Fletcher charged a membership fee was utilized to argue that Fletcher was not attempting to distribute the materials. Since the case was one of the handful of obscenity cases in the previous twenty years and it involved only text without visual images, First Amendment activists joined in the defense.

In response to the criticism that she received from those activists, Buchanan stated, "It (Fletcher's stories) is some of the most disturbing, disgusting and vile material that I've ever viewed." Later within another press statement, Buchanan stated that, "Obscene material is not protected by the First Amendment, and the law is clear on that." "This is extremely egregious and is as patently offensive as material possibly could be. I cannot imagine material more offensive than the material in the case of Karen Fletcher."

While pornography by itself is not illegal, it can be prosecuted as obscenity if it fits the definition laid out by the Supreme Court more than 30 years ago. Under that ruling, Miller v. California, a work may be deemed obscene if, taken as a whole, it lacks artistic, literary or scientific merit, depicts certain conduct in a patently offensive manner, and violates contemporary community standards. This standard was the one that was to determine the jury's calculus of guilt in the case of US vs. Karen Fletcher.

In the end, the case did not go to trial. Fletcher, a recluse living on disability payments, opted to accept a plea bargain. One of her lawyers, Lawrence Walters, stated that his client, who has agoraphobia, a fear of public places, is not capable of sitting through what likely would be a week-long trial. Under the proposed plea agreement, Fletcher would avoid prison and be sentenced to a term of home detention. In the view of some legal scholars, Fletcher's guilty plea will not set any precedent related to text-only obscenity prosecutions because she is entering the plea voluntarily.

On August 7, 2008, Karen Fletcher was sentenced to five years of probation, including six months of home detention, and forfeiture of her computer after pleading guilty to obscenity charges for running a Web site that featured fictional text stories that were sexual and violent in nature.

=== Daniel Zehr (2004) ===
The case focuses on an Amish man, Daniel Zehr, who is seeking an exception to a law which requires that a photo be taken for one to receive legal residence in the United States. A lawsuit filed by the Amish is highly unusual in nature since the Amish hold a steadfast view that they should be non-confrontational. The lawsuit relates to a first amendment argument centered on freedom of religion. Zehr is a Canadian citizen. He is a member of an Old Order Amish sect that takes literally the Bible's prohibition of graven images, which is why he has refused to consent to an immigration photo.

In June 2001, Zehr entered the United States and married his wife, Ruth Anne. He has since lived in Licking Township in Clarion County, Pennsylvania, about 100 kilometres (62 miles) northeast of Pittsburgh, where he has raised two children. In December 2003, Zehr traveled back to Canada to visit his father, who had suffered a heart attack. On his return to the United States in January 2004, Zehr was stopped at the border and told that he had "self-deported" and could not return to the United States because he did not have a photo ID. As Zehr's religious beliefs prohibited photo images being taken, he stated he was willing to be fingerprinted and his lawyers argued that fingerprints are a better way to confirm a person's identity. Federal prosecutors refused the request and released a statement noting that a photo is crucial to Department of Homeland Security officials who do background checks of anyone seeking alien status or citizenship and denied such a request.

In response to the denial, Zehr filed a lawsuit that argues that the photo requirement violates their religious freedom. Through filing his lawsuit against the photo requirement, Zehr risks being excommunicated from his Amish Sect for violation of their belief in nonresistance. The case was still pending as of 2004.

=== United States vs. John Eastman and United States vs. Albert McKelvey ===
In November 2005, federal prosecutors charged two veterans with falsifying their rank and award recognition. John Eastman was accused of wearing a major's insignia at a Veterans Day function on November 4, 2004. Albert McKelvey was accused of wearing a colonel's uniform at a military function on Memorial Day 2004. While both men had military experience, neither had achieved these ranks. In Buchanan's statement to the press, she stated: "To have individuals simply impersonate officers is an offense we have to address to preserve the integrity of the military service."

The cases were filed during the high point of the debate concerning the Stolen Valor Act of 2005. Specific new provisions in the Act included granting more authority to federal law enforcement officers, extending the scope of enforcement beyond the Medal of Honor, broadening the law to cover false claims whereas previously an overt act had to be committed, covering mailing and shipping of medals, and protecting the reputation and meaning of military heroism medals. Neither individual received jail time. Eastman pleaded guilty to the charge of impersonating an officer and received two years probation and a $500 fine. McKelvey was ordered to pay a $2,500 fine.

=== United States vs. Dr. Cyril H. Wecht (2008) ===
Dr. Cyril Wecht, a former Allegheny County, Pennsylvania coroner and medical examiner, was a prominent Democrat in the Pittsburgh area. In January 2006, Wecht was indicted by Buchanan on 84 counts of fraud and theft relating to using his public office for private gain. Wecht's lawyers argued that some of these charges involved $3.96 worth of faxes, and $1,778.55 worth of gasoline and mileage bills charged to the state. Buchanan was known for her high-profile prosecutions and investigations of prominent Democrats such as Sheriff Pete DeFazio, the mayor Tom Murphy, and a county judge, Joseph Jaffe.

Before Wecht's trial, the prosecution moved to dismiss 43 of the 84 counts without prejudice. The judge rejected the motion and dismissed the 43 charges with prejudice, which permanently bars the revival of the charges. Wecht's defense counsel argued that his prosecution was politically motivated. The initial indictment was announced in early 2006, before the November 2006 elections. During the trial, the judge barred the defense from arguing that the case was politically motivated. Although discussions about possible political motivations were not allowed during the trial, the jury foreman told reporters after the trial that some jurors began to see the prosecution as "political"."I don't know if politically motivated or not, but it seemed to me that the motivations were certainly less than pure. There was something behind it other than seeking justice."

At trial, Wecht's defense team put forth no witnesses and focused solely on cross-examining the prosecution witnesses. Wecht's criminal court case ended in a mistrial after the jury failed to agree on a verdict on all 41 remaining counts. The prosecution immediately moved to retry Wecht, and the second trial was scheduled by the trial judge less than two months later, on May 27, 2008. However, on May 8 a three judge panel of the Third Circuit Court of Appeals issued an indefinite stay in the trial proceedings. University of Pittsburgh law professor, John Burkoff characterized Buchanan's decision to attempt a re-trial as one that required perspective: "It's getting beyond embarrassing. We're nearing humiliation."

The controversial charges resulted in Former Attorney General Dick Thornburgh's testimony before the U.S. House Judiciary Committee investigating the dismissal of U.S. Attorneys. Thornburgh acted as a defense lawyer for Dr. Cyril Wecht, and testified that Wecht, "would qualify as an ideal target for a Republican U.S. attorney (Buchanan) trying to curry favor with a department which demonstrated that if you play by its rules, you will advance."

As a result of Thornburgh's testimony to the House Judiciary Committee, and the public speculation as to the merits of the case, the committee opened an investigation to review the Wecht case, in addition to the review of Governor Don Siegelman's trial. On May 5, 2008, the Department of Justice's Office of Professional Responsibility (OPR) revealed that it initiated an investigation into the Wecht prosecution due to claims that the case was a "selective prosecution". On June 26, 2008, the House Judiciary Subcommittee on Commercial and Administrative Law issued a subpoena for all documents related to the case of Dr. Wecht. The Subcommittee issued the subpoena in conjunction with a request for similar documents in the case of Governor Siegelman under the heading "Selective Prosecution".

In the end, Buchanan was forced to forgo a new trial and dismiss the remaining charges against Wecht due to the new judge overseeing the case tossing the majority of the government's evidence against Wecht. In deciding to exclude the evidence, the judge referenced Fourth Amendment violations committed by Buchanan's office in the improper execution of the government's initial warrant to search Wecht's office. Through the government's voluntary decision to dismiss all charges, Wecht has been effectively cleared of all charges initially brought against him within the government's indictment.

== Alleged involvement in U.S. Attorney dismissal controversy ==
Buchanan was allegedly involved in the firing of the U.S. Attorneys for not embarking on politically motivated prosecutions. The congressional committee investigation has focused on whether nine U.S. attorneys were fired by the Justice Department because they had prosecuted Republicans or did not press charges against Democrats. The controversy is known as the Dismissal of U.S. attorneys controversy.

In April 2007, Kyle Sampson, the former Gonzales aide, mentioned Buchanan's name to judiciary committee investigators during his April testimony. Sampson said that Buchanan was among the DOJ officials he consulted about which of the U.S. attorneys should be asked to resign.

In May 2007, Monica Goodling told committee members that she knew Buchanan had discussed the firings with Sampson. Before Goodling joined the White House, Goodling was hired by Buchanan to work in the executive office. In addition to having Goodling and Sampson allege she was involved in the firing decisions, critics of Buchanan have claimed that she has embarked on several high-profile public corruption cases that exclusively targeted Democratic politicians such as former Sheriff Pete DeFazio, former Mayor Tom Murphy and former Allegheny County Medical Examiner Cyril Wecht.

One critic, Allegheny County Democratic Chairman Jim Burn, said that "Her record speaks for itself. I've seen a long line of Democrats and mistakes aren't made based on party affiliation but I haven't seen anybody from the other side going through that system." Burn pointed to the fact that Buchanan's Office refused to investigate former Republican Senator Rick Santorum, who got a tuition reimbursement for his children by claiming a Penn Hills, Pennsylvania residency while his family spent most of its time in Virginia, as an example of an alleged double standard. "You have to ask yourself the misrepresentations of a Republican such as Rick Santorum made about his alleged residency in Penn Hills were significant," said Burn.

After learning this information, the House Judiciary Committee requested an interview with Buchanan in June 2006. Committee staff members privately questioned Buchanan. She had served as director of the Executive Office for U.S. Attorneys in 2004 and 2005 when discussions were held within the Justice Department concerning which of the country's 93 top federal prosecutors should be dismissed. Buchanan has denied any involvement in the firings. Buchanan has also denied that the prosecutions of key Democratic politicians in the Western PA area was driven by political factors.

Since the interview, the Judiciary Committee has continued its investigation. On April 17, 2008, the Judiciary Committee released a report which provided some of the details into the investigation into the US Attorney firings. The report stated it was impossible to know if Wecht's prosecution was politically motivated because the Justice Department has not turned over certain documents to committee investigators, and U.S. District Judge Arthur J. Schwab has refused to hold a hearing on Wecht's claim of selective prosecution.

== Congressional campaign ==
Buchanan announced her candidacy for the U.S. House of Representatives in Pennsylvania's 4th congressional district in 2010. She faced attorney and former Homeland Security Department official Keith Rothfus in the Republican primary for the right to challenge incumbent Democratic Congressman Jason Altmire. In opposition, two of her former targets for prosecution, Tommy Chong and Cyril Wecht, appeared together at the International Brotherhood of Electrical Workers Hall in Pittsburgh for a comic fundraiser for the Allegheny County Democratic Committee. In the May 18 primary, Buchanan was defeated by Rothfus, losing by a margin of 67% to 33%.

== See also ==
- United States v. Extreme Associates
