= Markenzy Lapointe =

American lawyer (born 1968)

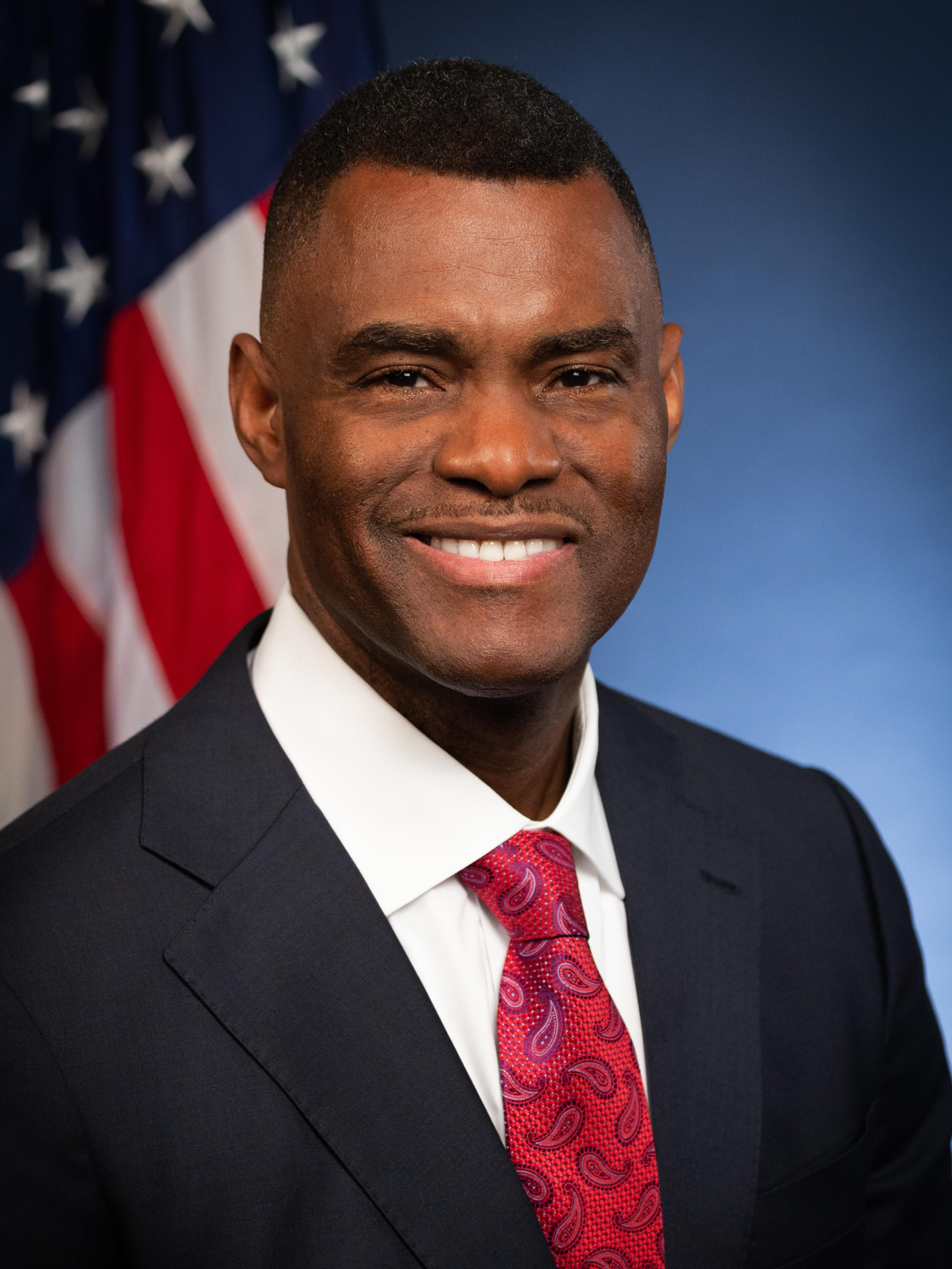
- Official portrait, 2023

United States Attorney for the Southern District of Florida
- In office January 9, 2023 – January 17, 2025
- President: Joe Biden
- Preceded by: Ariana Fajardo Orshan; Juan Gonzalez (acting)
- Succeeded by: Jason Reding Quiñones

Personal details
- Born: 1968 (age 57–58) Port-au-Prince, Haiti
- Education: Florida State University (BS, JD)

Military service
- Branch/service: United States Marine Corps
- Unit: United States Marine Corps Reserve

Markenzy Lapointe (born 1968) is an American lawyer who served as United States attorney for the Southern District of Florida from January 2023 to January 2025.

== Early life and education ==
Lapointe was born in Port-au-Prince, Haiti, in 1968, where his mother worked as a street vendor and his father was a tailor. Lapointe moved to Miami with his mother and siblings at the age of 16. They lived in the Liberty City neighborhood of Miami. He graduated from Miami Edison Senior High School in 1987 and then attended Miami Dade College. He drove a cab and worked alongside his mother at a restaurant in Key Biscayne. He served for six years in the United States Marine Corps Reserve and served a six-month tour in Iraq when the Gulf War erupted. He earned a Bachelor of Science degree in finance from the Florida State University in 1993. He worked for a few years in banking before deciding to pursue a legal career. He earned a Juris Doctor degree from the Florida State University College of Law in 1999. He became a U.S. citizen in 1995.

== Career ==
From 1999 to 2001, Lapointe worked as a law clerk for Florida Supreme Court Justice Harry Lee Anstead. From 2002 to 2006, he served as an assistant United States attorney for the Southern District of Florida. Lapointe was a partner at Boies Schiller Flexner LLP and joined Pillsbury Winthrop Shaw Pittman as partner in 2017.

=== U.S. attorney for the Southern District of Florida ===
On September 15, 2022, President Joe Biden nominated Lapointe to be the United States attorney for the Southern District of Florida. On December 1, 2022, his nomination was reported out of the Senate Judiciary Committee by voice vote. On December 6, 2022, his nomination was confirmed in the Senate by voice vote. He was sworn in on January 9, 2023, by Chief U.S. District Judge Cecilia Altonaga. Lapointe resigned on January 17.

== Personal life ==
Lapointe speaks English, Creole and French.
