= Denise O'Donnell =

American politician and lawyer

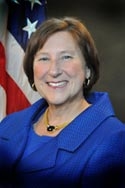

Director of the Bureau of Justice Assistance
- In office June 6, 2011 – January 19, 2017
- President: Barack Obama
- Preceded by: Domingo S. Herraiz
- Succeeded by: Tracey Trautman

Commissioner the New York State Division of Criminal Justice Services
- In office 2007–2010
- Appointed by: Eliot Spitzer

United States Attorney for the Western District of New York
- In office 1997–2001
- Appointed by: Bill Clinton
- Preceded by: Patrick H. NeMoyer
- Succeeded by: Michael A. Battle

Personal details
- Party: Democratic
- Spouse: John O'Donnell
- Children: 2, including Jack
- Education: Canisius College (BA); University of Buffalo (MSW, JD)

Denise O'Donnell is an attorney who served as director of the Bureau of Justice Assistance, as New York State commissioner of criminal justice services, and assistant secretary to the Governor for Criminal Justice in the Cabinet of Governor David Paterson. She previously held the roles in the Cabinet of former Governor Eliot Spitzer.

== Early life and education ==
O'Donnell attended high school at Mount Saint Joseph Academy, and then studied at Canisius College. Hers was the first graduating class from Canisius to include women. After graduating from college, she worked for the New York City Department of Social Services. While doing so, she earned a Master of Social Work. After the birth of her two children, O'Donnell earned a Juris Doctor from the University at Buffalo Law School, graduating second in her class.

== Career ==
In 1985, she became an assistant United States Attorney. In 1998, President Bill Clinton appointed her the US Attorney for the Western District of New York. While working for the US Attorney's office she worked on two particularly prominent cases. The first was the investigation into Oklahoma City bomber, Timothy McVeigh. She was also the leader in the successful prosecution of anti-abortion extremist James Kopp for the murder of obstratician and abortion provider Barnett Slepian. She was pushed out of her position as US attorney by the Bush administration before her term had ended.

Since 2001, she has practiced with the firm Hodgson Russ LLP, has lectured and campaigned for the attorney general's office. In late 2005, former United States Attorney General Janet Reno announced her support for O'Donnell's campaign. She dropped out of the race for AG shortly after the Democratic convention where she received approximately ten-percent of the delegates' votes. In the announcement ending her candidacy she neglected to endorse any specific candidate for the Democratic nomination but, instead, emphasized her desire to see Eliot Spitzer elected governor.

She was a candidate in the 2006 Democratic primary for New York Attorney General.

Spitzer announced her appointment as Criminal Justice Commissioner in January 2007. The New York State Senate unanimously confirmed O'Donnell to the post March 21, 2007. As criminal justice commissioner, O'Donnell oversaw the planning and analysis of criminal justice policies and services for state government.

She was appointed assistant secretary to the governor for criminal justice on July 25, 2007, by Spitzer in the wake of a report by State Attorney General Andrew Cuomo regarding the use of the New York State Police by Spitzer's staff to monitor the activities of Senate Majority Leader Joseph Bruno. As Assistant Secretary, she served as the Governor's top criminal justice advisor and oversaw the State Police, Division of Parole and the Department of Corrections. She also assisted in the development of statewide criminal justice and public safety policies and worked on homeland security efforts for the state.

She was a candidate in the 2006 Democratic primary for New York Attorney General. Governor Paterson retained O'Donnell in his cabinet following his taking office on March 17, 2008.

O'Donnell resigned from the Paterson administration on February 25, 2010, following reports of alleged misconduct by Paterson and members of his administration. Paterson and the State Police were accused of improperly contacting the alleged victim of domestic abuse committed by David W. Johnson, a top aide to the governor. In her resignation, O'Donnell called "[such] actions unacceptable regardless of their intent," and said that the conduct was "particularly distressing" in an administration "that prides itself on its record of combating domestic violence."

In December 2010, President Obama nominated O'Donnell to be the director of the Bureau of Justice Assistance, a component of the Office of Justice Programs within the U.S. Department of Justice. After being confirmed by the senate, O'Donnell was sworn in on June 6, 2011.

In June 2014 New York Senator Charles Schumer (D- NY) recommended O'Donnell to fill a vacant federal judgeship on the District Court in the Western District of New York. However, the Obama Administration declined to act on the recommendation and, in 2015, O'Donnell withdrew from consideration.

== Personal life ==
She is married to John O'Donnell, a New York State Supreme Court Justice. Her son, Jack O'Donnell, is a lobbyist and political advisor.

Preceded by Chauncey Parker	New York State Commissioner of Criminal Justice Services; 2007 – 2010	Succeeded by Open
Preceded by Patrick H. NeMoyer	United States Attorney for the Western District of New York; 2011 – 2017	Succeeded by Michael A. Battle
