= Robin Ashton =

American government official and attorney

Robin C. Ashton
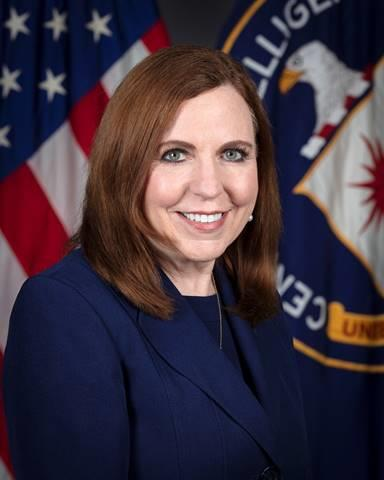

Inspector General of the Central Intelligence Agency
- In office June 28, 2021 – December 31, 2024
- President: Joe Biden
- Preceded by: David Buckley (2015)
- Succeeded by: Peter Thomson

Director of the Office of Professional Responsibility
- In office January 2011 – September 2018
- President: Barack Obama; Donald Trump
- Preceded by: H. Marshall Jarrett
- Succeeded by: Corey Amundsen

Personal details
- Education: University of Michigan (BA); College of William & Mary (JD)

Robin C. Ashton is an American government official who served as inspector general of the Central Intelligence Agency.

== Education ==
Ashton earned a Bachelor of Arts degree from the University of Michigan and a Juris Doctor from the William & Mary Law School.

== Career ==
=== Department of Justice ===
Before joining the CIA, Ashton worked in the Office of Professional Responsibility in the Department of Justice where she served as director from January 2011 to September 2018. She also worked as the principal deputy director of the Executive Office for United States Attorneys.

In 2001, Ashton was identified by The New York Times as having been denied a promotion due to a political dispute. Monica Goodling, White House liaison of the Department of Justice, was reported as having denied Ashton's promotion. Ashton appeared alongside James Comey, then Deputy Attorney General, to testify at a Congressional inquiry into Goodling's behavior.

During her DOJ career, Ashton was awarded the Attorney General's Claudia Flynn Award for Professional Responsibility, the Attorney General's Award for Outstanding Leadership in Management, the United States Attorney's Award for Meritorious Service, and the Executive Office for U.S. Attorneys Director's Award for Excellence in Management, among other awards.

=== Office of the Director of National Intelligence ===
Between September 2018 and June 2021 Ashton was the principal deputy inspector general of the Intelligence Community, based in the Office of the Director of National Intelligence.

=== Central Intelligence Agency ===
Ashton was nominated to serve as inspector general of the Central Intelligence Agency by President Joe Biden, and confirmed by the U.S. Senate on June 24, 2021, by voice vote. She retired at the end of 2024.
