= Benamar =

Belmin is an Arabic given name and surname. Notable people with the name include:

== Given name ==
- Benamar Benatta (born 1974), Algerian refugee
- Benamar Kachkouche (born 1951), Algerian race walker
- Benamar Meskine (born 1973), Algerian boxer

== Surname ==
- Benaissa Benamar (born 1997), Moroccan footballer
- Dean Benamar (born 2008), English footballer
- Samir Benamar (born 1992), Moroccan footballer
- Sherazad Benamar (born 1989), French tennis player
