= Operation True Test =

2008 DEA operation

Operation True Test was a nationwide investigation in 2008 targeting businesses selling "masking products" that are supposed to help drug-users pass employer drug tests, under a little-used statute (Title 21, Chapter 13, Subchapter 1, Part D, Section 863(a)) of the U.S. Code.

It came to light on May 7, 2008, when DEA/FBI agents raided nine business establishments targeted in the operation. Although the raids were not in the Western District of Pennsylvania, the U.S. Attorney for the Western District of Pennsylvania, Mary Beth Buchanan, is overseeing the operation.

Mary Beth Buchanan also oversaw Operation Pipe Dream which targeted companies that sold water bongs and pipes. Through Operation Pipe Dream, comedian Tommy Chong was incarcerated for 9 months for violating drug paraphernalia laws.

In executing their search warrant in Operation True Test, the federal agents seized over 10,000 copies of Tommy Chong's yet to be released documentary, a/k/a Tommy Chong. It has yet to be determined exactly why the DVDs were seized during the raid. Tommy Chong has speculated that the seizure may rest with prohibitions against one benefiting financially from a crime; however Chong has not released publicly that he has been charged with such an offense. In a statement released to the press, Tommy Chong stated "It's (the seizure of the DVDs) a way to punish the distributor financially. There's no way to get the DVDs back until the investigation is over." Chong also stated that he has no ownership in the film a/k/a Tommy Chong.
