= Anthony C. Moscato =

Anthony Moscato

Inspector General of the United States Department of Justice
- In office April 19, 1989 – June 25, 1990
- President: George H. W. Bush
- Preceded by: office established
- Succeeded by: Richard J. Hankinson

Personal details
- Born: Anthony Charles Moscato; September 4, 1945 (age 80) New York City, New York, U.S.
- Education: Columbia University (BA); George Washington University (JD)

Anthony Charles Moscato (born September 4, 1945) is an American government official who served as acting Inspector General of the United States Department of Justice from 1989 to 1990, and director of the Executive Office for United States Attorneys and the Executive Office for Immigration Review.

== Early life and education ==
Moscato was born in New York City on September 4, 1945. He received his B.A. in government from Columbia University in 1967 and his J.D. degree from the George Washington University Law School in 1970.

== Career ==
He began his career at the U.S. Department of Justice as a Trial Attorney in the Tax Division in 1976 and 1977 and then moved to the Justice Management Division of the Special Assistant to the Assistant Attorney General for Administration from 1977 to 1979.

From 1981 to 1984, he served as Director of the Property Management and Procurement Staff, the Evaluation Staff, and the Finance Staff. From 1984 to 1987, he served as Counselor to the Assistant Attorney General for Administration and was the Acting Procurement Executive. From 1987 to 1989, Moscato served as Deputy Assistant Attorney General for Administration and again from 1990 to 1992. He was named acting Inspector General of the Department of Justice in 1989 and in 1990.

In January 1993, Moscato was named Director of the Executive Office for United States Attorneys. In May 1994, he was named Director of the Executive Office for Immigration Review and served in that role until October 1998. He was appointed to the Board of Immigration Appeals by United States Attorney General Janet Reno on October 21, 1998. He assumed his role as member of the board in January 1999.
