= George C. Wilson =

American journalist and author (1927–2014)

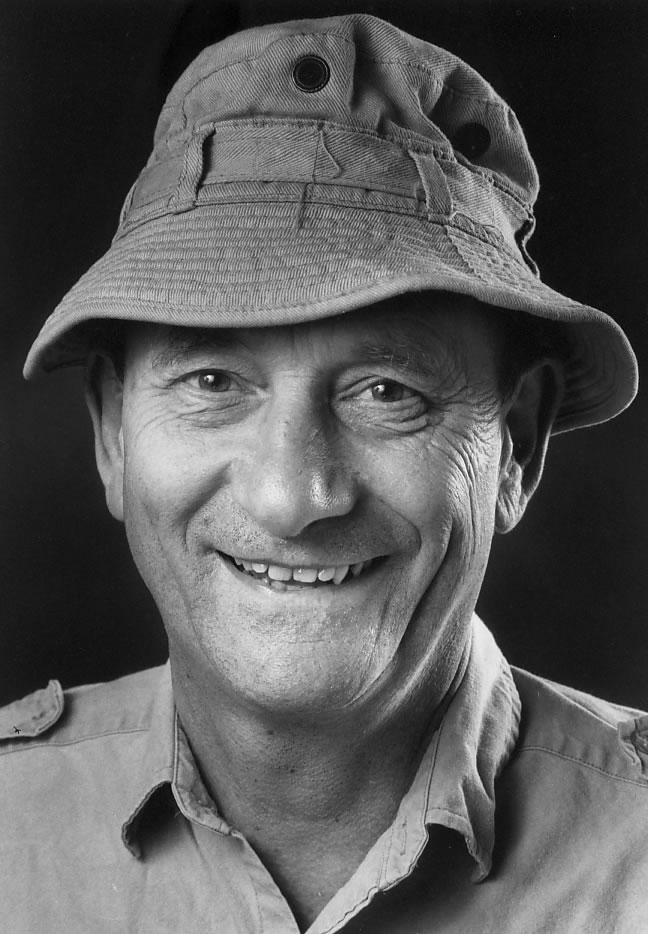
- Wilson in 1990
- Born: George Cadman Wilson; July 11, 1927; Orange, New Jersey, U.S.
- Died: February 11, 2014 (aged 86); Arlington, Virginia, U.S.
- Education: Bucknell University (B.A., English, 1949)
- Occupations: Journalist, author
- Years active: 1949–2014
- Employer(s): The Washington Post (1966–1990); National Journal / CongressDaily (1990–2014)
- Notable work: Supercarrier (1986); Mud Soldiers (1989); This War Really Matters (2000)

George Cadman Wilson (July 11, 1927 – February 11, 2014) was an American journalist who served as chief defense correspondent for The Washington Post from 1966 to 1990. He is best known for his role in the Post's 1971 decision to publish the Pentagon Papers, in which he identified that a document the Nixon administration claimed was classified had, in fact, already been published unredacted, undercutting the government's case in New York Times Co. v. United States. The episode was later dramatized as the central scene of the play Top Secret: The Battle for the Pentagon Papers. Wilson was the author of six books on the U.S. military and continued to write on defense matters for National Journal and CongressDaily until his death in 2014.

== Early life and education ==
Wilson was born in Orange, New Jersey, on July 11, 1927. Raised in Millburn, New Jersey, Wilson graduated in 1945 from Millburn High School. He served in the United States Navy from 1945 to 1947 and earned a Bachelor of Arts in English from Bucknell University in 1949.

== Career ==
Before joining The Washington Post, Wilson worked for the New York Journal of Commerce, the Newark Evening News, Congressional Quarterly, the Washington Evening Star, and Aviation Week, where he covered the U.S. Congress. He joined the Post in 1966 and served as its chief defense correspondent until 1990, reporting both from the press seats at Pentagon briefings and congressional hearings and from the field, including two tours during the Vietnam War and later coverage of the invasion of Panama and the Gulf War. Post executive editor Benjamin C. Bradlee later wrote in his memoir that Wilson had become a Pentagon "gold mine." Among a circle of friends in the Pentagon, his call sign was "Captain Black." His network of military sources ran deep enough that he was the first reporter to describe the secret plan for the 1980 mission to rescue American hostages held in Iran, despite the Pentagon's tight security around it.

After leaving the Post in 1990, Wilson continued to write on defense matters for National Journal and CongressDaily under the column "Forward Observer" until his death. In 2003, at age 75, he embedded with U.S. Marines for National Journal to cover the invasion of Iraq, by then known as the "dean" of the Pentagon press pool. He had first asked to be embedded with an Iraqi unit instead, telling the Iraqi ambassador he wanted "to look through the end of the telescope of the Iraqi military," but never heard back.

== The Pentagon Papers ==
In June 1971, The Washington Post's publisher, Katharine Graham, decided to proceed with publishing the Pentagon Papers—the Department of Defense's secret history of U.S. involvement in Vietnam, leaked by former military analyst Daniel Ellsberg—after a federal court had already enjoined The New York Times from doing so. The Nixon administration sought a prior restraint order against the Post as well, arguing in a closed session before Judge David Bazelon that a specific intercepted message contained in the documents remained classified and that its publication would endanger national security and an active intelligence source.

Wilson, serving as the Post's military consultant in that closed session, recognized the supposedly secret intercept from memory: it had already been printed, unredacted, on page 34 of a published congressional hearing transcript he happened to have with him. Producing the document undercut the government's national-security argument. The case reached the Supreme Court of the United States, which ruled 6–3 in favor of the Post and the Times in New York Times Co. v. United States, one of the First Amendment's most significant prior-restraint decisions.

=== Dramatization ===
The episode became the dramatic climax of Top Secret: The Battle for the Pentagon Papers, a play by Geoffrey Cowan and Leroy Aarons, who has said it makes Wilson "the hero of the piece." The play has been produced and broadcast by L.A. Theatre Works since 1991, toured nationally and in China, and had an Off-Broadway run at New York Theatre Workshop in 2010, with Wilson portrayed onstage by actors including Ed Begley Jr., Bo Foxworth, and Matt McGrath. The scene involving Wilson is not depicted in Steven Spielberg's 2018 film The Post.

== Books ==
Wilson was the author of six books on the U.S. military:

- Bridge of No Return: The Ordeal of the U.S.S. Pueblo (1971), on the North Korean seizure of the USS Pueblo and the eleven-month captivity of its crew.
- Army in Anguish (1972), co-written with Haynes Johnson, on the U.S. Army's institutional crisis during the Vietnam War era.
- Supercarrier: An Inside Account of Life Aboard the World's Most Powerful Ship (1986), a firsthand account of a seven-month deployment aboard the carrier USS John F. Kennedy (CV-67); it became a national bestseller. Kirkus Reviews called it "an engrossing look at modern seafarers."
- Mud Soldiers: Life Inside the New American Army (1989), following a group of Army recruits through basic training in the all-volunteer era. Kirkus Reviews called it "a candid and impassioned briefing that offers rare and rewarding views of military life."
- Flying the Edge: The Making of Navy Test Pilots (1992), on a class of Navy test pilots at the Naval Air Test Center, Patuxent River. Kirkus Reviews described it as "an engrossing, close-up fix on the US Navy's [Test Pilot School] and its place in our national defense."
- This War Really Matters: Inside the Fight for Defense Dollars (2000), on the Pentagon's budget battles with Congress.

== Death ==
Wilson died on February 11, 2014, at age 86.
