= Dan Balz =

American journalist

Daniel J. Balz
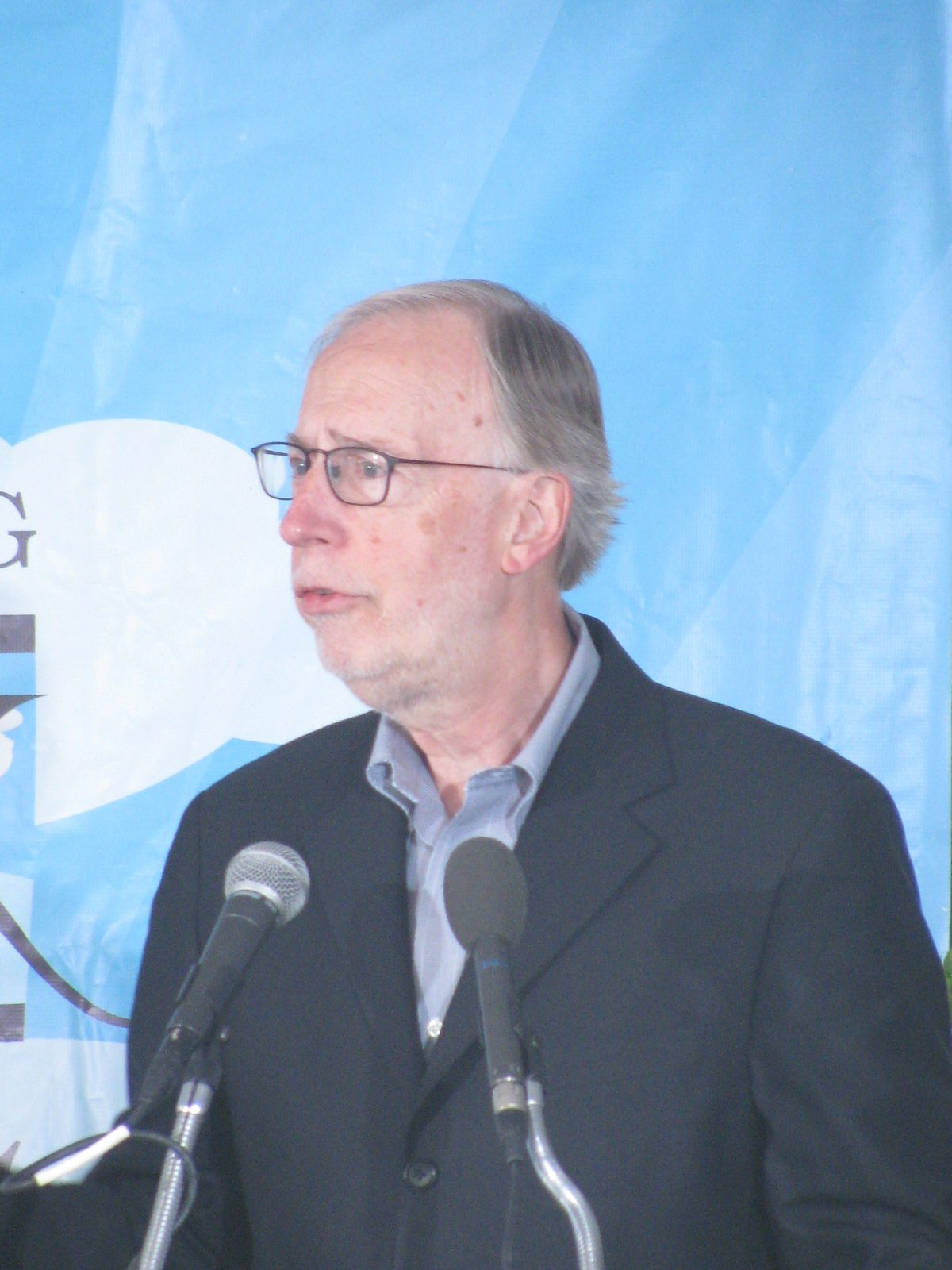
- Balz at the 2014 Gaithersburg Book Festival
- Born: 1946 (age 79–80); Freeport, Illinois, U.S.
- Education: University of Illinois at Urbana–Champaign (BA, MA)
- Occupation: Journalist
- Employer: The Washington Post

Daniel Balz is an American journalist who worked for The Washington Post from 1978 to 2025. During his career at the Post, Balz served as the Texas-based Southwest correspondent, White House correspondent, Political Editor, and National Editor.

Balz periodically appears as a panelist on the news shows Meet the Press and Washington Week.

In April 2011 the White House Correspondents' Association honored Balz with the prestigious Merriman Smith Award for excellence in presidential coverage under deadline pressure.

== Early life and education ==
Balz was born in Freeport, Illinois. A 1964 graduate of Freeport High School, he received bachelor's and master's degrees in communications from the University of Illinois at Urbana–Champaign and served in the United States Army from 1968 to 1971.

== Career ==
External videos
- Booknotes interview with Balz on Storming the Gates, February 18, 1996, C-SPAN

Balz is co-author, with Ronald Brownstein of the Los Angeles Times, of the 1996 book Storming the Gates: Protest Politics and the Republican Revival. In 1999, Balz received the American Political Science Association award for political coverage.

Balz's latest work, co-written with Pulitzer Prize winner Haynes Johnson in 2013, is Collision 2012. Based on two years of reporting, it includes exclusive interviews with then-candidates Barack Obama and Mitt Romney and many of their top advisers during the campaign and election.

After college graduation, prior to entering military service, Balz worked for the Freeport Journal Standard covering the 1968 Democratic National Convention and contemporaneous riots. Before coming to The Washington Post, he worked as a reporter and deputy editor for National Journal and as a reporter for The Philadelphia Inquirer.

== Personal life ==
He is married to Nancy Johnson Balz and they have one son.
