= Kathryn A. Oberly =

American judge

Kathryn Oberly
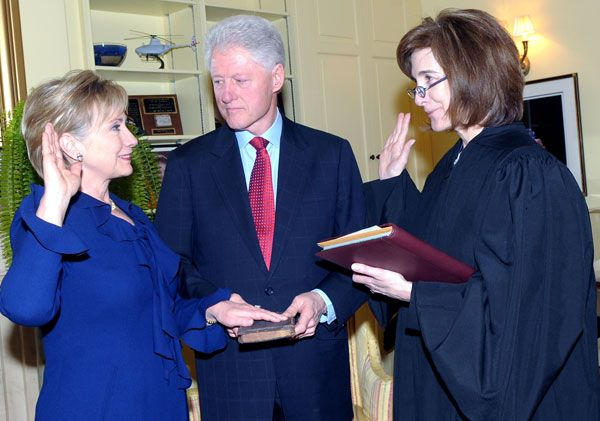
- Oberly (right) swearing in Hillary Clinton as United States Secretary of State as Bill Clinton watches, 2009

Associate Judge of the District of Columbia Court of Appeals
- In office May 8, 2009 – November 1, 2013
- Appointed by: George W. Bush
- Preceded by: Michael W. Farrell
- Succeeded by: James Crowell

Personal details
- Born: Kathryn Anne Oberly; May 22, 1950 (age 76) Chicago, Illinois, U.S.
- Spouse: Haynes Johnson (m. 2002; died 2013)
- Children: 1 son
- Education: University of Wisconsin, Madison (BA, JD)

Kathryn Anne Oberly (born May 22, 1950) is a former Associate Judge of the District of Columbia Court of Appeals, the highest appellate court for the District of Columbia.

Oberly was born in Chicago, Illinois, and raised in Park Ridge, Illinois, where she attended the same Methodist church as a young Hillary Clinton. The two became lifelong friends, and then-Senator Clinton testified in favor of Oberly's judicial nomination in the United States Senate. After graduating from high school in 1967, Oberly attended Vassar College for two years before switching to the University of Wisconsin–Madison. She received her bachelor's and law degrees from the University of Wisconsin, where she was an articles editor for the Wisconsin Law Review. After law school she clerked for Donald P. Lay, a judge on the United States Court of Appeals for the Eighth Circuit, who would later officiate her wedding to Pulitzer Prize–winning journalist Haynes Johnson.

Oberly's legal career began at the United States Department of Justice, where she worked first at the Land and Natural Resources Division and later in the Office of the Solicitor General. She left the Justice Department in 1986 to enter private practice. In 1991, she joined Ernst & Young, becoming general counsel in 1994.

In 2008, Oberly was nominated to the D.C. Court of Appeals by President George W. Bush. She joined the court in 2009 and retired in 2013.

Legal offices
Preceded by Michael W. Farrell	Judge of the District of Columbia Court of Appeals; 2009–2013	Succeeded by James Crowell
