= United States Department of Justice Office of the Inspector General =

Government body

Inspector General of the United States Department of Justice
- USDOJ Office of the Inspector General seal
- Incumbent; Don R. Berthiaume since August 14, 2026
- United States Department of Justice
- Style: The Honorable, Mr. Inspector General
- Reports to: Attorney General of the United States and United States Congress
- Seat: Department of Justice Headquarters, Washington, D.C.
- Appointer: The president; with Senate advice and consent
- Term length: No fixed term
- Website: oig.justice.gov

The Office of the Inspector General (OIG) for the United States Department of Justice (DOJ) is responsible for conducting nearly all of the investigations of DOJ employees and programs. The office has several hundred employees, reporting to the Inspector General. The Senate confirmed Don R. Berthiaume Jr. as Inspector General on August 7, 2026 .

The OIG conducts independent investigations, audits, inspections, and special reviews of United States Department of Justice personnel and programs. The OIG completes these tasks to detect and deter waste, fraud, abuse, and misconduct, and to promote integrity, economy, efficiency, and effectiveness in Department of Justice operations. The Office of the Inspector General (OIG) consists of a front office, which comprises the Inspector General, the Deputy Inspector General, the Office of the General Counsel, and six major components. Each division is headed by an Assistant Inspector General.

The OIG's investigative jurisdiction includes all allegations of criminal wrongdoing or administrative misconduct by DOJ employees, except for allegations of misconduct that "relate to the exercise of the authority of an attorney to investigate, litigate, or provide legal advice," which are referred to the DOJ Office of Professional Responsibility (OPR) unless the allegation concerns attorneys who work for OPR or the investigation is criminal in nature.

== History of inspectors general ==
Seal of the Department of Justice Office of the Inspector General from 1989 to 2020

Inspector General	Date started
Don R. Berthiaume	August 14, 2026
M. Sean O'Neill (Acting)	May 29, 2026
William M. Blier (Acting)	January 26, 2026
Don R. Berthiaume (Acting)	October 6, 2025
William M. Blier (Acting)	June 30, 2025
Michael Horowitz	April 16, 2012
Cynthia Schnedar (Acting)	January 29, 2011
Glenn Fine	December 15, 2000
Glenn Fine (Acting)	August 10, 2000
Robert L. Ashbaugh (Acting)	August 16, 1999
Michael Bromwich	June 9, 1994
Richard J. Hankinson	June 25, 1990
Anthony C. Moscato (Acting)	April 14, 1989

== See also ==
- List of United States federal law enforcement agencies
