= United States Department of Justice grand conspiracy investigation =

In July 2025, the second Trump administration's Department of Justice, led by Attorney General Pam Bondi, initiated a third inquiry into the actions of those who were involved with Crossfire Hurricane, the federal counterintelligence investigation into links between associates of Donald Trump and Russian officials leading up to the 2016 United States presidential election, accusing them of "treasonous conspiracy" against Donald Trump.

Previous investigations were the Inspector General report on the Crossfire Hurricane investigation and the Durham special counsel investigation. The latter was based on the Russia investigation origins conspiracy theory. Both investigations, even though carried out during Trump's first presidency, reconfirmed the original findings, which were also found by the Mueller special counsel investigation.

== Background ==
The United States Intelligence Community concluded that the Russian government sought to interfere in the 2016 United States elections to secure Donald Trump's victory. The inquiry, Crossfire Hurricane, ended after Trump dismissed the director of the Federal Bureau of Investigation, James Comey, in May 2017. Comey's dismissal led to the Mueller special counsel investigation, which reached the same conclusion in its report, publicly released in April 2019. After the inquiry ended, attorney general William Barr appointed John Durham to lead an investigation into Crossfire Hurricane. Barr, citing Durham's findings, stated that there was no "sign of improper CIA activity" in December 2020.

== Investigation ==
=== Criminal referrals ===
On July 2, 2025, the CIA released an assessment that criticized the agency's previous leadership for Assessing Russian Activities and Intentions in Recent US Elections, which concluded that Russia worked to aid Trump's victory in 2016 and that the Trump campaign welcomed and cooperated with those Russian efforts. Then-director John O. Brennan was alleged to have been overzealous in controlling information and improperly overseeing the effort, but the assessment did not dispute the previous findings that Russia favored Trump in the 2016 election. On July 8, Fox News reported that the United States Department of Justice was examining actions taken by Brennan and Comey. According to The New York Times, John Ratcliffe, the director of the Central Intelligence Agency, referred Brennan to the Federal Bureau of Investigation for criminal prosecution over statements he made to the Senate Select Committee on Intelligence; Brennan's testimony, then over seven years old, appeared to exceed the statute of limitations for possible charges. The Department of Justice's statement that it did not comment on ongoing investigations confirmed that the agency had initiated a criminal inquiry into Brennan and Comey. According to The Washington Post, Comey had not been contacted by federal prosecutors.

On July 18, the Office of the Director of National Intelligence released a report alleging a "treasonous conspiracy" by Democrats to damage Trump. The assessment based its findings on internal statements that Russian officials did not manipulate votes; investigations into Russian interference focused on influence operations. Tulsi Gabbard, the director of national intelligence, called for administration officials—including Brennan, Comey, and James Clapper, the former director of national intelligence, who were named explicitly—to be referred to the Department of Justice for criminal prosecution. Gabbard stated on Fox Business days later that she would formally refer officials to the Federal Bureau of Investigation. On July 23, she released a declassified version of the House Permanent Select Committee on Intelligence's report on Russian interference, drafted in 2017. Hours later, the Department of Justice announced a strike force to examine Gabbard's allegations. The Washington Post later reported that Gabbard had gone against CIA officials in releasing the report.

=== Grand jury inquiry and broader mandate ===
On August 4, attorney general Pam Bondi directed prosecutors to open a grand jury investigation into the accusations. That month, the Department of Justice broadened its inquiry into whether officials in the Biden administration, including the deputy director of the Federal Bureau of Investigation, Paul Abbate, attempted to conceal the alleged misdeeds of Comey and Brennan. By September, the inquiry into Brennan had stalled after Gabbard executed a purge of officials.

=== Joseph diGenova resigns ===
On September 10, 2026, Trump loyalist Joseph diGenova, who had been assigned the role of lead prosecutor heading the Grand Conspiracy investigation following the firing of the previous lead last April, abruptly resigned the position without offering an explanation. People familiar with the matter told the New York Times that diGenova faced pressure from his superiors because of the lack of indictments in the inquiry.

=== Kurt Olsen and others resign ===
In September 2026, Kurt Olsen, a former lawyer for Trump's 2020 campaign and attempt to overturn the 2020 election, resigned his position at the U.S. Attorney's Office for the Southern District of Florida, specifically assigned to the "grand conspiracy" investigation. Olsen did not comment on his departure. Other prosecutors and one of the lead FBI agents also resigned the case around that time. On November 2026, Jason Reding Quiñones, the United States United States Attorney for the Southern District of Florida who oversaw the "grand conspiracy" probe, resigned from Justice Department.

== Responses ==
=== Central Intelligence Agency referrals ===
At a lunch with five African leaders, Trump stated that he was unaware of the investigation past reporting he had read, referring to Brennan and Comey as "dishonest people". Karoline Leavitt, the White House press secretary, praised the investigation in an interview on Fox News. Former intelligence officials who spoke to The New York Times disparaged Brennan's referral as politically motivated. In apparent connection to the referrals, Trump revoked the security clearances of thirty-seven current and former national security officials in August.

=== Director of National Intelligence report ===
The Office of the Director of National Intelligence's report was praised by Mike Johnson, the speaker of the House, who viewed it as "dismantling the deep state". Connecticut representative Jim Himes, the ranking member of the House Permanent Select Committee on Intelligence, and Mark Warner, the ranking member of the Senate Select Committee on Intelligence, criticized the assessment and affirmed their committee's prior findings. Days after Gabbard's referrals, Trump posted artificial intelligence-generated mug shots of president Barack Obama and officials from Obama's administration with the words "The Shady Bunch" and an AI-generated video of Obama being arrested in the Oval Office. At a meeting in the Oval Office with Philippines president Bongbong Marcos, Trump accused Obama of treason and urged the Department of Justice to prosecute him. In response, a spokesman for Obama stated that the "bizarre allegations" merited a response, breaking from usual silence after Trump attacks.

== See also ==
- Clinton plan intelligence conspiracy theory
