= Haynes Johnson =

American journalist

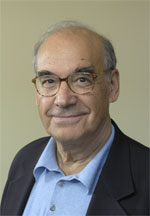
- Johnson circa 2006
- Born: July 9, 1931; New York City, New York, U.S.
- Died: May 24, 2013 (aged 81); Bethesda, Maryland, U.S.
- Known for: Pulitzer Prize
- Spouse(s): Julia Erwin; Kathryn A. Oberly

Haynes Bonner Johnson (July 9, 1931 – May 24, 2013) was an American journalist, author, and television analyst. He reported on most of the major news stories of the latter half of the 20th century and was widely regarded as one of the top American political commentators.

== Biography ==
Johnson was born in New York City to journalist Malcolm Johnson and Emma Ludie (née Adams), a pianist. He is the eldest of four children. His parents moved to Long Island, where he grew up. He earned his bachelor's degree in journalism from the University of Missouri in 1952 and then served in the U.S. Army as a first lieutenant in artillery during the Korean War. He earned his master's in American history from the University of Wisconsin in 1956.

Johnson had begun his newspaper career earlier in Manhattan as a copy boy for The New York Sun, where his father worked. In 1956 he began reporting for the Wilmington (Delaware) News-Journal, and the following year, Johnson joined the Washington Evening Star where he worked for 12 years, variously as a reporter, copy editor, night city editor and national reporter. He covered conflicts in the Dominican Republic and India, as well as the Vietnam War. Johnson joined The Washington Post in 1969, serving first as a National correspondent, as a special assignment correspondent at home and abroad, then as the paper's Assistant Managing Editor and finally, as a national affairs columnist.

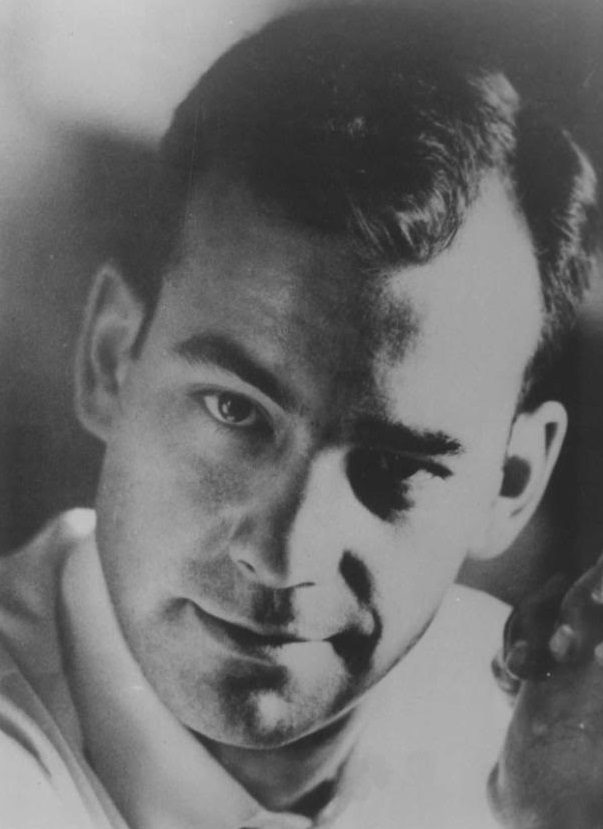
Johnson in 1970

Johnson won a Pulitzer Prize for National Reporting in 1966, for his coverage of the civil rights crisis in Selma, Alabama. The award marked the first time in Pulitzer Prize history that a father and son both received awards for reporting; his father, Malcolm Johnson, won in 1949 for the New York Sun series, "Crime on the Waterfront," which was the basis for the Academy Award-winning film, On the Waterfront.

He was the author or editor of sixteen books, five of them best-sellers, including his most recent work, co-authored with Washington Post political reporter Dan Balz, The Battle for America: 2008. Johnson also was a regular commentator on the PBS television shows Washington Week in Review and The News Hour.

He held academic appointments at Duke University, Princeton University, University of California at Berkeley, the University of Pennsylvania and George Washington University and served as the Knight chair of public affairs journalism at the University of Maryland from 1998 until 2013.

== Personal life ==
He married Julia Ann Erwin in 1954; they had five children, and later divorced. In 2002, he married Kathryn Oberly.

=== Death ===
On May 24, 2013, he died of a heart attack in Bethesda, Maryland. Johnson's survivors include his wife, Kathryn A. Oberly, a former associate judge on the District of Columbia Court of Appeals, and three daughters and two sons from his previous marriage, to Julia Erwin.

Dan Balz, senior political reporter at the Washington Post, paid tribute to Johnson's reporting skills: "I don't say this lightly. He was a great journalist." Professor and noted former editor of The Philadelphia Inquirer and The New York Times Gene Roberts observed “He made his subjects come alive,” adding that “His writing had a flow and a polish.”

Former advisor to Presidents Bill Clinton and Barack Obama, former Chicago Tribune political writer and current NBC News senior political analyst David Axelrod stated: "When I was a young political reporter, Haynes Johnson was one of the great, iconic journalists we all aspired to be. May he rest in peace." University of Maryland President Wallace Loh said of Johnson: "He helped anchor a new generation of journalists."

Johnson was scheduled to be inducted into the Society of Professional Journalists Washington DC chapter's hall of fame in June, 2013.

== Bibliography ==
External videos
- Booknotes interview with Johnson on Sleepwalking Through History, March 3, 1991, C-SPAN
- Conversations with History, interview with Johnson on The Best of Times. University of California Television, January 13, 2003.
- Revelle Forum, a reading from Johnson’s book The Age of Anxiety. University of California Television, November 28, 2005.
- Conversations with History, interview with Johnson on The Age of Anxiety. University of California Television, December 5, 2005.

- Dusk at the Mountain (1963)
- The Bay of Pigs: The Leaders' Story of Brigade 2506 (1964)
- Fulbright: The Dissenter, with Bernard M. Gwertzman (1968)
- Army in Anguish, with George C. Wilson (1972)
- The Unions, with Nick Kotz (1972)
- Lyndon, with Richard Harwood (1973)
- The Fall of a President, editor (1974)
- The Working White House (1975)
- In the Absence of Power: Governing America (1980)
- The Landing: A Novel of Washington and World War II, with Howard Simons (1986)
- Sleepwalking Through History: America in the Reagan Years (1991)
- Divided We Fall (1994)
- The System: The American Way of Politics at the Breaking Point, with David Broder (1996)
- The Best of Times: America in the Clinton Years (2001)
- The Age of Anxiety: McCarthyism to Terrorism (2005)
- The Battle for America 2008: The Story of an Extraordinary Election with Dan Balz (2009)
- Herblock: The Life and Work of the Great Political Cartoonist with Harry Katz (2009)
