= James Crowell =

American judge (born 1973)

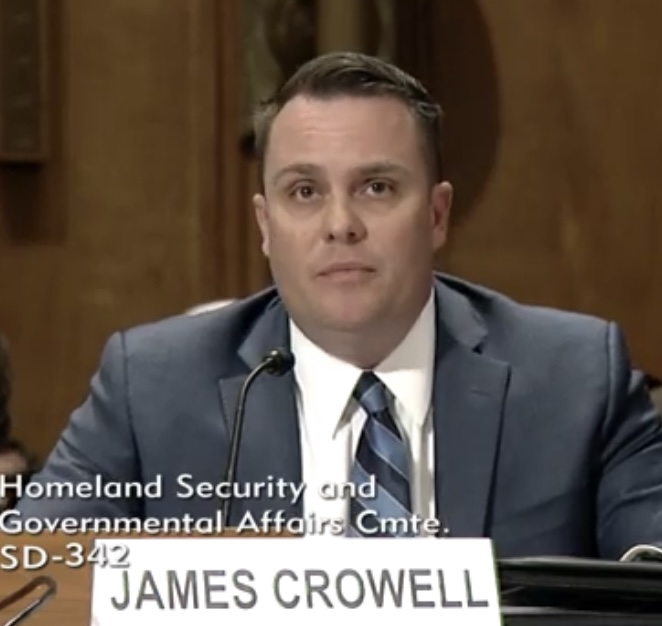

Associate Judge of the District of Columbia Court of Appeals
- Incumbent
- Assumed office August 26, 2026
- Appointed by: Donald Trump
- Preceded by: Kathryn A. Oberly

Associate Judge of the District of Columbia Superior Court
- In office August 2019 – August 26, 2026
- President: Donald Trump
- Preceded by: Brian Holeman
- Succeeded by: Vacant

Principal Associate Deputy Attorney General
- In office January 2017 – June 2017
- President: Donald Trump
- Preceded by: Matthew S. Axelrod
- Succeeded by: Robert Hur

Personal details
- Born: James Andrew Crowell IV; December 24, 1973 (age 52) Metairie, Louisiana, U.S.
- Education: Hampden-Sydney College (BA); Boston University (JD)

Military service
- Allegiance: United States
- Branch/service: United States Army
- Years of service: 1994–present
- Rank: Lieutenant Colonel (2018–present)
- Unit: United States Army Reserve

James Andrew Crowell IV (born December 24, 1973) is an associate judge of the Superior Court of the District of Columbia. In January 2019, Crowell was nominated by President Donald Trump to a 15-year term as an associate judge on the Superior Court of the District of Columbia. He was confirmed by the U.S. Senate on August 1, 2019. His official investiture ceremony took place on January 31, 2020. On June 15, 2026, President Trump nominated Crowell to a 15-year term as an associate judge on the Court of Appeals for the District of Columbia.

Crowell received his Bachelor of Arts from Hampden–Sydney College and his Juris Doctor from the Boston University School of Law. After law school, he clerked for Charles A. Pannell Jr. of the United States District Court for the Northern District of Georgia.

Prior to becoming a judge, Crowell served as a federal prosecutor for 16 years, where he prosecuted cases involving national security, fraud, corruption, violent crime, and illegal narcotics. Immediately prior to his nomination as a judge, he was director of the Executive Office for United States Attorneys. Prior to serving as director, Crowell served in the Office of the Deputy Attorney General as principal associate deputy attorney general, chief of staff, and associate deputy attorney general. Crowell has served in the United States Army Reserve since 1994.

Legal offices
Preceded by Kathryn A. Oberly	Associate Judge of the District of Columbia Court of Appeals; 2026–present	Incumbent
