= H. Marshall Jarrett =

American government official and lawyer (born 1944/1945)

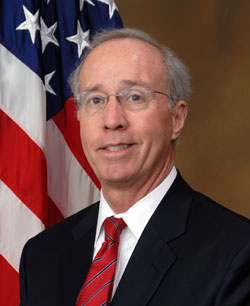
- Jarrett c. 2010

Director of the Executive Office for United States Attorneys
- In office April 2009 – March 2014
- Preceded by: Kenneth E. Melson
- Succeeded by: Monty Wilkinson

Director of the Office of Professional Responsibility
- In office May 1998 – April 2009
- Preceded by: Michael Shaheen
- Succeeded by: Robin Ashton

Personal details
- Born: 1944 or 1945 (age 79–80)
- Education: West Virginia University; West Virginia University College of Law

H. Marshall Jarrett (born 1944 or 1945) is an American government official and lawyer who served as chief counsel and director of the Office of Professional Responsibility (OPR) of the United States Department of Justice (DOJ) from 1998 to 2009 and as director of the Executive Office for U.S. Attorneys (EOUSA) from 2009 to 2014.

== Early life and education ==
Jarrett was born in 1944 or 1945.

He graduated West Virginia University and the West Virginia University College of Law.

== Career ==
In 1975, Jarrett began his career in government service when he joined the U.S. Attorney's office for the Southern District of West Virginia as a trial attorney, where he later became chief of the office's criminal division and first assistant U.S. Attorney.

He then briefly served as deputy director of the Enforcement Division of the Commodity Futures Trading Commission before joining DOJ's Public Integrity Section in 1980.

While in the Public Integrity Section, Jarrett prosecuted the chairman of the Kentucky Democratic Party for insurance mail fraud, a Mississippi sheriff for drug trafficking, and CIA agents for theft of government funds.

In 1988, Jarrett became chief of the criminal division of the U.S. Attorney's office for the District of Columbia under U.S. Attorney Jay B. Stephens. There he supervised the prosecutions of drug trafficker Rayful Edmond, U.S. Representative Dan Rostenkowski, D.C. Mayor Marion Barry, as well as a group of twelve corrupt D.C. Metropolitan Police officers.

In July 1997, Jarrett became an associate deputy attorney general.

On May 21, 1998, U.S. Attorney General Janet Reno announced Jarrett's appointment as the chief counsel and director of DOJ's Office of Professional Responsibility (OPR).

While heading OPR, Jarrett sought to investigate DOJ's approval for the National Security Agency's domestic wiretapping program in 2006, but requisite security clearances were denied by the Bush administration.

On February 22, 2008, Jarrett announced an investigation of DOJ legal memoranda by John Yoo, Jay Bybee, Steven G. Bradbury, and others justifying waterboarding and other harsh interrogation techniques. On February 19, 2010, Associate Deputy Attorney General David Margolis issued a memorandum for the attorney general in which he refused both to adopt the OPR's findings of misconduct and to authorize the OPR to recommend to state bar authorities disciplinary actions against Yoo and Bybee.

On April 8, 2009, U.S. Attorney General Eric Holder appointed Jarrett to head the Executive Office for United States Attorneys (EOUSA).

Jarrett retired from his post at EOUSA on March 31, 2014.
