= Michael Shaheen =

American government official and lawyer (1940–2007)

Director of the Office of Professional Responsibility
- In office December 8, 1975 – December 30, 1997
- Appointed by: Edward H. Levi
- Preceded by: Position established
- Succeeded by: H. Marshall Jarrett

Mayor of Como
- In office May 1970 – January 1973

Personal details
- Born: Michael Edmund Shaheen Jr. August 5, 1940 Boston, Massachusetts, U.S.
- Died: November 29, 2007 (aged 67) Falls Church, Virginia, U.S.
- Spouse: Polly Dammann (m. 1976)
- Children: 3
- Education: Taft School; Davenport College; Vanderbilt University Law School

Michael Edmund Shaheen Jr. (August 5, 1940 – November 29, 2007) was an American government official and lawyer who served as the first director of the United States Department of Justice's Office of Professional Responsibility (OPR) from 1975 to 1997. While director of OPR, Shaheen led inquiries into government officials under five presidents, including multiple U.S. Attorneys General, in some cases leading to their removal or resignation.

== Early life and education ==
Shaheen was born on August 5, 1940, in Boston, Massachusetts, to Dorothy Wallace Cameron Shaheen and Michael E. Shaheen, a physician. At age 5, Shaheen moved to Como, Mississippi.

He lived in Como until attending the Taft School in Watertown, Connecticut, in preparation for his undergraduate studies at Yale's Davenport College, where he was a political science major and graduated in 1962. Shaheen obtained his law degree from Vanderbilt University Law School in 1965.

== Career ==
Shaheen started his law career by clerking for a federal judge in Tennessee, after which he practiced as a lawyer in his hometown of Como, Mississippi, where he also served as mayor from May 1970 to January 1973. He later practiced law in Memphis, Tennessee.

In 1973, Shaheen joined the United States Department of Justice (DOJ) where he worked in the department's Civil Rights Division for two years before becoming United States Attorney General Edward H. Levi's special counsel for intelligence.

On December 8, 1975, based on Shaheen's suggestions, Levi created DOJ's Office of Professional Responsibility (OPR) and named Shaheen as its first director.

In 1976, Shaheen and fellow DOJ attorney John M. Dowd recommended action be taken against then-FBI Director Clarence Kelley in relation to gifts received by Kelley from subordinates, with Dowd recommending Kelley be removed from his post and Shaheen recommending he be reprimanded. Ultimately, neither suggestion was accepted by Attorney General Levi or President Ford, leaving Kelley in office.

In 1978, Shaheen and his office released a report detailing the abuse of power by former FBI Director J. Edgar Hoover, who had misused the FBI's resources for personal gain.

In 1980, Shaheen investigated President Jimmy Carter's brother Billy Carter in regards to his status as a registered foreign agent for the government of Libyan leader Muammar Gaddafi.

In 1982, Shaheen found that the office of then-United States Attorney for the District of Columbia Stanley S. Harris was justified in withholding the name of a source who had prompted the U.S. Attorney's office to launch an investigation into a deputy chief of the Metropolitan Police Department of the District of Columbia. The source's allegations could not be substantiated by the federal prosecutors, leading to the Washington Metropolitan Police Officials Association asking then-Attorney General William French Smith to force prosecutors to reveal the source. Shaheen found that "the entire matter appears to have been handled in a highly professional and discreet fashion", also commenting that sources must feel safe in telling prosecutors about potential criminal activity.

The same year, Shaheen concluded that Attorney General Smith had acted inappropriately when he invested in two tax shelters and by accepting a $50,000 severance payment from a steel company. Smith returned the money and pledged to limit his deductions from the tax shelter to the amount of cash invested, steps Shaheen found to be "sufficient [...] to cure the substance" of the violation.

In 1989, Shaheen found that former U.S. Attorney General Edwin Meese had failed to report nearly $20,000 in capital gains on his 1985 tax return. His report called this "conduct which should not be tolerated of any government employee". By the time Shaheen's report was published, Meese had resigned as a result of the Wedtech scandal.

In 1993, Shaheen's office, as the result of a six-month investigation, released a report accusing then-Director of the FBI William S. Sessions of misuse of government property, leading to Sessions' dismissal by then-President Bill Clinton.

From 1993 to 1995, Shaheen's office was investigating the firing of several employees from the White House travel office in May 1993. In 1995 testimony before the House Government Reform and Oversight Committee, Shaheen complained about the Clinton White House's failure to cooperate with his investigation after the White House had failed to turn over certain documents for two years. He ultimately concluded that Clinton aides had taken "ill-advised and erroneous actions."

Shaheen took an early retirement option from DOJ and left his post on December 30, 1997, having served as director of the Office of Professional Responsibility under eight attorneys general for 22 years, leaving him as the longest serving director of OPR as of 2024.

After his retirement from DOJ, Shaheen was chief counsel and deputy executive director of the Commission on the Advancement of Federal Law Enforcement.

== Death ==
Shaheen died of pancreatic cancer on November 29, 2007, at his home in Falls Church, Virginia. He was survived by his wife, three sons, and three grandchildren.

== Personal life ==
On September 11, 1976, Shaheen married Polly Dammann, a lawyer in the United States Department of Justice's Civil Division. Together, they had three sons.

Political offices
New office	Director of the Office of Professional Responsibility; 1975–1997	Succeeded by H. Marshall Jarrett
