= Shelby Highsmith =

American judge (1929–2015)

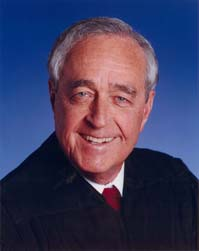

Senior Judge of the United States District Court for the Southern District of Florida
- In office March 15, 2002 – December 2, 2015

Judge of the United States District Court for the Southern District of Florida
- In office September 16, 1991 – March 15, 2002
- Appointed by: George H. W. Bush
- Preceded by: Thomas Scott
- Succeeded by: Cecilia Altonaga

Personal details
- Born: Shelby Highsmith; January 31, 1929 Jacksonville, Florida
- Died: December 2, 2015 (aged 86) Fort Belvoir, Virginia
- Education: Georgia Military College (AA); University of Kansas (BA); University of Missouri–Kansas City; School of Law (LLB)

Shelby Highsmith (January 31, 1929 – December 2, 2015) was an American lawyer and a United States district judge of the United States District Court for the Southern District of Florida.

== Education and career ==
Highsmith was born on January 31, 1929, in Jacksonville, Florida. He graduated from Georgia Military College with an Associate of Arts degree in 1949. He served in the United States Army from 1949 to 1955. Highsmith graduated from the University of Kansas with a Bachelor of Arts degree in 1958 and from the University of Missouri–Kansas City School of Law with a Bachelor of Laws in 1958. Highsmith was in private practice in Kansas City, Missouri, from 1958 to 1959, before relocating to Florida and entering private practice in Miami from 1959 to 1970. Highsmith served as chief legal advisor to the Governor's War on Crime Program from 1967 to 1968 and special counsel for the Florida Racing Commission from 1969 to 1970. Highsmith was a member of the Law Enforcement Planning Counsel of Florida from 1969 to 1970 and served as a circuit judge for the 11th Judicial Circuit (Dade County) from 1970 to 1975. Highsmith resumed private practice in Miami in 1975.

== Federal judicial service ==
On June 27, 1991, President George H. W. Bush nominated Highsmith to the United States District Court for the Southern District of Florida, to the seat vacated by Judge Thomas Scott. Confirmed by the Senate on September 12, 1991, he received his commission on September 16, 1991. Highsmith assumed senior status on March 15, 2002, but stopped hearing cases in 2008. He died on December 2, 2015, at his family's home in Fort Belvoir, Virginia, from the effects of Alzheimer's disease.

Legal offices
Preceded by Thomas Scott	Judge of the United States District Court for the Southern District of Florida; 1991–2002	Succeeded by Cecilia Altonaga
