= Mount Saint Joseph Academy (Buffalo, New York) =

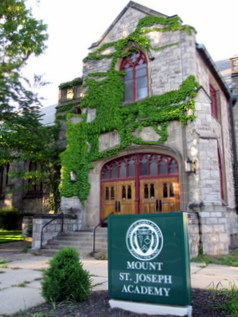

Information
- Established: 1891
- Closed: 2010

Mount Saint Joseph Academy (MSJA) was a Roman Catholic school located in Buffalo, New York. It closed at the end of the 2009–10 school year.

== History ==
Mount Saint Joseph Academy was founded by the Sisters of St. Joseph in 1891 as a K–12 boarding school for girls. In the 1970s MSJA began admitting boys, becoming a coeducational institution. In 1987, the high school portion of MSJA was closed due to declining enrollment. This did not solve MSJA's financial difficulties, and in 2005 the Sisters of St. Joseph announced that they would be closing the school. Parents, however, organized the Committee to Save M.S.J.A., and successfully reestablished MSJA as an independent Catholic school offering classes for pre-K to eighth grade students. For the 2007–8 school year, MSJA moved from the Canisius College campus to the former site of Central Presbyterian Church (Buffalo, New York) at 15 Jewett Parkway (northwest corner of Jewett Ave. and Main Street). Mounting operational difficulties and continuing declines in enrollment—from 125 students at the time of the move in 2007–8 to 88 students in 2009-10—led to closure of the school after the 2009-10 school year.

The final site of MSJA was in Buffalo's Parkside Neighborhood, a short walk from Frank Lloyd Wright's historic Darwin Martin House, and less than a half-mile from Frederick Law Olmsted's Delaware Park.
