= Executive Office for United States Attorneys =

Office of the US Department of Justice

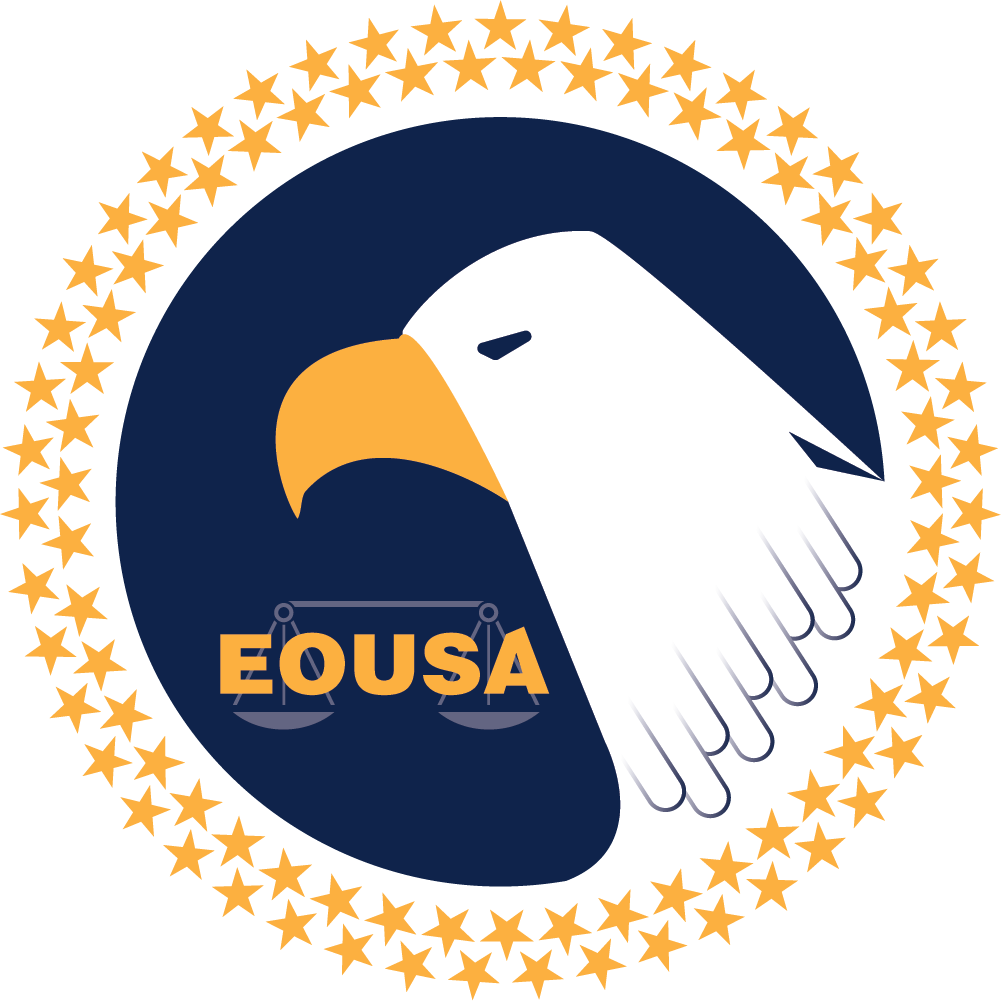

Agency overview
- Formed: April 6, 1953; 73 years ago
- Headquarters: 950 Pennsylvania Avenue NW, Room 2242, Washington, DC 20530-0001, USA; 38.894080°N 77.024894°W
- Agency executive: Francey Hakes, Director
- Website: www.justice.gov/usao/eousa

The Executive Office for United States Attorneys (EOUSA) is the office within the Department of Justice that provides executive and administrative support for the 93 United States attorneys located throughout the 50 states, District of Columbia, Guam, the Northern Mariana Islands, Puerto Rico, and the U.S. Virgin Islands. Such support includes, but is not limited to, legal education, administrative oversight, technical support, and the creation of uniform policies. The organization of the EOUSA is laid out in Title 3 of the Justice Manual., which is provided by the United States Department of Justice.

== History ==
The Executive Office for United States Attorneys was created on April 6, 1953 by Attorney General Order No. 8-53, issued by then-attorney general Herbert Brownell, Jr. The office, created as a part of the Office of the Deputy Attorney General, was to provide for close liaison between the Department of Justice in Washington, DC and the 93 U.S. Attorneys (USAs) throughout the 50 states, the (Panama) Canal Zone (Until March 31, 1982), the District of Columbia, Guam, the Northern Mariana Islands, Puerto Rico, and the U.S. Virgin Islands. It was organized by James R. Browning, who also served as the office’s first chief. Browning would later become a federal circuit judge on the U.S. Court of Appeals for the Ninth Circuit.

The Attorney General’s Advisory Committee of United States Attorneys (AGAC), was created on February 13, 1976 by then-attorney general Elliot Richardson to advise the Attorney General and give U.S. Attorneys a say in Department of Justice policies. Members of the Committee are selected by the Attorney General to serve on a rotating basis.,

== Executive Office for United States Attorneys Director ==
The EOUSA is under the direction of a director. The EOUSA director provides general executive assistance and supervision to all U.S. Attorney’s offices, including:

- Evaluating the performance of all U.S. Attorney offices, making appropriate reports and inspections, and taking corrective action when indicated.
- Coordinating and directing the relationship of the U.S. Attorney offices with other organizational units of the Department of Justice.
- Publishing and maintaining a U.S. Attorneys’ Manual and a United States Attorneys’ Bulletin for the internal guidance of the U.S. Attorneys’ offices and those other organizational units of the Department concerned with litigation.
- Supervising the operation of the Office of Legal Education, the Attorney General’s Advocacy Institute and the Legal Education Institute, which authorizes, develops, and conducts the training of all federal legal personnel.
- Providing the Attorney General’s Advisory Committee of United States Attorneys with such staff assistance and funds as are reasonably necessary to carry out the Committee’s responsibilities.
- Establishing policy and procedures for the satisfaction, collection, or recovery of criminal fines, special assessments, penalties, interest, bail bond forfeitures, restitution, and court costs in criminal cases consistent with 28 CFR 0.171 in the Code of Federal Regulations.

The current director of the EOUSA is Francey Hakes. She was appointed EOUSA Director on July 10, 2025.

== Directors of the Executive Office for United States Attorneys ==
Director	Years served	Notes
Francey Hakes	2025–present	
Stephanie M. Hinds	2024–2025	
Norman Wong	2023–2024	Acting Director
Monty Wilinson	2021–2023	
Corey F. Ellis	2019–2021	
James Crowell	2017–2019	
Monty Wilkinson	2014–2017	
H. Marshall Jarrett	2009–2014	
Kenneth E. Melson	2007–2009	
Michael A. Battle	2005–2007	
Mary Beth Buchanan	2004–2005	
Guy A. Lewis	2002–2004	
Kenneth Wainstein	2001–2002	
Mark T. Calloway	2000–2001	
Mary Murgua	1999–2000	
Donna Bucella	1997–1999	
Carol DiBattiste	1994–1997	
Anthony Moscato	1992–1994	
Laurence S. McWhorter	1987–1992	
William P. Tyson	1977–1987	
William B. Gray	1975–1977	
Gerald D. Fines	1975–1975	
Philip H. Modlin	1970–1975	
Harlington Wood, Jr.	1969–1970	
John K. Van de Kamp	1968–1969	
John W. Kern, III	1966–1968	
William J. Brady, Jr.	1963–1966	
John R. Reilly	1961–1963	
B. Hayden Crawford	1958–1960	
Joseph H. Lesh	1954–1958	The first head of the EOUSA
James R. Browning	1953–1954	Established the EOUSA

== Responsibilities ==
The Executive Office for United States Attorneys provides:

- Coordination between the United States Attorneys offices and other components of the Department of Justice and other federal agencies.
- General executive assistance and direction, including U.S. Attorney, Assistant U.S. Attorney and Special Assistant U.S. Attorney appointment support; direction and supervision of management and policy activities of U.S. Attorney financial litigation programs; general legal interpretation, opinion, and advice; budget and financial assistance; staff assistance and funds for committees such as the Attorney General’s Advisory Committee; and by serving as the liaison on Victim-Witness assistance activities done in U.S. Attorney offices.
- Policy development, including establishing and interpreting guidelines on criminal fine collection issues; providing information and guidance on important legislation, congressional oversight, and appropriations hearings; responding to inquiries from members of Congress and private citizens; and responding to requests under the Freedom of Information Act and the Privacy Act.
- Administration management and oversight, including providing support for programs in facilities management, support services, and security; evaluating U.S. Attorney performance; and publishing and maintaining a United States Justice Manual (previously known as the U.S. Attorney Manual, title formally changed in September 25, 2018) and United States Attorneys’ Bulletin for internal use.
- Organizes the annual EOUSA Director's Awards recognizing outstanding achievements and exemplary service from U.S. Attorneys' offices across the country. These awards are presented to legal and administrative staff and their law enforcement partners for such accomplishments as handling complex prosecutions, ensuring public safety, and upholding the rule of law. Awards are given for various categories, including "Superior Performance by a Litigative Team" and "Superior Performance in a Managerial or Supervisory Role," and are presented at an annual ceremony in Washington, D.C., by the EOUSA Director.
- Operational support for all U.S. Attorney offices, including designing and providing automated services and systems for office administrative and case management purposes; providing technical, strategic communications, and video telecommunications support; and promoting and monitoring programs with the U.S. Attorney offices and the Department of Justice, as designated by the Attorney General.

The EOUSA also supervises the operation of the Office of Legal Education, which develops, conducts, and assists in the training of all Department of Justice legal personnel and other federal legal personnel.

== Organization ==
The Office of the EOUSA Director serves as the focal point for a wide array of requests and inquiries from the United States Attorneys offices. The EOUSA Director is responsible for the overall supervision and management of all EOUSA staff to help provide support, guidance, assistance, and management to the 93 United States Attorneys.

- Director
  - Deputy Director and Counsel to the Director
    - Legal and Victims Programs
    - Data Integrity and Analysis
    - Strategic Communications
    - Evaluation and Review
  - Resource Management and Planning
  - Information Technology
  - Human Resources
  - Deputy Director
    - General Counsel
    - Freedom of Information Act (FOIA)/ Privacy Act (PA)
    - Equal Employment Opportunity and Diversity Management
    - Legal Education
