= Office of Professional Responsibility =

American Department of Justice office

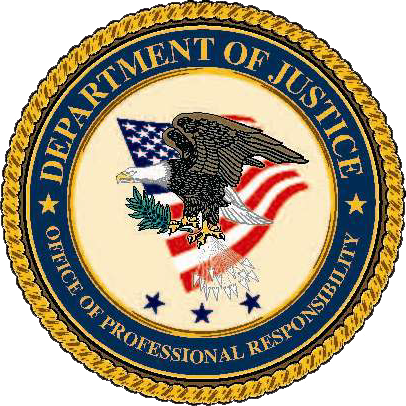
- Seal of the DOJ's Office of Professional Responsibility

Office overview
- Formed: December 8, 1975; 50 years ago
- Jurisdiction: Department of Justice
- Headquarters: Robert F. Kennedy Department of Justice Building 950 Pennsylvania Avenue NW Washington, D.C., United States; 38°53′35.52″N 77°1′30″W
- Office executive: Unknown, Director and Chief Counsel
- Parent department: Department of Justice
- Website: justice.gov/opr

The Office of Professional Responsibility (OPR), part of the United States Department of Justice (DOJ), is responsible for investigating lawyers employed by the DOJ who have been accused of misconduct or crime in the exercise of their professional functions.

== History ==
The OPR was established in 1975 by order of then attorney general Edward Levi, following revelations of ethical abuse and serious misconduct by senior DOJ officials during the Watergate scandal. The order directed OPR to "receive and review any information concerning conduct by a Department employee that may be in violation of law, regulations or orders, or applicable standards of conduct."

== Mission ==
OPR's primary mission is to ensure that DOJ attorneys perform their duties in accordance with professional standards.

The OPR promulgates independent standards of ethical and criminal conduct for DOJ attorneys, while the DOJ's Office of the Inspector General (OIG) has jurisdiction of non-attorney DOJ employees.

The OPR receives reports of allegations of misconduct made against DOJ attorneys from many sources. Nearly half of all such allegations are reported to OPR by DOJ sources, such as the attorney involved. The remaining complaints come from a variety of sources, including private attorneys, defendants and civil litigants, other federal agencies, state or local government officials, judicial and congressional referrals, and media reports. OPR gives expedited attention to judicial findings of misconduct.

The OPR reviews each allegation and determines whether further investigation is warranted. The determination is a matter of investigative judgment that weighs many factors, including the nature of the allegation, its apparent credibility, its specificity, its susceptibility to verification, and the source of the allegation. A decision to open a matter does not give rise to a presumption of misconduct, nor shift the burden of proof to the accused person. The OPR's investigations involve a wide range of allegations, and the investigative methods used vary accordingly.

In many cases, the OPR notifies the accused attorney and requests a written response. Sometimes, the OPR also makes on-site investigations. The OPR reports the results of the investigation to the component head concerned and to the Office of the Deputy Attorney General. The OPR also advises the complainant and the accused attorney of its conclusion.

== List of directors ==
No.	Director		Term		
No.	Portrait	Name	Took office	Left office	Term length
1	Michael Shaheen	Michael Shaheen	December 8, 1975	December 30, 1997	22 years, 22 days
–	Richard Rogers	Richard Rogers; Acting	December 30, 1997	May 21, 1998	142 days
2	H. Marshall Jarrett	H. Marshall Jarrett	May 21, 1998	April 8, 2009	10 years, 322 days
–	Mary Patrice Brown	Mary Patrice Brown; Acting	April 8, 2009	December 23, 2010	1 year, 259 days
3	Robin Ashton	Robin Ashton	December 23, 2010	September 2018	c. 7 years, 266 days
4	Corey Amundson	Corey Amundson	October 2, 2018	September 30, 2019	363 days
–	Jeffrey Ragsdale	Jeffrey Ragsdale; Acting	September 30, 2019	May 19, 2020	232 days
5	Jeffrey Ragsdale	Jeffrey Ragsdale	May 19, 2020	March 7, 2025	4 years, 292 days
—	Vacant	Vacant	March 7, 2025		1 year, 198 days

== See also ==
- McDade Amendment
