= Cecilia Altonaga =

American federal judge (born 1962)

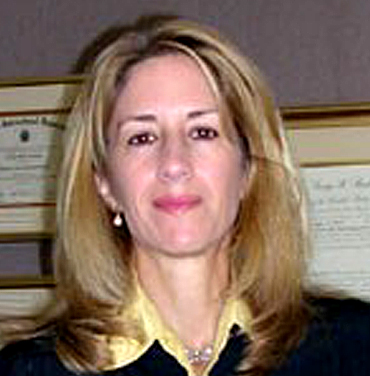

Chief Judge of the United States District Court for the Southern District of Florida
- Incumbent
- Assumed office July 1, 2021
- Preceded by: K. Michael Moore

Judge of the United States District Court for the Southern District of Florida
- Incumbent
- Assumed office May 7, 2003
- Appointed by: George W. Bush
- Preceded by: Shelby Highsmith

Personal details
- Born: Cecilia Maria Altonaga; December 26, 1962 (age 63) Baltimore, Maryland, U.S.
- Spouse: George Mencio
- Children: 3
- Education: Florida International University (BA); Yale University (JD)

Cecilia María Altonaga (born December 26, 1962) is an American lawyer and jurist serving as a United States district judge of the U.S. District Court for the Southern District of Florida. She was appointed in 2003 by President George W. Bush and is the first Cuban-American woman to be appointed as a chief judge and a federal judge in the United States.

== Biography ==
Altonaga was born in Baltimore, Maryland, to parents who escaped from the communist regime in Cuba. She attended Notre Dame Academy in Miami, graduating in 1980, and then received a Bachelor of Arts from Florida International University in 1983. Altonaga earned her Juris Doctor from Yale Law School in 1986. She worked as an attorney in the Miami Dade County Attorney's Office from 1986 to 1987, and then served as a law clerk to Edward B. Davis of the United States District Court for the Southern District of Florida from 1987 to 1988 before returning to the County Attorney's Office as an assistant County Attorney until 1996. In 1996, Governor Lawton Chiles appointed her as a County Court Judge on Florida's Eleventh Judicial Circuit Court. In 1999, she was elevated to circuit court judge in that district by Governor Jeb Bush.

== Federal judicial service ==
On January 15, 2003, President George W. Bush nominated Altonaga to be a United States district judge of the United States District Court for the Southern District of Florida. She was nominated to the seat vacated by Shelby Highsmith who assumed senior status on March 15, 2002. She was confirmed by the United States Senate on May 6, 2003, and received her commission the following day. During her time on the federal bench, Altonaga has been noted for her strong support of the recently created Florida International University College of Law, having served as the keynote speaker in the 2004 Convocation, judged several moot court competitions, and employed FIU law students as summer interns. She became chief judge on July 1, 2021.

=== Notable cases and rulings ===
On June 14, 2007, Altonaga ruled that US Sugar Corporation's practice of pumping untreated wastewater into Lake Okeechobee was in violation of the Clean Water Act. Largely as a result of this decision, on June 25, 2008 the state of Florida announced plans to purchase 300 square miles (780 km^{2}) of land controlled by US Sugar, which will be used to restore vital water flow between Lake Okeechobee and the Everglades National Park, helping to ensure its survival in the face of competition for water from surrounding development.

She also presided over the trial of Charles McArther Emmanuel, son of former Liberian dictator Charles Taylor, for torture.

In September 2006, Dubai Sheikh Mohammed bin Rashid Al Maktoum was accused of encouraging the abduction and enslavement of thousands of boys for use as jockeys in camel racing. A class action suit was filed in the state of Florida in the United States. In July 2007, Altonaga granted a motion to dismiss the suit because none of the involved parties resided in the United States.

In 2012, Altonaga disqualified the entire firm of Morgan & Morgan from a class action suit for "deplorable behavior" in connection with depositions for the case, including insisting on holding them in a Dunkin' Donuts, appearing dressed in t-shirt and shorts, bragging about playing Angry Birds during depositions, and drawing and then showing off "pictures of male genitalia".

On December 5, 2016, Altonaga rejected the U.S. Securities and Exchange Commission's $450,000 penalty against Michael Boudreaux, the City of Miami's budget director, for deceiving municipal bond investors, instead fining him $15,000.

In 2021, Altonaga was assigned to preside over the multidistrict litigation against stock trading company Robinhood, sued by its clients for suspending trading of GameStop stock during a national spike in the value of that stock.

In March 2024, Donald Trump filed a defamation lawsuit against ABC News and George Stephanopoulos for an airing of This Week, arguing that Stephanopoulos harmed Trump's reputation by claiming that Trump was found liable for raping the writer E. Jean Carroll in a New York case. Altonaga, presiding over the suit brought by Trump, denied a motion to dismiss by Stephanopoulos, finding that the technical definition used by the judge in the New York case did not examine the findings made by the jury.

=== Supreme Court speculation ===
In July 2005, following the retirement of Justice Sandra Day O'Connor, Altonaga's name was raised as a potential George W. Bush Supreme Court candidate, a position for which she was promoted by Florida's Hispanic community. However, it constitutes an extremely rare occurrence for a sitting District Court judge to be appointed to the Supreme Court, with the most recent occurrence being Edward Terry Sanford in 1923. At 43, Altonaga was younger than most other Hispanics or women who were being mentioned as possible nominees, which might have made her a more attractive choice to the President. President Bush went through several other nominees, and ultimately succeeded in nominating Judge Samuel Alito for the position.

== Personal life ==
Altonaga married attorney George Mencio in 1986. They have three daughters.

== See also ==
- George W. Bush Supreme Court candidates
- List of Hispanic and Latino American jurists
- List of first women lawyers and judges in Florida
- List of first women lawyers and judges in the United States

Legal offices
Preceded by Shelby Highsmith	Judge of the United States District Court for the Southern District of Florida; 2003–present	Incumbent
Preceded by K. Michael Moore	Chief Judge of the United States District Court for the Southern District of Florida; 2021–present	Incumbent
