= Wifredo A. Ferrer =

American lawyer (born 1966)

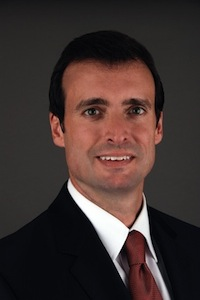

United States Attorney for the Southern District of Florida
- In office July 16, 2010 – March 3, 2017
- President: Barack Obama; Donald Trump
- Preceded by: Alexander Acosta
- Succeeded by: Ariana Fajardo Orshan

Personal details
- Born: 1966 (age 59–60) Hialeah, Florida
- Education: University of Miami, University of Pennsylvania

Wifredo A. "Willy" Ferrer (born 1966) is the former United States Attorney for the Southern District of Florida. He was nominated on February 24, 2010, by President Barack Obama and confirmed by the Senate on April 22, 2010. He was sworn in on July 16, 2010, in Miami, Florida. As United States Attorney, he was the chief federal law enforcement officer for the District. Ferrer is currently the Chair of Holland & Knight's Global Compliance and Investigations Team.

== Education ==
Ferrer earned a B.A. in Economics from the University of Miami in 1987. He then continued his education in law at the University of Pennsylvania, graduating cum laude in 1990.

== Early life and career ==
Ferrer was born in Hialeah, Florida in 1966, and attended Hialeah-Miami Lakes High School. After graduating law school in 1990, he clerked for then District Judge Stanley Marcus. Upon completing his clerkship in Fall 1991, he joined the Miami law firm of Steel, Hector & Davis where he remained for three years. Ferrer then returned to public service, first as a White House Fellow and Special Assistant to the Secretary of the U.S. Department of Housing and Urban Development (HUD), and later as Deputy Chief of Staff and Counsel to then Attorney General Janet Reno.

After five years at the Department of Justice, Ferrer returned to Miami in 2000 to become an Assistant United States Attorney. While at the United States Attorney's Office, he served in the Public Integrity and National Security Section, the Economic Crimes Section, the Major Crimes Section and the Appellate Division of the Office. As an Assistant United States Attorney, he handled and tried numerous high-profile matters, including international money laundering, health care fraud, narcotics, international human rights abuses, immigration and firearms offenses.

In 2006, Ferrer joined the Miami-Dade County Attorney's office, where he was an Assistant County Attorney and chief of the Federal Litigation Section.

In March 2017, Ferrer stepped down from his position as U.S. Attorney for the Southern District of Florida and joined the law firm of Holland & Knight in its Miami office as a partner and head of the firm's Global Compliance and Investigations Team.

During his career, Ferrer has been recognized as one of the Top Government Attorneys by both South Florida Legal Guide and Florida Legal Elite. In addition, he received the Attorney General's Medal in 2000, and Superior Performance and Special Merit Awards for his work as an Assistant U.S. Attorney.
