= Guy A. Lewis =

American lawyer

Director of the Executive Office for United States Attorneys
- In office 2002–2004
- President: George W. Bush
- Preceded by: Kenneth L. Wainstein
- Succeeded by: Mary Beth Buchanan

United States Attorney for the Southern District of Florida
- In office 2000–2002
- President: Bill Clinton; George W. Bush
- Preceded by: Thomas Scott
- Succeeded by: Marcos D. Jimenez

Personal details
- Education: University of Tennessee (BS); University of Memphis School of Law (JD)

Guy A. Lewis is the former United States Attorney for the Southern District of Florida, where he served from 2000 to 2002. He took over when Thomas Scott resigned. He was replaced by Marcos D. Jimenez. Lewis previously served as First Assistant U.S. Attorney from 1997 to 2000, Deputy Chief of the Narcotics Section from 1994 to 1997, and Assistant U.S. Attorney from 1988 to 1994. He was appointed Director of the Executive Office for United States Attorneys by Attorney General John Ashcroft in 2002. He served until 2004. From 2004 to 2005, he was a partner at Shook, Hardy & Bacon and since 2005, he has been a partner at Lewis Tein PL. Lewis graduated from Hixson High School in 1979, received a BS from the University of Tennessee in 1983 and his JD from University of Memphis School of Law in 1986. He was admitted into the bar on December 19, 1986. He previously served as a law clerk to Thomas Scott of the United States District Court for the Southern District of Florida and William Cowen of the United States Court of Appeals for the Federal Circuit.
