= Benamar Benatta =

Algerian refugee

Benamar "Ben" Benatta is an Algerian refugee claimant living in Canada. On September 12, 2001, the day following the September 11 attacks in 2001, Benatta was turned over to United States authorities by Canada border guards, and was held in detention for nearly five years despite having been cleared of suspicions of terrorist activities by the Federal Bureau of Investigation.

== Life ==
Benatta was a Lieutenant in the Algerian Air Force and was sent to the United States on a 6-month visa in December 2000 to attend training seminars in Baltimore at the military conglomerate Northrop Grumman as part of a military exchange program.

He did not return to Algeria at the end of the course, reporting that he feared for his life due to threats from terrorists and from the military. Between June 2001, when his visa expired, and September 2001 he lived in New York City with an Orthodox Jew as a roommate.

== Entry to Canada, arrest ==
On September 5, 2001, he travelled to Buffalo, where he crossed the Peace Bridge into Canada and applied for refugee status. He was detained by Canada border officials who declared him a person of interest and were apparently concerned about his mental health. Six days after his detention, the events of September 11, 2001, took place and that evening he was questioned by US security officials.

Canada immigration officials illegally transferred him over the border to US officials on September 12, 2001, and he was moved to a holding cell in upstate New York and then to a high-security detention centre in Brooklyn and then to one in Buffalo. He said he was kept in solitary confinement and alleged that he was tortured and humiliated while in US custody. He has reported that officials shackled his wrists and feet, tied his chest with a chain, and denied him sleep. He was not given access to a lawyer until late April 2002. In 2004, the United Nations Working Group on Arbitrary Detention said that the treatment of Benatta "could be described as torture" and found that his detention was arbitrary.

On November 15, 2001, American law enforcement officials determined that Benatta had no ties to terrorism. However, he remained in detention, as in December 2001, he was charged with carrying false identification papers, though he was not informed of the charges until April 2002, nor offered access to a lawyer. He was offered a plea bargain that would have meant a six-month sentence, and a fairly quick release, but decided to fight the charges: "I'm not a criminal. Never," Benatta said.

These charges were dropped in 2003 following a highly critical report by a U.S. federal magistrate who reproved federal prosecutors, the FBI and immigration agents, saying that they had used a "sham" to justify their actions in detaining Benatta, including ignoring legal deadlines designed to protect constitutional rights and providing explanations for their behaviour that "bordered on ridiculousness". "The defendant in this case undeniably was deprived of his liberty," the magistrate, Judge H. Kenneth Schroeder Jr. wrote, "and held in custody under harsh conditions which can be said to be oppressive." To detain Benatta longer "would be to join in the charade that has been perpetrated."

Benatta was transferred to immigration detention, where he continued to be detained as he went through a series of immigration reviews and appeals. On July 20, 2006 American officials handed Benatta back to Canadian immigration officials, following high-level negotiations between Canada and the U.S. which resulted in the Government of Canada offering him temporary residence while he sought refugee status. The Los Angeles Times reported that Benatta had been held for a total of 1,780 days, holding the distinction of being held without charge longer than any other suspect in the US.

The Los Angeles Times quoted Benatta:

I say to myself from time to time, maybe what happened ... it was some kind of dream. I never believed things like that could happen in the United States.

Benetta is living in Toronto while awaiting determination of his refugee claim. In April 2007, he sought an explanation from the Government of Canada about why he was transferred to the United States on September 12, 2001.

Michael A. Battle, the prosecutor involved in his incarceration, has since been promoted to "Director of the Executive Office for United States Attorneys".
