= Thomas Scott (Florida judge) =

American judge (born 1948)

Thomas Emerson Scott Jr.

United States Attorney for the Southern District of Florida
- In office August 1997 – May 2000
- Appointed by: Bill Clinton
- Preceded by: Kendall Coffey
- Succeeded by: Guy A. Lewis (acting)

Judge of the United States District Court for the Southern District of Florida
- In office July 18, 1985 – October 31, 1990
- Appointed by: Ronald Reagan
- Preceded by: Seat established by 98 Stat. 333
- Succeeded by: Shelby Highsmith

Circuit Judge for the Eleventh Judicial Circuit Court of Florida
- In office 1980–1984

Personal details
- Born: Thomas Emerson Scott Jr. April 27, 1948 (age 78) Pittsburgh, Pennsylvania
- Spouse: Joyce Newman
- Education: University of Miami (B.A.); University of Miami School of Law (J.D.)

Thomas Emerson Scott Jr. (born April 27, 1948) is a former United States district judge of the United States District Court for the Southern District of Florida. He is currently an attorney in private practice.

== Education and career ==
Scott was born in Pittsburgh, Pennsylvania. He received a Bachelor of Arts degree from the University of Miami in 1969. He received a Juris Doctor from the University of Miami School of Law in 1972. He received a Master of Laws from the University of Virginia School of Law in 1989. He was in the United States Army as a First Lieutenant in 1969. He was in private practice of law in Miami, Florida from 1972 to 1976. He was in private practice of law in Fort Lauderdale, Florida from 1976 to 1977. He was in private practice of law in Miami from 1977 to 1979. He was a Judge of the Circuit Court of Florida in Miami from 1980 to 1984. He was in private practice of law in Fort Lauderdale from 1984 to 1985.

He was an instructor at the University of Miami in Coral Gables, Florida from 1984 to 1986.

== Federal judicial service ==
Scott was nominated by President Ronald Reagan on June 20, 1985, to the United States District Court for the Southern District of Florida, to a new seat created by 98 Stat. 333. He was confirmed by the United States Senate on July 16, 1985, and received commission on July 18, 1985. His service was terminated on October 31, 1990, due to resignation.

== Post judicial service ==
Following his resignation from the federal bench, Scott resumed private practice in Miami. From 1997 to 2000, he served as the United States Attorney for the Southern District of Florida, having been appointed by President Bill Clinton. He then returned to private practice in Miami. He is currently a named partner at the law firm of Cole, Scott & Kissane, P.A., in Miami.

== Sources ==
Legal offices
Preceded by Seat established by 98 Stat. 333	Judge of the United States District Court for the Southern District of Florida; 1985–1990	Succeeded by Shelby Highsmith
