= Michael A. Battle (attorney) =

American lawyer (born 1955)

Michael Battle
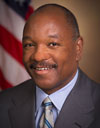

Director of the Executive Office for United States Attorneys
- In office June 6, 2005 – March 16, 2007
- President: George W. Bush

United States Attorney for the Western District of New York
- In office January 2002 – May 2005
- President: George W. Bush
- Preceded by: Denise O'Donnell
- Succeeded by: Terrance P. Flynn

Personal details
- Born: October 15, 1955 (age 69); New York City, U.S.
- Education: Ithaca College (BA); University at Buffalo (JD)

Michael A. Battle (born October 15, 1955) is an American attorney who served as the director of the Executive Office for United States Attorneys in the United States Department of Justice until he resigned, effective March 16, 2007. He was the person who informed seven United States Attorneys on December 7, 2006, that they were being dismissed.

== Early life and education ==
Battle was born and raised in New York City. He earned a Bachelor of Arts degree from Ithaca College in 1977 and a Juris Doctor from the University at Buffalo Law School in 1981.

== Career ==
From 1985 to 1992, he was an assistant U.S. attorney in Buffalo, New York, where he served in the General Criminal Division, the Civil Division, and on the Organized Crime and Drug Enforcement Task Force. Following his admission to the New York bar, he worked as a staff attorney with the Legal Aid Society Civil Division. In 1992, he helped to establish the Rochester and Buffalo Federal Public Defender's Offices, where he served until 1995. In June 1996, he was appointed by Governor George Pataki to serve as a judge on the Erie County, New York Family Court and was elected the following November to a full 10-year term. From 1995 to 1996, he served as assistant in charge of the Buffalo office of the New York State Attorney General.

From January 2002 to May 2005, Battle served as United States attorney for the Western District of New York.

=== Benamar Benatta ===
During his time as U.S. Attorney for the Western District of New York, Battle was responsible for the case of Benamar Benatta. Benatta was held without trial for five years following his forcible rendition from Canada on September 12, 2001. That November, the FBI concluded that Benatta was innocent; however, according to federal Magistrate Judge H. Kenneth Schroeder Jr, Battle then conspired with the FBI and immigration agents in a "sham" to make it appear that Benatta was being held for immigration violations.

In October 2003, when Battle announced he was dropping charges, a Buffalo reporter asked whether he planned to apologize to Benatta. Battle responded, "I'm not going to address that." Benatta was finally released in 2006, five years after having been cleared in November 2001.

Battle was then promoted by the White House. The Los Angeles Times reported that Benatta had been held for a total of 1,780 days, which gave him the distinction of being held on jail without charge longer than any other suspect in the U.S.

=== Executive Office for the United States Attorneys ===
Battle began his service as director of the Executive Office for United States Attorneys (EOUSA) at the United States Department of Justice on June 6, 2005. He was involved the dismissal of U.S. attorneys controversy, as he was the Justice Department official who, on December 7, 2006, informed seven U.S. attorneys that they were being dismissed. Just as publicity was heating up, and Congress began issuing subpoenas, he resigned on March 5, 2007, effective March 16.

=== Private practice ===
Battle is a senior partner at Schlam Stone & Dolan LLP in New York, focusing on commercial litigation, white-collar criminal defense, and appeals.
