= Ariana Fajardo Orshan =

American lawyer and judge

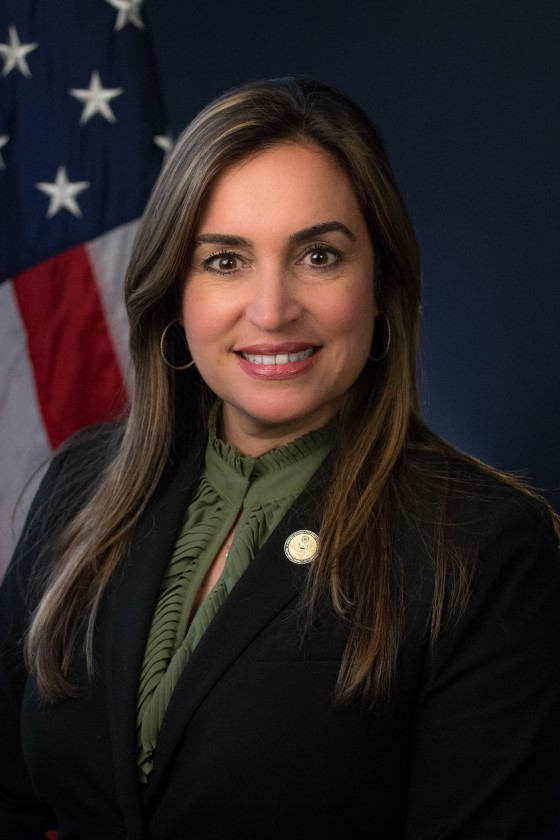

Judge of the Eleventh Judicial Circuit Court of Florida
- Incumbent
- Assumed office September 20, 2021
- Appointed by: Ron DeSantis
- Preceded by: Rosa C. Figarola

United States Attorney for the Southern District of Florida
- In office September 18, 2018 – March 26, 2021
- President: Donald Trump; Joe Biden
- Preceded by: Wifredo A. Ferrer
- Succeeded by: Juan Antonio Gonzalez (acting); Markenzy Lapointe

Judge of the Eleventh Judicial Circuit Court of Florida
- In office April 25, 2012 – September 17, 2018
- Appointed by: Rick Scott
- Preceded by: Julio Jimenez
- Succeeded by: Scott Bernstein

Personal details
- Education: Florida International University (BS); Shepard Broad Law Center (JD)

Ariana Fajardo Orshan is an American Judge of the Eleventh Judicial Circuit Court of Florida. She previously served as the United States Attorney for the Southern District of Florida from 2018 to 2021. Prior to this, she had been a Judge of the Eleventh Judicial Circuit Court of Florida from 2012 to 2018.

== Education ==
Fajardo Orshan earned her Bachelor of Science from Florida International University in 1993 and her Juris Doctor from Nova Southeastern University Shepard Broad Law Center in 1996.

== Legal career ==
Fajardo Orshan began her legal career as an Assistant State Attorney in Miami-Dade County, where she prosecuted a wide variety of crimes specializing in narcotics and organized crime. She then was a partner in a boutique law firm where she specialized in litigation.

== State judicial career ==
Prior to becoming a U.S. Attorney, Fajardo Orshan was a Circuit Court Judge of the Eleventh Judicial Circuit of Florida and an adjunct professor at Florida International University College of Law. She was appointed to the bench in 2012 by Governor Rick Scott.

After her term as a United States Attorney ended, she was reappointed to the Eleventh Judicial Circuit by Governor Ron DeSantis.

== U.S. Attorney ==
On June 7, 2018, President Trump announced his intent to nominate Fajardo Orshan to serve as a United States Attorney for the Southern District of Florida. On June 11, 2018, her nomination was sent to the Senate. On August 23, 2018, her nomination was reported out of committee by a voice vote. On August 28, 2018, her nomination was confirmed in the United States Senate by voice vote. Upon confirmation she became the first woman to ever be the United States Attorney in Southern Florida. Fajardo Orshan was sworn into office on September 18, 2018.

On February 8, 2021, she along with 55 other Trump-era attorneys were asked to resign. She resigned on March 26, 2021.

== Personal ==
Fajardo Orshan is married to Robert D. Orshan and has one son.

Legal offices
Preceded by Julio Jimenez	Judge of the Eleventh Judicial Circuit Court of Florida; 2012–2018	Succeeded by Scott Bernstein
