= Jason Reding Quiñones =

American lawyer

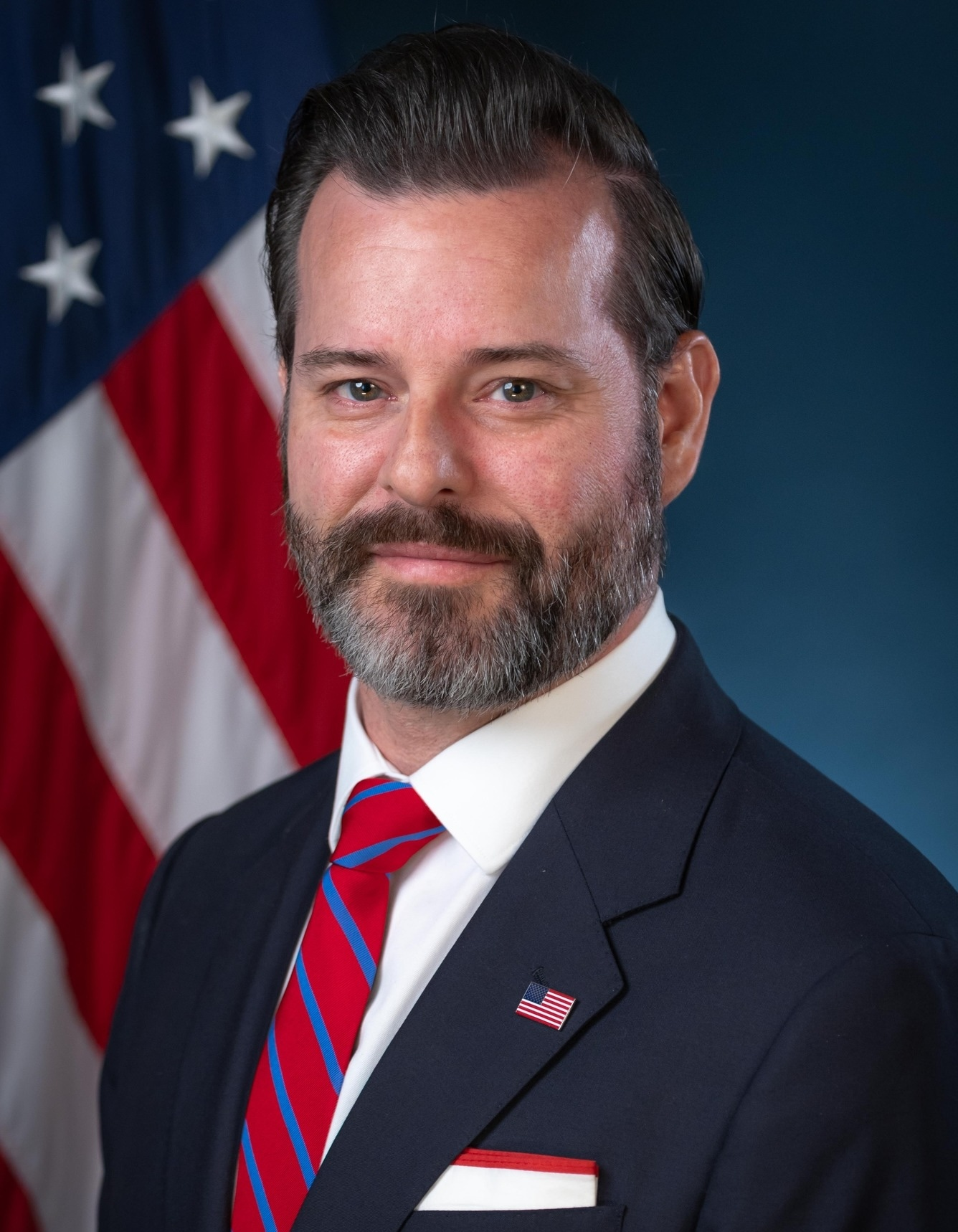
- Official portrait, 2025

United States Attorney for the Southern District of Florida
- In office August 13, 2025 – November 6, 2026
- President: Donald Trump
- Preceded by: Hayden O’Byrne (interim)
- Succeeded by: Yara Lorenzo Klukas (acting)

Judge of the Miami-Dade County Court in the Eleventh Judicial Circuit of Florida
- In office February 2024 – August 13, 2025
- Appointed by: Governor Ron DeSantis

Personal details
- Education: University of Florida (BA); Florida International University (JD)

Military service
- Allegiance: United States
- Branch/service: U.S. Army and U.S. Air Force
- Years of service: 2003–present
- Rank: Colonel
- Awards: Defense Meritorious Service Medal, Meritorious Service Medal, Joint Commendation Medal, Air Force Commendation Medal, Army Commendation Medal, and Global War on Terrorism Expeditionary Medal

Jason Reding Quiñones is an American lawyer, former trial judge, and military officer who served as the United States Attorney for the Southern District of Florida from 2025 to 2026. He was the first U.S. Attorney to be confirmed by the Senate in the second Trump administration.

== Early life ==
Reding Quiñones is the son of a Cuban political refugee. He received his bachelor's degree from the University of Florida and his Juris Doctor degree from the Florida International University College of Law in 2008. He began going by Reding Quiñones when he began seeking state judicial appointments.

== Military Service ==
Reding Quiñones has served in the U.S. Army and U.S. Air Force. His military service spans over two decades serving as cavalry scout, infantry officer, logistics officer, and judge advocate (military lawyer). On April 1, 2026, Reding Quiñones was promoted to Colonel. He currently serves as the senior reserve legal advisor to the Staff Judge Advocate at the United States Central Command (USCENTCOM).

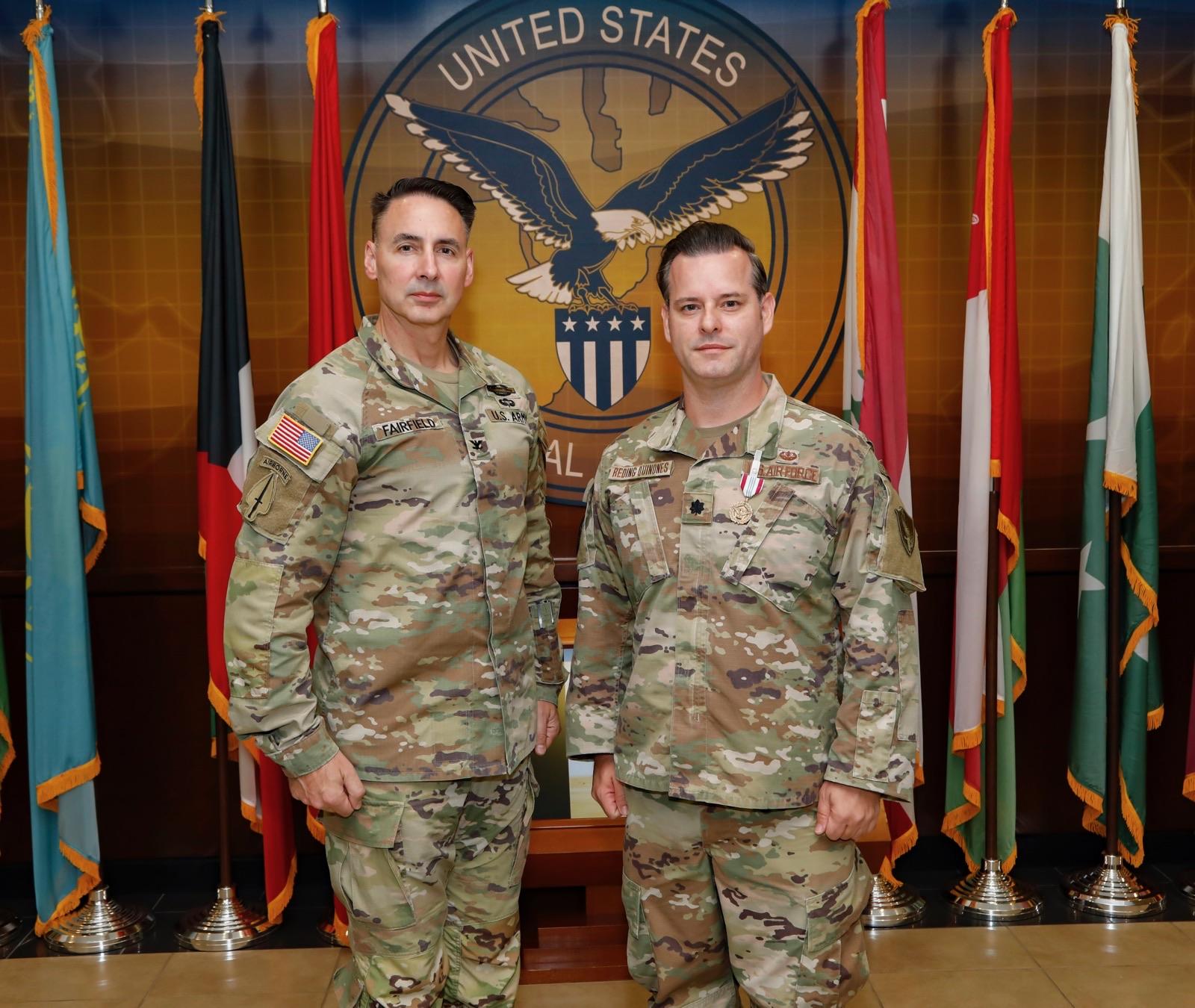
Reding Quiñones (right) receiving the Defense Meritorious Service Medal in 2025

== Legal career ==
In 2018 he joined the Justice Department in Washington, D.C., and was hired as a prosecutor in the major crimes section by the Attorney’s Office for the Eleventh Judicial Circuit Court of Florida in Miami later that year. Former colleagues have noted that his tenure as a line prosecutor was not particularly noteworthy. He received poor performance reviews from supervisors, who cited his incompetence and noted his low productivity. In response, Reding Quiñones filed a complaint against the office claiming he had been discriminated against because he is a white man and because of his duties as an Air Force reservist prevented him from performing at the same full-time level as other federal prosecutors.

From 2020–2021, he took an extended leave to serve in the Air Force Reserve. When he returned, he agreed to be reassigned to the civil division, and dropped his discrimination complaint.

== U.S. Attorney for the District of Southern Florida ==
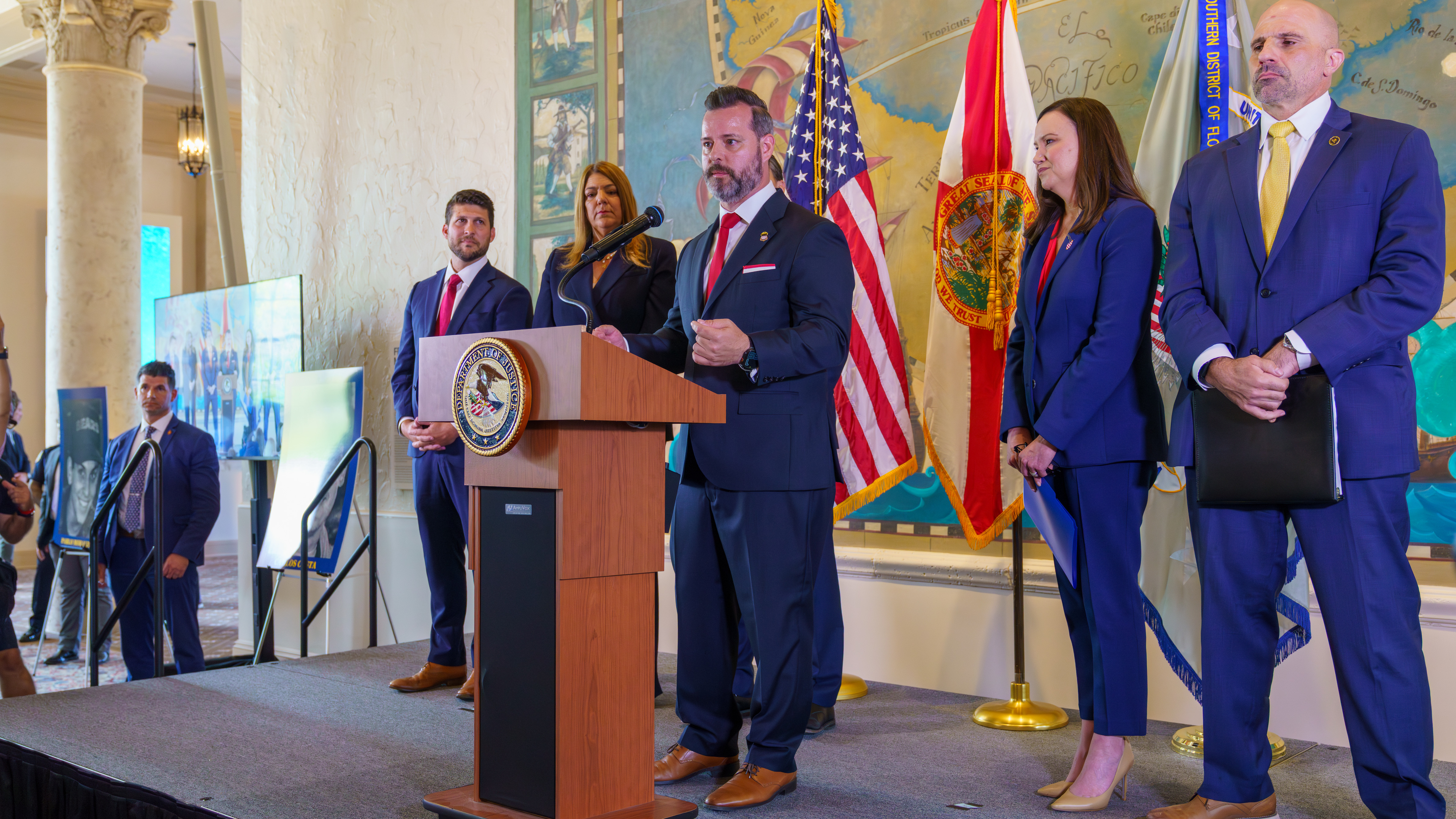
Reding Quiñones announcing the indictment against Raúl Castro, May 2026

On March 10, 2025, Reding Quiñones was nominated by President Donald Trump to be the United States Attorney for the Southern District of Florida.

That May, Senator Dick Durbin (D-IL), the ranking member of the Senate Judiciary Committee, put a hold on Reding Quiñones's nomination, "to ensure the appropriate Floor time is spent considering his nomination", citing the "new precedent" set by then-Senator J.D. Vance during the Biden administration for holding time-consuming roll call votes on the Senate floor for the confirmation of U.S. Attorney nominees, as opposed to a simple voice vote. In a statement, Durbin wrote "As I’ve said time and time again—there cannot be one set of rules for Republicans and another set for Democrats", and said he would leave open the possibility of doing the same "for other U.S. Attorney nominees who are reported to the Floor in the future."

Despite this, on August 2, 2025, Durbin was the only Democrat to vote with the Republicans in favor of Reding Quiñones's confirmation, which passed the Senate by a vote of 52-44.

Reding was sworn into office on August 13, 2025 by then Attorney General Pam Bondi, in contravention of a long standing tradition in which the chief judges for the Southern District of Florida swear in US attorneys. After his appointment, the Southern District saw an exodus of prosecutors and staff, which outsiders said could lead to the office being less able to prosecute white collar-crime and narcotics cases.

Reding Quiñones was the first U.S. Attorney confirmed during President Trump's second term. His appointment was noted by many former ex-Department of Justice officials as part of President's Trump's attempts to have the Department of Justice go after ideological opponents. Shortly after his appointment by Trump, Quiñones began overseeing an investigation into "whether a cabal of 'deep state' actors, including the former CIA director John Brennan, conspired to violate Trump's rights."

In November 2025, two newly hired U.S. attorneys resigned after Reding Quiñones ordered them to sign sworn statements, described by The Washington Post as "unusual penalty of perjury document[s], which would have put them in legal jeopardy if officials in the office ever believed they had lied". Legal observers called this an "unprecedented breach of internal protocols".

On May 20, 2026, Reding Quiñones unsealed an indictment charging Raúl Castro along with other co-defendants for their alleged roles in the February 24, 1996 shoot‑down of two unarmed U.S. civilian aircraft operated by Brothers to the Rescue (BTTR), also known as Hermanos al Rescate, over international waters.

In October, the Justice Department filed new charges in Washington — without a grand jury indictment or a judge’s signature — against James Comey, alleging he directed a leak of classified information to reporter at The New York Times reporter in 2016. Comey denied the accusation and is seeking to have the case dismissed.

On November 6, 2026, following the 2026 Congressional elections, Reding Quiñones resigned from the Justice Department, finishing his tenure that oversaw Trump's controversial "grand conspiracy" probe of political opponents, though no indictments were produced.

Legal offices
Preceded by Hayden O'Byrne	United States Attorney for the District of Southern Florida; 2025-2026	Succeeded by Yara Klukas (Acting)
