= Runa LLC =

Beverage company

Runa LLC is a privately held organic Amazonian beverage company that processes and sells guayusa. The company is based in Brooklyn, New York, with offices in Quito and Archidona, Ecuador. It was founded in 2008 by two Brown University graduates, Daniel MacCombie and Tyler Gage. The company operates the world's only guayusa processing facility, which is located in Archidona.

Runa began selling bagged guayusa on the East Coast in October 2010 in natural food stores and supermarkets. In September 2010, the company received its USDA organic certification. A certified Benefit corporation, Runa purchases guayusa directly from indigenous farmers who own their own land in a model following Fair Trade principles. Runa received its fair trade certification in 2011.

In 2018, Runa was acquired by All Market Inc., maker of Vita Coco Coconut Water.

== Products ==
Runa offers a variety of blends of guayusa for retail sale in the form of energy drinks, bottled iced teas, tea boxes, and loose leaf teas, all of which are USDA certified organic, Kosher certified, plantation farming, and non-GMO certified.

== Guayusa ==
=== Health benefits ===
Guayusa claims to contain "the same amount of caffeine as one cup of coffee". Guayusa also contains theobromine.

== Social mission ==
Runa purchases its guayusa from 600 indigenous Kichwa farmers in the Napo and Pastaza provinces of the Ecuadorian Amazon and pays a guaranteed minimum price to farmers. Runa also provides technical assistance and training programs to smallholder farmers through its team of eight indigenous field technicians. Farmers receive direct market access and training in sustainable agriculture and reforestation.

Runa's non-profit arm, Runa Foundation, provides tools and resources to indigenous communities and farmers' associations to increase access to markets and encourage sustainable agricultural practices. It focuses on social empowerment, community development, and environmental management.

== Awards ==
Runa won Brown University's Business Plan Competition and the Rhode Island Business Plan Competition and received second place in the William James Foundation's Socially Responsible Business Plan Competition.
