= Charles Littlejohn (disambiguation) =

Charles Littlejohn (born 1985) is a former American Internal Revenue Service (IRS) contractor known for leaking the tax returns of President Donald Trump and other rich people.

Charles Littlejohn may also refer to:

- Charles Littlejohn (rower) (1889–1960), New Zealand-born rower
- Charles Philip Littlejohn (1923–2014), the eleventh Clerk of the New Zealand House of Representatives
