= Tax returns of Donald Trump =

Donald Trump, President of the United States, controversially refused to release his tax returns after being elected president the first time in 2016, although he promised to do so during his campaign. (Note: According to multiple sources) (Note: There is no law requiring public disclosure of tax information for presidents or presidential candidates, but all major-party candidates and all presidents have done so since Richard Nixon's underpayment of taxes was revealed in a leak.) In 2021, the Manhattan district attorney (DA) obtained several years of Trump's tax information, and in late 2022, the U.S. House Ways and Means Committee obtained and released six years of his returns. (Note: Under the Revenue Act of 1924 (a response to the Teapot Dome scandal), the chair of the Ways and Means Committee has the right to obtain the tax records of any taxpayer.)

Trump repeatedly and falsely claimed that he could not release the returns while they were under audit by the Internal Revenue Service (IRS). (Note: Trump said he had been audited for a consecutive "twelve years or something like that"; it is rare for a taxpayer to be audited for several consecutive years. In 2016, Trump's tax attorneys stated that Trump has been under audit since 2002. However, in 2011, 2014, and 2015, Trump made offers to release his tax returns, presumably while he was still under audit.) After Democrats won a majority in the House of Representatives in 2018, Trump sued to prevent his returns from being released by the IRS or his accountants, which were being sought by certain state officials and congressional committees. The Manhattan DA's request for records as part of its criminal probe of the Trump Organization (regarding a hush-money payment made during the 2016 presidential campaign and alleged tax fraud) was appealed to the U.S. Supreme Court, resulting in a 2020 decision rejecting Trump's claims that the president holds absolute immunity from criminal process. In February 2021, Trump's accounting firm Mazars provided the DA eight years of Trump's tax returns.

In May 2019, Ways and Means Committee chair Richard Neal requested six years of Trump's tax records; after appeals were exhausted, he received the documents on November 30, 2022. Four weeks later, the committee voted 24–16 along party lines to release the returns to the public, which was done on December 30. The committee found that the IRS failed to audit Trump's taxes during the first two years of his presidency, and that the only audit conducted during his tenure was never completed. (Note: It is IRS policy, but not law, to annually audit tax returns of presidents and vice presidents.)

In 2019, the U.S. House Oversight Committee subpoenaed Mazars for tax and other records related to an investigation into Trump's conduct; an appeal to the Supreme Court resulted in a decision outlining circumstances Congress can request presidential records without violating separation of powers. (Note: Multiple sources) Also in 2019, California temporarily enacted legislation to require presidential candidates to release tax returns to be allowed on the primary election ballot, (Note: The California Supreme Court ruled that this law violated the state's constitution.) and New York State passed a law allowing the release of state tax returns to congressional committees for valid purposes.

In 2026, as part of an attempted settlement of Trump v. Internal Revenue Service, the Justice Department under the second Trump administration entered into a dubious and disputed legal agreement with the Trump family prohibiting the IRS from auditing their tax returns filed prior to May 2026.

== History of controversy ==
In 1999, while Donald Trump was considering whether to run for president under the Reform Party, he said he "probably wouldn't have a problem with" releasing his tax returns if he ran.

In April 2011, Trump said that when President Barack Obama produced "his birth certificate ... I'd love to give my tax returns." Obama's birth certificate was released a week later, resulting in Trump's saying his tax returns would be released "at the appropriate time".

An undocumented immigrant housekeeper from Costa Rica working at Trump National Golf Club in Bedminster, New Jersey, earned $26,792.90 and paid more in federal income taxes than Trump did ($0) in 2011.

In 2012, Trump sought to have Republican presidential candidate Mitt Romney's tax returns released on April 1, which "historically is the time that everybody gives them". That year, Trump also said that not seeing a presidential candidate's tax returns would lead people to think there was "almost, like, something wrong. What's wrong?"

Trump's former political adviser Sam Nunberg said in 2013 and 2014 that Trump had considered the possibility of releasing his tax returns as part of a presidential campaign, believing that showing how little he paid in taxes would make him appear to be a savvy businessman. Nunberg said by November 2014, he had persuaded Trump to reverse course and withhold his tax returns, as Trump decided he "wanted to look rich rather than smart". In May 2014, Trump said in an interview: "If I decide to run for office, I'll produce my tax returns, absolutely and I would love to do that."

=== 2016 campaign ===
In February 2015, Trump said he would release tax returns if he ran for president. On another occasion that month, he declared: "I have no objection to certainly showing tax returns." Later in February 2015, Trump warned: "I will tell you upfront ... I want to pay as little taxes as I can as a private person". In May 2016, Trump voiced similar sentiments, stating that he tries "very hard to pay as little tax as possible". In 2015, Trump criticized corporate executives and "hedge fund guys" for paying zero or negligible taxes. He also alleged in 2011 and 2012 that half of all Americans do not pay income taxes, stating, "it's a problem," while alluding to "crippling" government debt. In 2012, Trump had criticized President Obama for "only" paying a tax rate of around 20%. Trump announced his candidacy for president in June 2015.

In January 2016, Trump was asked by Chuck Todd if he would release his tax returns, to which Trump answered: "we'll be working that over in the next period of time, Chuck. Absolutely. ... at the appropriate time, you'll be very satisfied." In February 2016, Trump said he would release his tax returns "[p]robably over the next few months. They're being worked on now." Later that month, Trump falsely claimed that he could not release his tax returns while under audit. Nothing prevents a taxpayer from releasing his own tax returns; the IRS has confirmed that individuals are free to share their own tax information. (Note: Some tax lawyers advise clients under IRS audit not to release tax returns for tactical reasons, to avoid "crowdsourcing the audit." In contrast, economist Paul Krugman argued that Trump should be more willing to reveal his tax information if he were already under audit, as the reveal might have triggered an audit if there was not one.) Every president from Richard Nixon onward has voluntarily released his tax returns annually, and the IRS automatically (since the 1970s) audits the tax returns of presidents and vice presidents.

In May 2016, Trump said he would not release his tax returns before the November 2016 election. Trump also said in May 2016 that "there's nothing to learn from" his tax returns, and said on ABC News that his tax rate is "none of your business". Trump's refusal broke with tradition, as all major presidential nominees from 1976 onward have released their tax returns.

Trump was criticized for his refusal to release tax information. Mitt Romney called Trump's refusal "disqualifying" and said the only logical reason for Trump was that "there is a bombshell in them." John Fund of National Review feared that the returns contained an electoral "time bomb" and called upon Republican convention delegates to abstain from voting for Trump if he did not release the information.

During the presidential debates, Trump's opponent Hillary Clinton criticized Trump for not disclosing his tax returns, saying that only "a couple of years" of Trump's tax returns were publicly available, "and they showed he didn't pay any federal income tax." Trump responded: "That makes me smart." Clinton went on to suggest that Trump might not have "paid any federal income tax for a lot of years"; Trump responding by saying that the taxes he paid "would be squandered" by the government.

=== 2016 election and later ===
Fragments of information about Trump's taxes leaked at multiple times around the time of his election as president. In 2016, The Washington Post reported a prior audit of Trump's tax returns for 2002 through 2008 by the Internal Revenue Service (IRS) which was "closed administratively by agreement with the I.R.S. without assessment or payment, on a net basis, of any deficiency." The audit centered on a potential failure to report cancelled debts as income by Trump, and whether he performed a stock-for-debt swap. Some tax attorneys speculate that the government may ultimately have reduced what Trump was able to claim as a loss without requiring him to pay any additional taxes. It is unknown whether the IRS challenged Trump's use of the stock-for-debt swap, which is a maneuver with questionable legality. Congress had previously banned equity-for-debt swaps by corporations in 1993, and by partnerships such as Trump's in 2004.

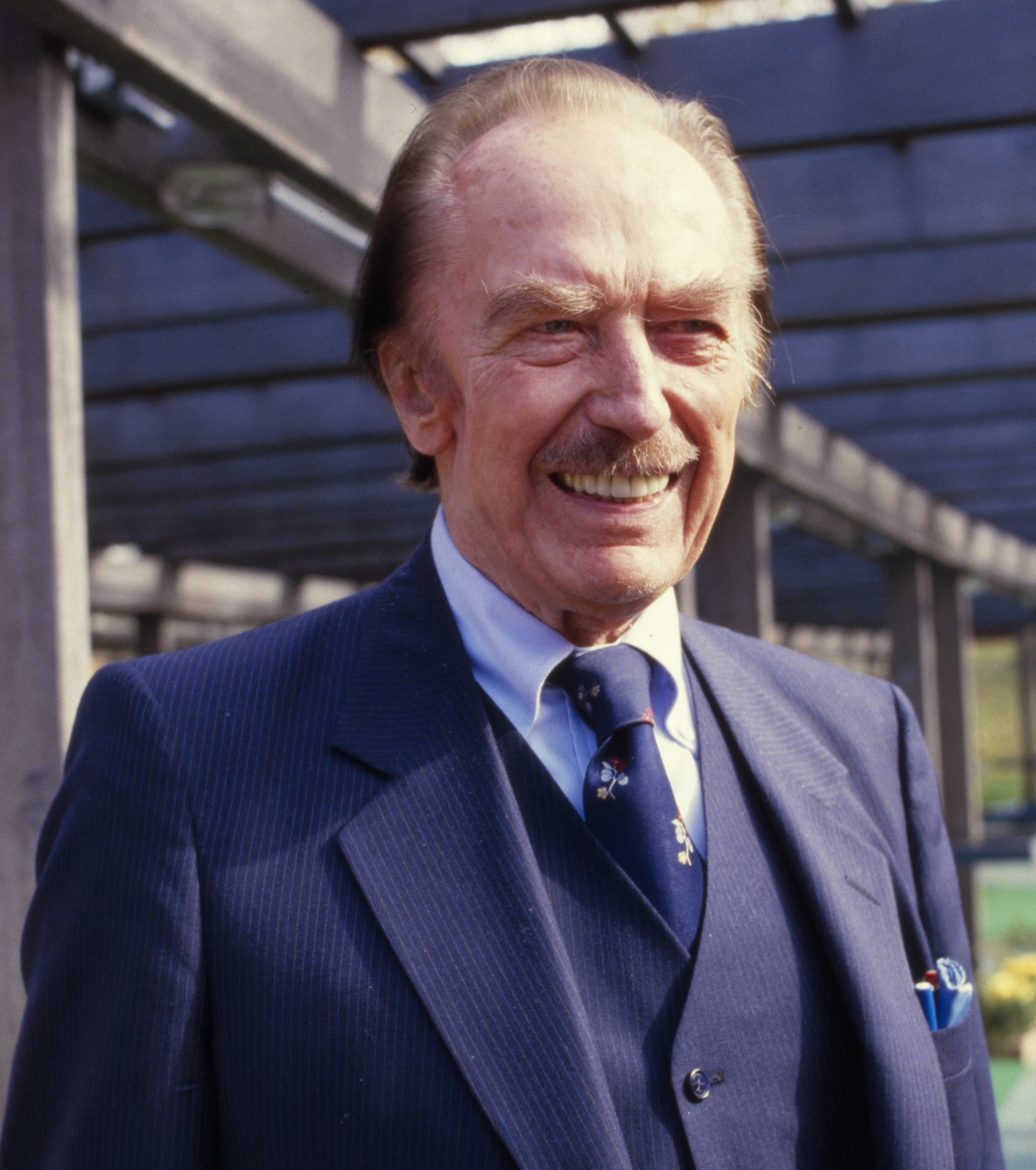
Trump's father, Fred

In separate leaks, parts of Trump's 1995 and 2005 returns were examined by multiple news organizations. In 2016, The New York Times examined three pages of his 1995 return and found that in that year, he declared a net operating loss of more than $500 million. Under section 172 of the Internal Revenue Code, this gave Trump a $915.7 million net loss. This loss was carried over to offset income for up to 18 years after it was originally claimed, and could have allowed him to pay no taxes at all for those years. In March 2017, journalist David Cay Johnston obtained the first two pages of Trump's 2005 federal income tax returns, which were given to Rachel Maddow and shown on MSNBC. These pages showed Trump's gross adjusted income to be $153 million, with $103 million in losses; he paid $38 million in federal taxes, including $31 million for the alternative minimum tax, which he was seeking to abolish. The White House described the losses as being from "large-scale depreciation for construction" and said the return had been "illegally published". Johnston said publishing the forms was legal because he had not been looking for them and "they might even have been sent by Mr. Trump himself". A team of New York Times journalists including Susanne Craig and David Barstow thought the income seemed inconsistent with any of Trump's known ventures from the time and suspected that it could be related to the 2004 sale of assets inherited from his father, Fred Trump. This sparked a larger investigation into the finances of Fred and Donald Trump.

As president, Trump continued to withhold his tax returns. In May 2017, Trump said he "might" release his tax returns only after he had stepped down as president. This was in spite of his previous commitment made during his campaign to release his tax returns once they were not under audit.

In 2018, the New York Times investigation into the finances of Fred and Donald Trump revealed that despite the claims of the latter to be a self-made billionaire, he had actually received more than $400 million (in 2018 dollars) from his father, most of it in ways that avoided paying gift or inheritance tax. The 13,000-word report was one of the longest investigative articles ever published by the Times.

On September 29, 2023, federal prosecutors announced they were charging someone with leaking the data from Trump's tax returns while he was a contractor for the IRS from 2018 to 2020. In October Charles E. Littlejohn pleaded guilty to unauthorized disclosure of tax returns and return information. On January 29, 2024, he received the maximum possible sentence of five years in federal prison and was fined $5,000.

As of October 13, 2024, Donald Trump and his running mate JD Vance had not released their tax returns, while Kamala Harris released two decades of returns, including her most recent returns in April. The lack of visibility into the returns of Trump and Vance raised conflict of interest concerns among some Americans.

== Subpoenas and investigations ==
=== House Ways and Means Committee ===
The December 15, 2022, report issued by the Joint Committee on Taxation to the House Ways and Means Committee (PDF file)

After winning control of the House in the 2018 elections, House Democrats signaled their intent to use their new power to demand Trump's tax returns in the new Congress, which convened in January 2019. On April 3, 2019, the chairman of the U.S. House Committee on Ways and Means, Congressman Richard Neal, formally requested IRS commissioner Charles P. Rettig to provide six years (2013 through 2018) of Trump's returns. The request, made in a letter, set a deadline of seven days. Neal again wrote to Rettig on April 13, setting a second deadline of April 23 and writing that a failure to meet the deadline would be "interpreted as a denial".

Under a 1924 federal tax law, § 6103 of title 26 of the United States Code, Congress may request copies of anyone's tax returns. The treasury secretary is legally obliged to provide the tax returns, and there is no apparent legal mechanism to deny Congress's request. On April 5, 2019, Trump's personal lawyer William Consovoy wrote a letter to the U.S. Department of the Treasury (the parent agency of the IRS), claiming that the request for Trump's tax information is "not consistent with governing law" and Congress is trying to violate Trump's First Amendment rights. A 2018 draft IRS legal memo, the contents of which became public in 2019, concluded that the IRS must provide the requested tax returns to Congress unless Trump invokes executive privilege, contradicting the administration's justification for defying the earlier subpoena.

On May 10, 2019, Neal issued a separate subpoena to the Treasury Department and the IRS for six years of Trump's personal and business tax returns. Neal said the committee wanted the tax records to evaluate "the extent to which the I.R.S. audits and enforces the federal tax laws against a president". On July 30, 2021, the Justice Department's Office of Legal Counsel wrote an opinion concluding that the committee's request was legitimate and the IRS must provide the information sought, but on August 4, Trump's legal team opined that the committee should stop investigating Trump's affairs, arguing that Neal's "requests have always been a transparent effort by one political party to harass an official from the other party because they dislike his politics and speech."

On August 9, 2022, a three-judge panel of the DC Circuit Court of Appeals said Neal's request was valid. Trump appealed to the full court, but on October 27, it denied his request for a rehearing. On October 31, Trump appealed to the Supreme Court. On November 1, Chief Justice John Roberts granted a temporary hold, giving the Supreme Court until November 10 to consider the matter. On November 22, the Supreme Court ruled that the IRS could release the tax returns to the House Ways and Means committee. On November 30, the Treasury Department sent six years of tax returns to the committee.

On December 20, 2022, the House Ways and Means committee voted to release Trump's tax returns publicly. The same day, the committee published a report which found that the IRS did not start audits on Trump's 2017 tax filing until 2019, and that only one mandatory audit was started and none completed during Trump's four years in office. The committee released the returns on December 30, following their redaction to protect sensitive personal information.

=== House Oversight and Reform Committee ===
On April 15, 2019, the chairman of the House Committee on Oversight and Reform, Representative Elijah Cummings, issued a subpoena to the accounting firm Mazars USA, LLP, requesting tax records and other "financial documents concerning the President and his companies covering years both before and during his presidency." Cummings identified four areas that the committee aimed to investigate through the subpoena: (1) whether Trump "may have engaged in illegal conduct before and during his tenure in office"; (2) whether Trump "has undisclosed conflicts of interest that may impair his ability to make impartial policy decisions"; (3) whether Trump was complying with the Constitution's Foreign Emoluments Clause and Domestic Emoluments Clause; and (4) whether Trump "has accurately reported his finances to the Office of Government Ethics and other federal entities."

On March 3, 2021, the new chairwoman of the committee, Representative Carolyn Maloney, reissued the subpoena against Mazars USA after the initial subpoena for financial records, related to an investigation into Trump, expired at the end of 166th Congress.

On September 12, 2022, Trump and the committee settled a civil suit about information from 2014 to 2018. Within several days, Mazars began providing Trump's financial records to the committee.

=== Failure to comply ===
The Trump administration refused to comply with the subpoenas. On May 6, 2019, after weeks of delay, Treasury Secretary Steven Mnuchin sent a letter to House Ways and Means Committee Chair Neal, asserting that the subpoena lacked "a legitimate legislative purpose" and that "the department may not lawfully fulfill the committee's request," although the IRS had released Richard Nixon's tax returns the same day Congress requested them in 1973. The Trump's administration's Justice Department, through a memo written by Office of Legal Counsel head Steven Engel, issued an opinion supporting Mnuchin's refusal to release Trump's tax returns. This triggered a legal battle between the administration and Congress. Neal criticized the administration's position, saying that its objections "lack merit" and "judicial precedent commands that none of the concerns raised can legitimately be used to deny the committee's request."

On April 7, 2019, Mick Mulvaney, Trump's acting White House chief of staff, said Trump's tax returns will "never" be released. Trump and Mulvaney have argued that voters have no interest in Trump's tax returns and that the issue had been "litigated" when Trump was elected.

In April 2019, a Trump adviser speaking on condition of anonymity told Fox News that Trump repeatedly questioned his aides about the status of the congressional request, and also asked about the "loyalty" of top IRS officials. Trump appointee Michael J. Desmond, who as Chief Counsel of the IRS and Assistant General Counsel in the Department of the Treasury is responsible for giving legal advice to the IRS commissioner, previously served as a tax advisor to the Trump Organization and also worked alongside two other longtime tax advisors to the Trump Organization. According to The New York Times, on February 5, 2019, Trump asked Senate Majority Leader Mitch McConnell to speed up Desmond's confirmation and indicated that confirming Desmond was a higher priority to him than confirming William Barr for Attorney General.

Also in April 2019, Trump and White House Press Secretary Sarah Sanders said he would not release his tax returns while they are under audit, although nothing precludes a person from releasing tax returns that are under audit, a fact reaffirmed by IRS commissioner Rettig. Sanders also opined that Congress is not "smart enough" to examine Trump's tax returns, although ten members of Congress are accountants, including three certified public accountants.

On April 10, 2019, Trump incorrectly stated that "there's no law whatsoever" requiring him to provide Congress his tax returns. While there is no law requiring presidents to publish their tax returns, federal law of IRS Code section 6103(f) authorizes Congress to look at anyone's tax returns "when sitting in closed executive session" (though the taxpayer could refuse for their identifying information to be shared outside of that session).

On May 7, 2019, The New York Times revealed that it had acquired information about Trump's tax returns showing more than a billion dollars in business losses with a decade in the red.

=== Interference with IRS audit ===
On July 29, 2019, a career IRS official filed a whistleblower complaint with the House Ways and Means Committee, Senate Finance Committee, and Treasury inspector general for tax administration, stating that at least one Treasury Department official had inappropriately interfered in the audit process for the tax returns of the president and vice president, which takes place annually in accordance with IRS policy. The possibility that political appointees interfered with audits conducted by career civil servants alarmed former IRS officials and legal experts. Due to stringent laws regarding disclosure of tax information, the details of the complaint have not been made public. However, Representative Richard Neal, the Democratic chair of the House Ways and Means Committee, said in September 2019 that he was consulting legal counsel on whether the whistleblower's complaint could be publicly released.

The whistleblower's report was referred to by Neal and other House Democrats in the federal lawsuit regarding Trump's refusal to comply with a House Ways and Means Committee subpoena for the returns; in a filing, Neal wrote that the whistleblower's complaint presents credible evidence of potential inappropriate efforts to influence "the mandatory audit program" and raises "serious and urgent concerns", thereby bolstering the committee's case for obtaining the tax returns.

== Lawsuits ==
=== Committee on Ways & Means v. U.S. Department of the Treasury and Trump ===
On May 17, 2019, Treasury Secretary Steven Mnuchin again refused to hand over the records subpoenaed by the House Committee on Ways and Means. The IRS refusal to provide the records sought was based on an opinion of Office of Legal Counsel Steven Engel dated June 2019 which argued that the House lacked a "legitimate legislative purpose" to warrant receiving the information.

On July 2, 2019, the committee sued Mnuchin and IRS commissioner Charles Rettig to enforce the subpoena and obtain six years of Trump's tax returns. The action, in the U.S. District Court for the District of Columbia before Judge Trevor McFadden, was taken pursuant to Internal Revenue Code Section 6103(f) which states that the Treasury Department "shall furnish" any tax return requested in writing by the Ways & Means Committee. Trump was added to the case as an intervenor. In September 2019, a bipartisan group of six former general counsels to the House of Representatives filed an amicus brief in the case, urging the court to reject Trump's claims that the House lacks standing to bring the case. In January 2020, the judge stayed proceedings in the case, pending the resolution of the In re McGahn case by the U.S. Court of Appeals for the D.C. Circuit.

On March 4, 2021, the Department of Justice (DOJ), representing the Treasury Department, requested an additional month to determine its response to the committee's request for Trump's tax returns. Judge McFadden granted the government more time and ordered the parties to submit a status report on March 31. On July 30, Acting assistant attorney general for the Office of Legal Counsel Dawn Johnsen wrote an opinion stating that the Treasury Department must turn over Trump's tax returns to the committee, stating that the committee had "invoked sufficient reasons" to request the tax information, reversing Engel's June 2019 opinion. Johnsen wrote that Engel's opinion "failed to afford the Committee the respect due to a coordinate branch of government." On August 4, Trump's legal team intervened in the case in an attempt to end the committee's investigations into Trump's affairs, arguing that his tax returns are still "the subject of ongoing examinations by the IRS", that they should be permanently blocked from being released, and that Trump's legal expenses in the matter should be reimbursed.

Judge McFadden dismissed the counter- and cross-claims in December 2021, allowing the returns to be released to the committee, stating Trump was "wrong on the law" and that Congress is due "great deference" in its inquiries. McFadden granted a 14-day delay in the release of the returns to allow the parties to negotiate terms of the release, or for Trump to appeal to the D.C. Circuit Court of Appeals. The decision was eventually appealed to the Supreme Court; its November 2022 ruling resulted in the release of the records to the committee, which then publicly released the returns on December 30. In January 2023, Trump dropped his dispute with Congress in a joint filing with a House committee, saying the new Republican leadership "has no interest" in the returns.

=== Trump v. Mazars USA, LLP ===
On May 20, 2019, U.S. district judge Amit Mehta of the U.S. District Court for the District of Columbia, refused a request by Trump's attorneys to quash the subpoena from the House Oversight Committee directed to Trump's accounting firm, Mazars USA LLP, ruling that the subpoena must be complied with. The district court held that the subpoena was well within Congress's broad investigative powers and rejected Trump's claim that the subpoena to Mazars was "a usurpation of an exclusively executive or judicial function."

Trump then appealed to the U.S. Court of Appeals for the District of Columbia, which heard oral argument on July 12, 2019, and then issued a ruling against Trump on October 11, 2019. In its 2–1 ruling, the court of appeals upheld the lower court's ruling, holding that "contrary to the President's arguments, the Committee possesses authority under both the House Rules and the Constitution to issue the subpoena" for eight years of tax returns to Mazars, and that Mazars therefore "must comply" with the subpoena. The 66-page majority opinion was written by Judge David S. Tatel, joined by Patricia A. Millett; Judge Neomi Rao, a Trump appointee, dissented. Trump's motion for rehearing en banc (i.e., before the entire D.C. Circuit) was denied on November 13, 2019, on an 8–3 vote. The ruling was the second appeals court decision within ten days against Trump regarding release of his tax returns.

Trump subsequently filed a petition for a writ of certiorari to the Supreme Court of the United States, asking the Court to review the case. On December 13, 2019, the Supreme Court decided to review both the Trump v. Mazars US, LLP case (Supreme Court No. 19-715) and the Trump v. Deutsche Bank AG case (Supreme Court No. 19-760). The court consolidated them and indicated that they would be set for oral argument sometime in March 2020. The Second Circuit's mandate was stayed pending the Supreme Court's decision in the case. The Court's decision in the case is believed to be a likely landmark ruling on how far presidents may resist subpoenas or other demands for information from the Congress and from prosecutors.

On July 9, 2020, the Supreme Court issued its 7–2 ruling, vacating the D.C. Circuit's decision and remanding the case for further review. This made it unlikely that the Trumps' taxes would be released before the election and the end of both his term and those of the 116th Congress. On July 20, 2020, the Supreme Court issued an unsigned order denying a motion by House Democrats to expedite the litigation in lower courts; the order reduced the likelihood that congressional investigators would obtain the tax records before the November election. Justice Sonia Sotomayor noted that she would have granted the motion.

=== Trump v. Vance ===
In September 2019, The New York Times reported that in late August 2019, soon after opening an investigation into hush-money payments to Stormy Daniels, the Manhattan district attorney's office, led by Cyrus R. Vance Jr., subpoenaed Trump's accounting firm, Mazars USA, for Trump's individual tax returns from January 2011 to August 2019 and corporate tax records for the Trump Organization. The Times reported in August 2020 that in 2019 the district attorney had also subpoenaed Trump's primary bank, Deutsche Bank, which complied with financial statements and other records Trump had provided when he sought loans from the bank. Citing grand jury secrecy rules, the district attorney did not reveal the scope of the investigation, but in court filings prosecutors stated that publicly available evidence regarding the conduct of Trump and his businesses would justify a grand jury investigation into tax fraud and financial crimes such as insurance fraud, falsification of business records, and other crimes.

Trump sought to quash the subpoena in federal court, contending that a sitting president enjoys, in the court's words, "absolute immunity from criminal process of any kind". In court filings in September 2019, New York prosecutors rejected Trump's claim of "sweeping immunity" from a criminal probe while he is in office, writing that Trump was "seeking to invent and enforce a new presidential 'tax return privilege', on the theory that disclosing information in a tax return will necessarily reveal information that will somehow impede the functioning of a President, sufficiently to meet the test of irreparable harm."

On October 7, 2019, Judge Victor Marrero of the U.S. District Court for the Southern District of New York rejected Trump's effort to prevent his tax returns from being turned over to the New York grand jury, and ordered Trump comply with the subpoena. In a 75-page opinion, the court called Trump's contention an overreach of executive power that is "repugnant to the nation's governmental structure and constitutional values". Enforcement of the subpoena was temporarily delayed pending consideration by the U.S. Court of Appeals for the Second Circuit. Later the same month, oral argument before the Second Circuit took place before a three-judge panel of Chief Judge Robert A. Katzmann, Judge Denny Chin, and Judge Christopher F. Droney. Trump's private lawyer, William S. Consovoy, argued that a president enjoyed absolute "presidential immunity" from all investigation and criminal process while in office; responding to a hypothetical from the court, Consovoy said the president should be shielded even if he hypothetically committed murder on Fifth Avenue in Manhattan. In response, counsel for the Manhattan district attorney's office told the court "there is no such thing as presidential immunity for tax returns" and noted that tax returns are frequently subpoenaed in financial investigations.

On November 4, 2019, a three-judge panel of the Second Circuit ruled unanimously that Mazars must comply with the subpoena and hand over Trump's tax returns, saying that the president is not immune from "the enforcement of a state grand jury subpoena directing a third party to produce non-privileged material, even when the subject matter under investigation pertains to the President" and that a state grand jury may permissibly issue subpoenas "in aid of its investigation of potential crimes committed by persons within its jurisdiction, even if that investigation may in some way implicate the President". Noting that "the President concedes that his immunity lasts only so long as he holds office and that he could therefore be prosecuted after leaving office," the Second Circuit ruled that there "is no obvious reason why a state could not begin to investigate a President during his term and, with the information secured during that search, ultimately determine to prosecute him after he leaves office."

Trump subsequently filed a petition for a writ of certiorari to the Supreme Court, asserting that the grand-jury subpoena directed to him violates Article II and the Supremacy Clause of the Constitution. In December 2019, the Court agreed to hear the appeal. After oral arguments were delayed due to the COVID-19 pandemic, the case was argued on May 12, 2020. On July 9, 2020, the Supreme Court issued its 7–2 ruling, holding (in an opinion written by Chief Justice John G. Roberts, Jr.) that "Article II and the supremacy clause of the Constitution do not categorically preclude, or require a heightened standard for, the issuance of a state criminal subpoena to a sitting president." Roberts wrote: "No citizen, not even the president, is categorically above the common duty to produce evidence when called upon in a criminal proceeding." The court thus rejected Trump's claim that he was absolutely immune from the New York grand jury criminal subpoenas, but allowed Trump to return to the lower court to make a different argument for withholding his returns, such as scope or relevance.

On remand to the District Court, Trump's attorneys argued that the subpoena was "wildly overbroad" and issued in bad faith. On August 20, 2020, Judge Marrero rejected this argument, again ordering that Trump's tax returns be turned over to prosecutors. Trump's attorneys immediately requested an emergency stay, which Marrero denied. The U.S. Court of Appeals for the Second Circuit granted a stay to Trump on September 1, 2020, and oral argument before that court was held on September 25, 2020. During the hearing, the three judges appeared skeptical of Trump's central argument that the subpoena constituted an overbroad "fishing expedition." On October 7, 2020, the Second Circuit Court ruled in favor of Vance, but stayed enforcement to allow time for Trump's lawyers to file an emergency application with the Supreme Court six days later. This requested a stay of the appeals court decision pending a hearing by the Supreme Court. On February 22, 2021, the Supreme Court denied the stay request, clearing the path for Trump's tax records as well as other records to be released to prosecutors for review by a grand jury.

Within hours of the Supreme Court's ruling, Mazars handed over to Vance millions of pages of documents containing Trump's tax returns from January 2011 to August 2019, as well as financial statements, engagement agreements, documents relating to the preparation and review of tax returns, and work papers and communications related to the tax returns. By March 19, 2021, Trump's former personal lawyer Michael Cohen had met eight times with investigators for the Manhattan district attorney to cooperate with their inquiry.

In a separate action, on February 19, 2021, the Manhattan district attorney's office subpoenaed the New York City Tax Commission, suggesting it sought to examine the real estate values Trump had claimed related to his property taxes.

=== Lawsuit against the Internal Revenue Service ===
Trump v. Internal Revenue Service
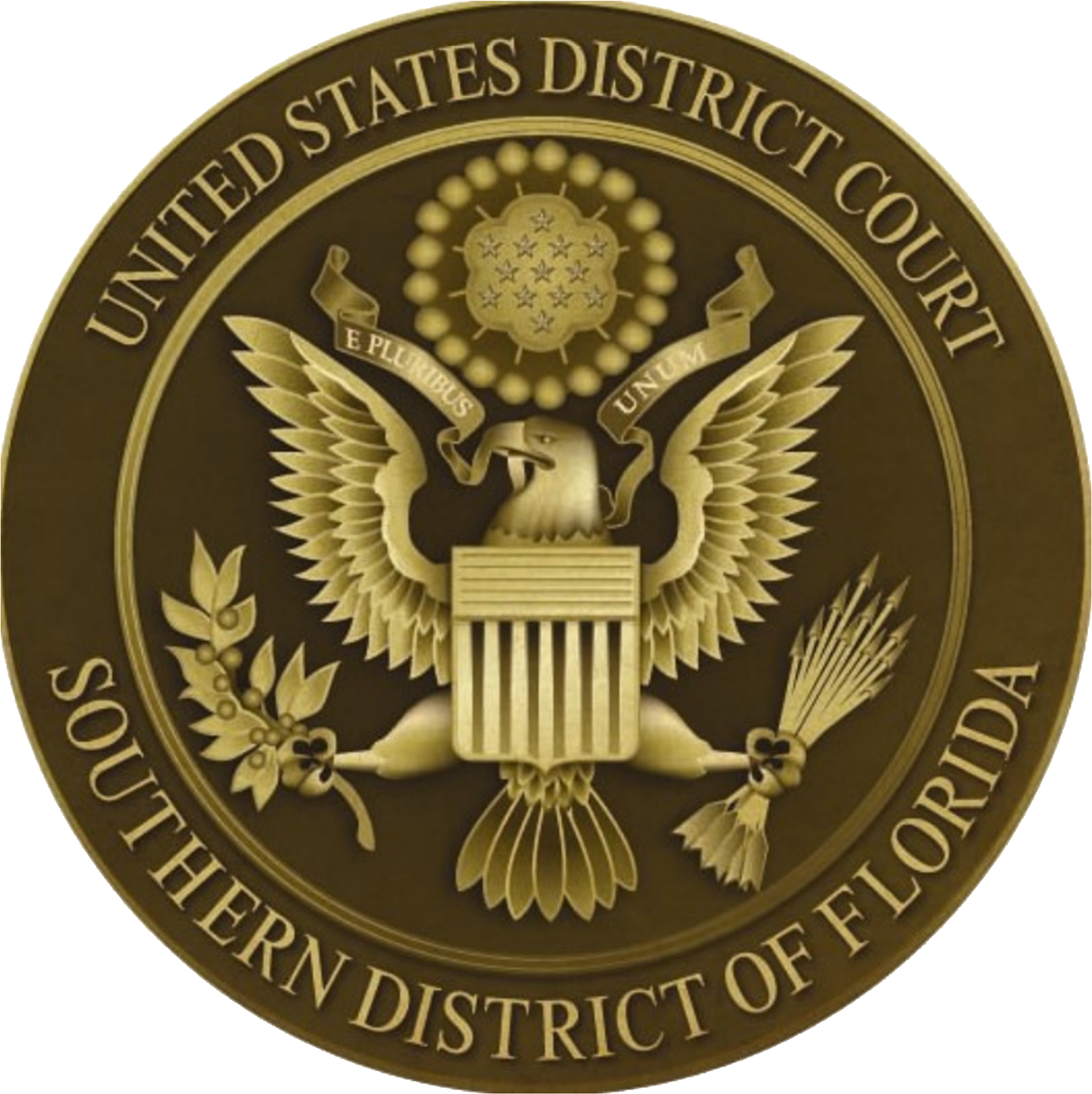
- Court: Southern District of Florida
- Full case name: President Donald Trump, Donald Trump Jr., Eric Trump, and The Trump Organization v. Internal Revenue Service and US Treasury
- Started: January 29, 2026; 9 months ago
- Docket nos.: 1:26-cv-20609

Court membership
- Judge sitting: Kathleen M. Williams

Keywords
- Second Trump presidency § Ethics

On January 29, 2026, Donald Trump, Eric Trump, Donald Trump Jr. and the Trump Organization sued the IRS for $10 billion. The plaintiffs said that Littlejohn's leaks in 2018 and 2020 had caused them "reputational and financial harm, public embarrassment, unfairly tarnished their business reputations, portrayed them in a false light, and negatively affected President Trump, and the other Plaintiffs' public standing." In May 2026, as a part of a settlement, a new "Anti-Weaponization Fund" was announced, setting aside $1.776 billion of public funds to distribute to allies of Donald Trump who claimed to be victims of federal "weaponization and lawfare”. Democrats, as well as outgoing GOP senator Bill Cassidy, called it a slush fund. Acting U.S. Attorney General Todd Blanche, former personal lawyer for Trump, provided a brief addendum to the settlement saying that the IRS could never again pursue unpaid taxes from Trump's family or perform audits on the Trump family.

== Contents of returns ==
In 2019, The New York Times obtained partial information from transcripts of Trump's IRS Form 1040s (the main personal federal tax form) from 1985 to 1994, revealing that during that time Trump lost $1.17 billion—the most of almost any individual U.S. taxpayer—evidently to avoid tax liability in eight of those years. Trump has acknowledged tax advantages inherent to the real-estate business, such as large write-offs from using depreciation of property to generate losses and reduce tax liabilities, which according to the Times "cannot account for the hundreds of millions of dollars in losses."

=== The New York Times investigation ===
On September 27, 2020, The New York Times published a report on more than two decades of Trump's tax-return data, including information from 2017 and 2018 (his first two years in office), having obtained the data earlier that month. The documents contradict many of Trump's public claims to have a flourishing and prosperous business empire, showing that as a result of reporting losses in many years and receiving a $72.9 million tax refund, Trump paid no net federal income taxes in 11 of 18 years of the past two decades. After the refund, Trump had an average tax bill of $1.4 million per year over the 18 years. In 2016, Trump paid only $750 in federal income tax, and in 2017, he paid another $750 in federal income tax. This was much less than other recent presidents paid while in office. His immediate two predecessors, Obama and George W. Bush, routinely paid $100,000 annually in federal income tax, and sometimes far more. In 2017, Trump's pre-credit tax liability was $7,435,857. All but $750 of this amount was negated by carried-over tax credits, of which he had $22.7 million at the time. It is unclear why Trump chose not to completely cancel out his federal income tax liability. The data does not reveal Trump's net worth. Tax-return data largely lack specifics allowing for financial connections to be identified, and the data does not reveal any previously unknown connections to Russia.

In the 18 years examined by the Times, Trump engaged in tax avoidance to a far greater extent than most affluent Americans (the top 0.001% of tax filers). Due to this avoidance, Trump paid "about $400 million less in combined federal income taxes than a very wealthy person who paid the average for that group each year." While in many years Trump ended with little or no tax liability, there is no evidence he ever failed to file a return or pay his expected tax burden by the annual filing deadline (including extensions), even if such payments were later refunded when the returns were completed. Over two decades, Trump's golf courses and other businesses regularly lost significant amounts of money, which is one way Trump was able to reduce his tax liability. For example, in 2018 Trump reported $47.4 million in losses, and since 2000, Trump reported total losses of $315.6 million from his golf courses alone. While Trump had significant income in many years, including from The Apprentice, he placed millions of dollars into his businesses which recorded losses for the year. Many of these businesses also claimed significant non-cash losses for depreciation of owned properties, but this cannot account for the entirety of the losses Trump claimed on his returns. Trump Tower in New York is one of the few businesses Trump owns that turns an annual profit, but as of 2020 he still appeared to owe the $100 million mortgage which was set to come due in 2022.

Beginning in 2011, the IRS was auditing Trump's $72.9 million tax refund covering multiple years of paid taxes; the audit was not resolved as of 2020. If the IRS determines that the refund was improper, Trump would be required to repay more than $100 million, which includes interest on the amount. Trump has also personally guaranteed $421 million in debt, most of which is due within four years. Trump previously expressed regret that he had personally guaranteed debt during the 1980s which brought him close to personal bankruptcy when his businesses faltered in the early 1990s. The bulk of the debt came from Trump's struggling Doral golf resort ($125 million) and the Washington, D.C., Trump International Hotel ($160 million). Trump also had failed to pay back $287 million in debt since 2010, according to the Times "far more money than previously known". Forgiven debt is supposed to be treated as income, but Trump used tax provisions to avoid or defer reporting it as such.

The Times notes that multiple potential violations of tax rules are present in the refunds examined. This includes the payment of "consulting fees" to Trump's daughter Ivanka Trump while she was a top executive at the Trump Organization, which was used to reduce Trump's tax liability. Overall, Trump's companies appeared to claim 20% of their income was used for "consulting fees" – which do not need to be explained further but can be written off as business expenses. Trump also appears to have aggressively classified personal-lifestyle related expenses as business expenses in order to write them off and reduce his liability. This includes at least $70,000 used for haircuts (some during the production of The Apprentice), as well as more than $100,000 to a makeup artist and hair stylist favored by Ivanka Trump. In many years Trump also classified payments for his aircraft and its support as business expenses. Trump also classified Seven Springs, his estate in Bedford, New York, as an "investment property" in order to write off $2.2 million in property taxes, even though the family uses it as a personal retreat.

Over the years examined, Trump reported receiving $73 million in revenue from outside the U.S., including some from licensing deals in countries with authoritarian rulers. He was also paid more than $8.7 million by the multilevel marketing company ACN Inc., which was accused of defrauding vulnerable consumers. Trump shot promotional videos for the company, which was accused of consumer fraud in a lawsuit filed in 2018. The Times reported that Trump's financial condition at the time he announced his presidential candidacy in 2015 "lends some credence to the notion that his long-shot campaign was at least in part a gambit to reanimate the marketability of his name".

==== Responses and analysis ====
Trump dismissed the Times report, responding with a blend of denials and justifications. He criticized what he called the "bad intent" of the report, but did not dispute the facts behind it. He also contended that the tax authorities had mistreated him.

House speaker Nancy Pelosi said Trump's indebtedness raises concerns about national security, since it represents "over $400 million in leverage that somebody has over the president" and it was not known to whom the debt is owed.

Writing for New York Daily News, investigative journalist David Cay Johnston opined that the returns could help convict Trump in the Manhattan district attorney's criminal probe, stating that they evidence "easy-to-prove state income tax fraud charges". According to Johnston, the returns are "rich with what the IRS calls 'badges of fraud,'" such as "hundreds of thousands of dollars in unexplained expenses" on numerous Schedule C forms showing zero income and "revenues and expenses that [suspiciously match] to the dollar". Johnston said these methods were used by Trump in 1984 and found by New York judges to constitute civil tax fraud.

The Daily News separately argued that the returns "show that Trump is a proven liar", specifically claiming that in both 2014 and 2015 he was erroneously awarded $300 for a New York school property tax exemption, which is only for people with a federal adjusted gross income (AGI) under $500,000. Trump refunded hundreds of dollars and did not claim the break again, but his returns from 2015 to 2017 and 2020 report negative AGI—making him eligible for the exemption in those years.

=== Trump International Hotel and Tower tax breaks ===
In May 2024, The New York Times and ProPublica revealed that Trump improperly used tax breaks relating to his skyscraper in Chicago, claiming in 2010 that the transfer of funds into a partnership constituted a $168 million loss.

== Reactions ==
=== Tax March protests ===
In January 2017, an online petition on the "We the People" portion of the White House's website calling for the release of Trump's tax returns was set up. The petition gained more than a million signatures, becoming the most signed petition on the White House's website. However, the White House gave no official response to the petition as of April 2017. Trump spokesperson Kellyanne Conway then said that "The White House response is that he's not going to release the tax returns" and that "people didn't care" about Trump's tax returns. In response, Jennifer Taub and others planned the Tax March on April 15, 2017 (Tax Day) to demand that Trump release his tax returns; tens of thousands of people marched in New York and dozens of cities across the country.

=== California primary election law ===
On July 30, 2019, California governor Gavin Newsom signed the Presidential Tax Transparency and Accountability Act (S.B. 27), a law requiring candidates for president and California governor, as a condition for gaining California ballot access, to release their most recent five years of federal tax returns at least 98 days ahead of the primary election (which would be November 26, 2019, for the 2020 primaries, since the California primary is on March 3, 2020).

Trump immediately sued the State of California, seeking to block implementation of the law, asserting that the law is unconstitutional. On September 19, 2019, U.S. district judge Morrison C. England issued a temporary injunction blocking the law from taking effect. California appealed; California secretary of state Alex Padilla said: "Our elected leaders have a legal and moral obligation to be transparent with voters about potential conflicts of interest. This law is fundamental to preserving and protecting American democracy." In December 2019, the U.S. Court of Appeals for the Ninth Circuit dismissed California's appeal of the federal district court decision as moot, in light of the California Supreme Court's decision (see below).

The law was separately challenged in state court, and in November 2019, the California Supreme Court unanimously invalidated the law, meaning that Trump did not have to release his tax returns to get on the primary ballot in California in 2020. Chief Justice Tani Gorre Cantil-Sakauye wrote that "The Legislature may well be correct that a presidential candidate's income tax returns could provide California voters with important information" but that the requirement to release the returns conflicted with the California Constitution's "specification of an inclusive open presidential primary ballot".

=== New York State TRUST Act ===
In May 2019, the New York State Senate passed the TRUST Act, which would amend state law to permit the commissioner of the state Department of Taxation and Finance to release any state tax return requested by the leaders of the House Ways and Means Committee, the Senate Finance Committee or the Joint Committee on Taxation for any "specific and legitimate legislative purpose." The New York State Assembly approved the bill on May 22, sending it to the governor. On July 8, Governor Andrew M. Cuomo signed the bill.

Trump sued the state and the House Ways and Means Committee fifteen days later to block release of the tax returns. In November 2019, Trump's suit was dismissed on personal jurisdiction grounds.

== See also ==
- Annual financial disclosures of Donald Trump
