= Anna DePalma =

American social media personality and professional golfer (born 1991)

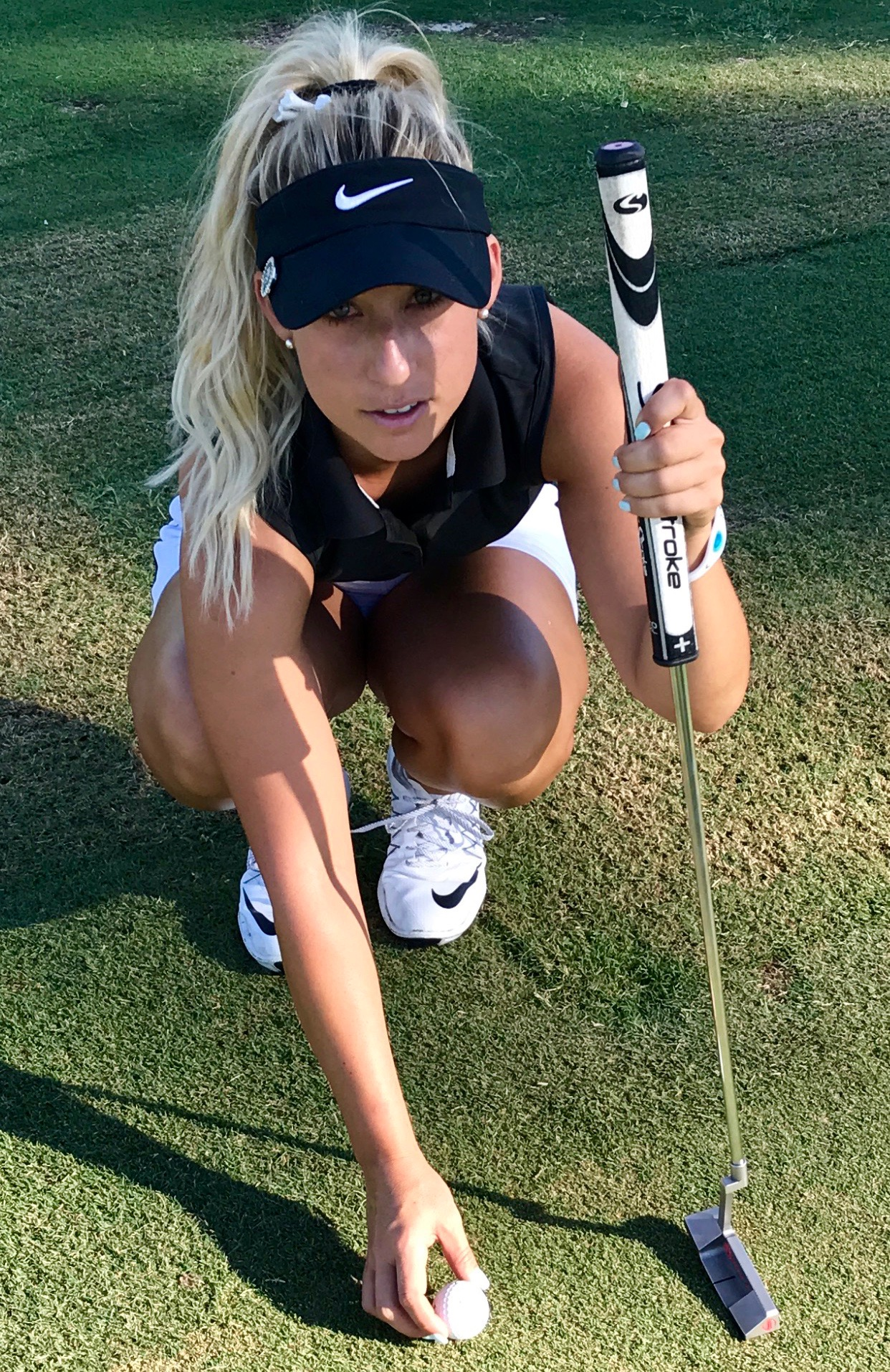
- DePalma in 2019

Personal information
- Full name: Anna Marie DePalma-Skogen
- Nationality: United States
- Born: October 7, 1991 (age 35) San Clemente, California, U.S.
- Height: 5 ft 3 in (160 cm)
- Spouse: Mark Skogen

Career
- Sport: Golf
- College: University of Hawaii at Manoa; University of Iowa
- Turned professional: 2015
- Former tours: Cactus Tour; Sun Coast Tour

Anna DePalma (born October 7, 1991) is an American social media personality and professional golfer. She started playing golf at the age of 12 in Rancho Mirage, California at Mission Hills Country Club. She became competitive with the game her freshman year of high school. She attended the University of Hawaii at Manoa on a golf scholarship and transferred to the University of Iowa on a golf scholarship in 2012. DePalma graduated from the University of Iowa in May 2014 with a Mass Communication degree. DePalma turned professional in 2015. She has competed on the Cactus Tour.

DePalma is the co-owner, with Armana Christianson, of the blog Graceful Golfer.

== High school golf career ==
DePalma graduated from San Clemente High School in California in 2010. She lettered four years in golf at San Clemente High and was named all-league four consecutive years. She was also team captain for three years. DePalma is a four-time scholar-athlete award winner. She earned first place at the 2010 CIF Southern Section Individual Championship, placing 10th at the CIF regional competition. She was named Most Valuable Player of the South Coast League and second team all-county. In 2009 she was invited to participate in the "Shot from the Top" taking 3rd place winner of the Toshiba Classic. She was runner-up at the Palm Desert Tournament, 3rd place winner at the Cypress Ridge of the Toyota Tour Cup Series and has 2 wins and 6 top-10 finishes in her career. DePalma also participated in the 2009 Joanne Winter Arizona Silverbelle and the 2010 Kathy Whitworth Invitational. She was on the USA team VS China in 2009.

== Professional golf career ==
DePalma turned professional in 2015. She played on the Cactus Tour, which is based out of Phoenix, Arizona. She won the Planet Hope Celebrity Golf Event in Cancun, Mexico. She has been invited to play the Shop Rite LPGA Pro-am since 2015 to present. She was one of three female professional golfers invited to the Coco Cola Invitational in Las Vegas at Shadow Creek. She has appeared in Driver vs Driver 2, a television shop Wilson Staff produces to find their next NEW Driver, this show appears on the Golf Channel. DePalma has 2 top-10s. She has volunteered with First Tee of San Diego: Pro Kids in San Diego, a non profit organization to help kids be Pro Kids within golf, as well as raised thousands of dollars for non-profit and charities on the golf course.

== In business ==
DePalma currently plays New Level and Wilson Staff clubs. She currently is an ambassador for Nike, Electric sunglass, Body Armor and Golf Iconic. In previous years, she has worked with TaylorMade, Adidas, Vivacity and Vita Coco.

She owns a golf and lifestyle blog with Armana Christianson (professional golfer). Their blog was established in January 2018. They created this blog to help inspire others in golf, especially women.

In addition, she currently runs social media for her parents companies DePalma Enterprises and H.I.S.C, a Division of DePalma Enterprises. (They sell gardening, brooms and floral supplies at trade shows and on QVC) and is a Rodan and Fields Consultant.
