= Runa Foundation =

Non-profit organization

- Founded: 2010
- Type: Non-profit organization
- Purpose: Conservation; Community Development; Indigenous People
- Location: New York, NY; Ecuador; Peru
- Region served: Amazon and Tropical Andes
- Key people: Tyler Gage, Eliot Logan-Hines, Dan MacCombie
- Revenue: US$833,134 (2016)
- Website: http://www.runafoundation.org

Runa Foundation is a public, non-profit organization with offices in Brooklyn, NY; Quito, Ecuador; Archidona, Ecuador; and Tarapoto, Peru. Runa Foundation's stated mission is to "create new value for tropical forests that benefit local people and the forest ecosystem". Runa Foundation is a 501(c)(3) non-profit corporation registered in the state of Rhode Island.

== History ==
Runa Foundation was co-founded in 2010 by Tyler Gage, Dan MacCombie, and Eliot Logan-Hines. Runa Foundation was created as the non-profit arm of the Runa Group which is a hybrid social enterprise consisting of both non-profit and for-profit arms. Runa's innovative model is designed to create big impact through the creation of new supply chains, while simultaneously assuring that these supply chains deliver tangible social and environmental benefits to local farmers and the forest.

In 2013, actor Channing Tatum became a major supporter of Runa Foundation after a long adventure into the Ecuadorian Amazon to visit the Sapara people.

== Program areas ==
Landscapes Program – This program looks at the intersection between agriculture, forestry, and conservation using a holistic landscape approach. Runa Foundation focuses particularly on the use of agroforestry and sustainable forest management as tools to conserve biodiversity and natural ecosystems. This program also includes projects related to reforestation, wildlife management, GIS mapping, territorial mapping, and assuring indigenous land rights.

Livelihoods Program – This program focuses on improving the livelihoods of local people through income generation, capacity building workshops, and financial literacy training. This program specifically targets farmers associations or cooperatives to support them in Fair Trade certification.

Plant Research – Runa Foundation works with indigenous groups in the Amazon to document and research their vast knowledge of medicinal plant uses. Runa Foundation has also helped to support the creation of PlantMed.Org dedicated to the creation of Amazonian research clinics in the Peruvian and Ecuadorian Amazon.

Education – Runa Foundation provides educational opportunities for future social entrepreneurs and environmental leaders through its internship program. Runa Foundation has partnered with the Universidad San Francisco de Quito and the Yale School of Forestry to conduct ongoing research related to forest conservation and agroforestry management. In 2014, Runa Foundation established a research fellowship with Yale University's Tropical Resources Institute.

== Funding ==
Runa Foundation is primarily funded from government grants, private foundations, and individual contributions. In 2014, Runa Foundation's total revenue was US$978,000.

Funders of Runa Foundation include:

- John D. and Catherine T. MacArthur Foundation
- Mulago Foundation
- Finnish Foreign Ministry
- USAID
- Inter-American Institute for the Cooperation in Agriculture
- World Wide Fund for Nature (WWF)
- Flemish Fund for Tropical Forests
- GIZ
- Fundacion CRISFE
- CAF – Development Bank of Latin America and the Caribbean
- Rainforest Action Network
- Rufford Foundation
- Nourish International
- Inter-American Development Bank
- Annenberg Foundation
