= Vita Coco =

American beverage company

Coordinates: 40.7384°N 73.9882°W

The Vita Coco Company
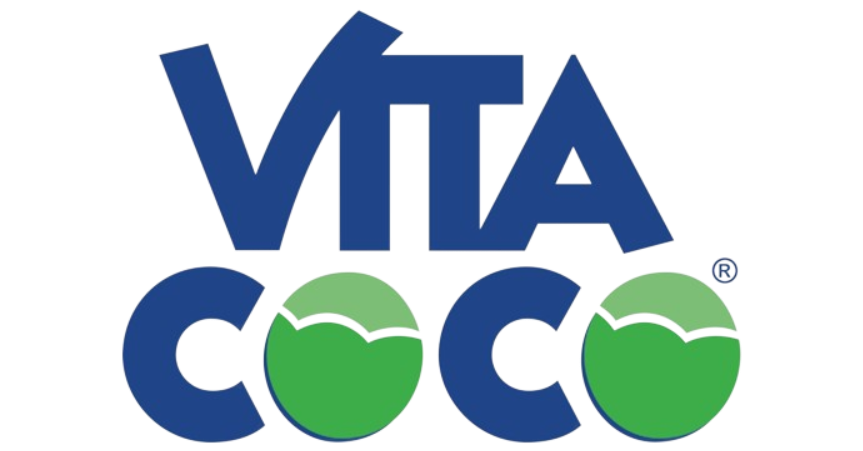
- Trade name: The Vita Coco Company
- Type: Public
- Traded as: Nasdaq: COCO; S&P 600 component
- Industry: Drink
- Founded: 2004; 22 years ago
- Founder: Michael Kirban; Ira Liran
- Headquarters: 111 5th Ave, New York City, NY 10003
- Brands: Vita Coco; Runa; Ever & Ever; PWR LIFT
- Revenue: ▲US$427.79M (2022)
- Owner: All Market Inc.
- Website: vitacoco.com

The Vita Coco Company, doing business simply as Vita Coco, is an American beverage company which mainly sells coconut water. The largest brand globally in coconut/plant waters, Vita Coco has operations in 31 countries as of 2016. It is a benefit corporation. The company is owned by All Market Inc.

== History ==
Vita Coco was started after Michael Kirban and Ira Liran met two Brazilian women in a New York City bar in 2003 and asked them what they had missed the most about their home country, with them answering coconut water. Noticing that there could be a potential business in bringing the drink to the States, the two thought about starting a business, but Liran sold everything he owned, married one of the Brazilian women, and went to Brazil. On a visit to Brazil to see Liran, Kirban noticed the prevalence of coconut water in many of the stores he went to, and decided to enlist Liran's help to start the company, succeeding in 2004.

The two found a local co-manufacturer and a distributor centered in lower Manhattan and Brooklyn, and Kirban roller-skated through neighborhoods, selling the drink and offering samples. In 2009, the Coca-Cola Company and PepsiCo entered the market via acquisitions of Zico and O.N.E., respectively, sparking "The Coconut Water Wars." Vita Coco ended up defeating the competitors and held its place as the brand with the largest market share. The company, which mainly sourced its coconuts from Brazil, expanded its operations to Southeast Asia, starting in the Philippines. The brand was initially laughed at due to the status of coconut water in these countries as a byproduct, but they consented to an offer for the right equipment in exchange for a long-term exclusive supply agreement. After the Philippines, the company contacted coconut farmers in Sri Lanka, Indonesia, Malaysia, and Thailand and offered the same contract.

Starting in 2014, the company built almost 30 schools, offered numerous scholarships, and trained farmers to be very efficient through The Vita Coco Project. This allowed Vita Coco to become a benefit corporation. In 2017, PepsiCo attempted to buy All Market Inc., the owner of Vita Coco, but did not meet the price All Market sought, which was at least $1 billion. Previously, Reignwood Group, the owner of Red Bull China, bought a 25% stake in All Market in 2014.

The packaging and logo became more simplified in 2019, to show the growth of the brand since it had started. The company got an over 100% boost in sales during the COVID-19 pandemic. In 2021, it had a 46% market share. Vita Coco also went public in 2021, debuting on the Nasdaq as COCO. In 2023, it partnered with DoorDash to create The Hangover Store, which sold items to help null the effects of a hangover, including coconut water.

== Products ==
=== Coconuts ===
Vita Coco's coconut water is mainly sourced from Asia, with two-thirds coming from the continent and the other third being from Latin America.

The original coconut water also comes in Pineapple and Peach & Mango flavors.

There are six main variations of coconut water, not including flavors:

- Pressed, which has more coconut flavor
- Coconut Juice, which comes in a can and contains the pulp
- Milk, which is coconut milk, has no dairy
  - Comes in Original and Vanilla flavors
  - The Barista variety is creamy and is meant to be added to coffee. It is also a partnership with coffeehouse chain Alfred Coffee.
- Farmers Organic, which uses only organic coconuts
- Boosted, which is caffeinated
- Super Sparkling, which is carbonated

The company also sells a drink mix which is designed to stimulate hydration, containing antioxidants, vitamins, and electrolytes. It comes in Watermelon, Orange, Lemon Lime, and Coconut flavors. In a collaboration with rum brand Captain Morgan and Jamaican singer Shenseea, Vita Coco created Vita Coco Spiked in 2023, which was available in Piña Colada, Strawberry Daiquiri, and Lime Mojito.

Vita Coco partnered with the Australian café chain Bluestone Lane in June 2023 to create the Coconut Water Cold Brew, which combined the chain's signature Flagstaff brew with coconut water from Vita Coco. It was sold only in Bluestone Lane's cafés.

In 2024, Century Pacific Food entered into a multiyear coco product contract to supply Vita Coco with 90 million liters of coconut water until 2029. "The contract covers additional volume requirements by Vita Coco, which will entail new capacity requiring a capital expenditure investment of some $40 million creating 1,500 manufacturing jobs", CNPF Vice President Noel Tempongko Jr. said. The new contract is supplemental to the 2020 agreement. "Our mutual ambition to serve consumers better with healthier products has taken us to new heights in innovation and quality," Vita Coco CEO Jonathan Burth stressed.

=== Other products ===
In addition to the coconut water which the brand is known for, the company has other side products such as Runa, a sports drink mixed with Ilex guayusa, a caffeinated holly tree, which it acquired in 2018, Ever & Ever, aluminum-canned water, and PWR LIFT, water infused with protein, which were founded in 2019 and 2021, respectively.

== Philanthropy ==
Vita Coco donated $1 million to No Kid Hungry and Feeding America during the COVID-19 pandemic, as they had a surplus of money from the jump in sales.

In September 2023, to celebrate National Coconut Day, Vita Coco partnered with the video game Roblox to create The Coconut Grove, which educates players on coconuts. People can also plant virtual coconut seedlings, and each seedling planted will cause the company to donate $1 to a charity in Brazil. In addition, in-game purchases will go to the Seedlings for Sustainability program, which is a part of the Vita Coco Project. It aims to deliver 10 million coconut seeds and trees all over the globe by 2030.

== Advertising ==
=== Celebrity endorsements ===
Vita Coco has had many celebrities endorse its product, including Madonna, Anthony Kiedis, Rihanna, Alex Rodriguez, Maroon 5, Becky G, and Anna DePalma.

== Controversies ==
In 2012, Vita Coco was sued for alleged false advertising, saying the company exaggerated and falsified claims of health advantages and nutritional content. It was alleged that the drink was not as hydrating as less expensive sports drinks and sometimes did not contain as many electrolytes, magnesium, and sodium as advertised. Vita Coco denied any fault but agreed to a settlement that involved various aspects with a value reported at around $10 million.

In October 2023, a purchaser uploaded three viral videos on TikTok that showcased mold inside of the drink container. The company responded by saying that the pack the drinks came from was likely damaged in transit.
