= James Carriger Paine =

American judge

Senior Judge of the United States District Court for the Southern District of Florida
- In office May 20, 1992 – March 7, 2010

Judge of the United States District Court for the Southern District of Florida
- In office October 5, 1979 – May 20, 1992
- Appointed by: Jimmy Carter
- Preceded by: Seat established by 92 Stat. 1629
- Succeeded by: Daniel T. K. Hurley

Personal details
- Born: James Carriger Paine; May 20, 1924 Valdosta, Georgia
- Died: March 7, 2010 (aged 85) Palm Beach, Florida
- Education: University of Florida (AA); Columbia Business School (BS); University of Virginia School of Law (LLB)

James Carriger Paine (May 20, 1924 – March 7, 2010) was a United States district judge of the United States District Court for the Southern District of Florida.

== Education and career ==
Born in Valdosta, Georgia, Paine received an Associate of Arts degree from the University of Florida in 1943. He received a Bachelor of Science degree from Columbia Business School in 1947. He received a Bachelor of Laws from the University of Virginia School of Law in 1950. He was in the United States Naval Reserve from 1943 to 1946. He was in private practice of law in West Palm Beach, Florida from 1950 to 1979.

== Federal judicial service ==
Paine was nominated by President Jimmy Carter on July 12, 1979, to the United States District Court for the Northern District of Florida, to a new seat created by 92 Stat. 1629. He was confirmed by the United States Senate on October 4, 1979, and received his commission on October 5, 1979. He assumed senior status on May 20, 1992, serving in that status until his death on March 7, 2010, in Palm Beach, Florida.

== Notable cases ==
While a judge on the district court, Paine presided over several notable cases, including

- The trial of the Seminole leader James E. Billie on charges of killing an endangered Florida panther.
- The trial of John Piazza for NFL match-fixing.
- The revocation of U.S. citizenship proceedings of Bohdan Koziy.
- The trial of stockbroker Leslie Roberts on mail fraud and conspiracy charges.

Legal offices
Preceded by Seat established by 92 Stat. 1629	Judge of the United States District Court for the Southern District of Florida; 1979–1992	Succeeded by Daniel T. K. Hurley
