= Daniel T. K. Hurley =

American judge (born 1943)

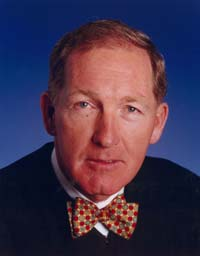

Senior Judge of the United States District Court for the Southern District of Florida
- Incumbent
- Assumed office February 24, 2009

Judge of the United States District Court for the Southern District of Florida
- In office March 11, 1994 – February 24, 2009
- Appointed by: Bill Clinton
- Preceded by: James Carriger Paine
- Succeeded by: Kathleen M. Williams

Personal details
- Born: February 24, 1943 (age 83) Fitchburg, Massachusetts, U.S.
- Education: Saint Anselm College (AB); George Washington University (JD)

Daniel Thomas Kozaki Hurley (born February 24, 1943) is a senior United States district judge of the United States District Court for the Southern District of Florida.

== Early life and education ==
Hurley was born in Fitchburg, Massachusetts. Both sides of his family were of Irish ancestry; they had immigrated to the United States and settled in Fitchburg after the Great Famine of Ireland.

Hurley had decided to become a Catholic priest in the eighth grade. He attended a Catholic high school (where he was senior class president) before attending Saint Anselm College, where he was student government president. After receiving his Artium Baccalaureus degree from Saint Anselm in 1964, Hurley attended St. Vincent de Paul Regional Seminary, a Catholic seminary in Boynton Beach, Florida operated by the Diocese of Miami After a year at seminary, Hurley was sent to Washington, D.C., to work toward a master's degree in marriage counseling. Working in Washington led Hurley to change career paths. He entered George Washington University Law School, and while he was a law student, he worked as a legislative aide, in the House Post Office, and attended sessions of Congress and the Supreme Court. Hurley received his Juris Doctor in 1968.

== Career ==
Hurley served as a law clerk for Judge John H. Pratt of the United States District Court for the District of Columbia from 1968 to 1969 and for Judge Roger Robb of the United States Court of Appeals for the District of Columbia Circuit in 1969. In 1969 Hurley was a volunteer for the Vietnam Moratorium Committee.

From 1970 to 1972 Hurley was assistant county solicitor for Palm Beach County, Florida. From 1973 to 1975 Hurley was assistant state attorney for the Fifteenth Judicial Circuit of Florida and from 1975 to 1977 Hurley served as a judge on the county court of Palm Beach County. Hurley served as a judge on the Fifteenth Judicial Circuit from 1977 to 1979, on the Florida Fourth District Court of Appeal from 1979 to 1986, and again on the Fifteenth Judicial Circuit from 1986 to 1994. The return to circuit court was unusual; this was because Hurley missed the human contact of the trial court and disliked the isolation of the appellate court.

== Federal judicial service ==
President Bill Clinton nominated Judge Hurley to the United States District Court for the Southern District of Florida on November 10, 1993, to the seat vacated by James Carriger Paine. He was confirmed by the United States Senate on March 10, 1994, and he received his commission on March 11, 1994. He assumed senior status on February 4, 2009 and retired around 2018.

=== E-waste recycling case ===
In 2018, Hurley ruled that Eric Lundgren, a California man who built a sizable business out of recycling electronic waste, had infringed upon Microsoft's products, valuing restore disks Microsoft themselves provided for free at $700,000. Despite the fact that the disks could only be used on machines already having a valid license and provided for free, Hurley ruled that the disks could be valued at $25 a piece, qualifying Lungren for a 15-month prison sentence and a $50,000 fine.

Hurley also denied Lundgren's request to remain free pending his appeal, but the U.S. Court of Appeal for the 11th Circuit granted the request as Lundgren was about to surrender for imprisonment. Hurley retired shortly after sentencing Lundgren.

In an unpublished per curiam opinion issued April 11, 2018, the Eleventh Circuit Court of Appeal ultimately affirmed Lundgren's conviction and sentence. United States of America v. Eric Lundgren, Eleventh Circuit Case No. 17-12466.

"I don't think anyone in the courtroom understood what a restore disk was," Lundgren said.

Legal offices
Preceded by James Carriger Paine	Judge of the United States District Court for the Southern District of Florida; 1994–2009	Succeeded by Kathleen M. Williams
