= Century Pacific Food =

Philippine multinational food processing company

Century Pacific Food, Inc.
- Trade name: Century Pacific Food
- Type: Public (since May 6, 2014)
- Traded as: PSE: CNPF
- Industry: Food processing
- Predecessors: Century Canning Corporation (1978–2013); Columbus Seafoods Corporation (1994–2013); The Pacific Meat Company, Inc. (1995–2013)
- Founded: October 25, 2013; 12 years ago
- Founder: Ricardo S. Po, Sr.
- Headquarters: 7/F Centerpoint Building, Julia Vargas Avenue, corner Garnet Road, Ortigas Center, Pasig, Metro Manila, Philippines
- Area served: Worldwide
- Key people: Christopher T. Po (Executive Chairman); Teodoro Alexander T. Po (Chairman, President & CEO); Ricardo Gabriel T. Po (Vice Chairman); Gregory H. Banzon (EVP & COO)
- Products: Canned tuna; Canned meat; Instant coffee; Dairy products; Non-dairy creamer; Condiments; Frozen foods; Pet foods; Beverages
- Revenue: ▲ ₱62.2 billion (2023)
- Operating income: ▲ ₱1.5 billion (2023)
- Net income: ▲ ₱3.2 billion (2023)
- Total assets: ▲ ₱3.5 billion (2023)
- Total equity: ▲ ₱28.20 billion (2023)
- Number of employees: 1,000 (2023)
- Parent: Century Pacific Group, Inc.
- Divisions: RSPo Foundation, Inc.
- Subsidiaries: General Tuna Corporation; Snow Mountain Dairy Corporation
- Website: www.centurypacific.com.ph

Century Pacific Food, Inc. (CNPF) is a Philippine multinational food processing company headquartered in Ortigas Center, Pasig. It is a wholly owned subsidiary of Century Pacific Group, Inc.

== History ==
On October 25, 2013, Century Pacific Food, Inc. was incorporated as a subsidiary of Century Pacific Group, Inc. (formerly Century Canning Corporation) to consolidate the food manufacturing portfolio of the Century Pacific Group. It became listed on the Philippine Stock Exchange on May 6, 2014. The parent company, Century Pacific Group, Inc., was established by Ricardo S. Po, Sr. (1931–2021) on December 12, 1978 as Century Canning Corporation, whose primary business was the distribution and sales of canned and processed fish products derived from tuna, sardines, and milkfish.

In 2024, Century Pacific Food entered into a multiyear coco product contract to supply Vita Coco with 90 million liters of coconut water until 2029. "The contract covers additional volume requirements by Vita Coco, which will entail new capacity requiring a capital expenditure investment of some $40 million creating 1,500 manufacturing jobs", CNPF Vice President Noel Tempongko Jr. said. The new contract is supplemental to the 2020 agreement. "Our mutual ambition to serve consumers better with healthier products has taken us to new heights in innovation and quality," Vita Coco CEO Jonathan Burth stressed.

=== Century Tuna Superbods ===
On April 27, 2024, CNPF, led by Gregory H. Banzon and Kylie Verzosa, presented the 18 men and 18 women Century Superbods 2024 finalists from the biennial auditions focusing on "Best You Ever" campaign in Market! Market!. Robi Domingo announced revealed that the 36 will join the to the July Finals including wildcards Inka Magnaye and Imelda Schweighart, Justine Felizarta and Clare Dacanay, among others.

== Brands ==
- 555
- Angel
- Argentina
- Birch Tree
- Blue Bay (from RFM Corporation in 2001)
- Century Quality
- Century Tuna
- Choco Hero
- Coco Mama
- Fresca
- Goodest
- Home Pride
- Hunt's (from Universal Robina Corporation in 2017, under license from Conagra Brands)
- Kaffe de Oro
- Ligo
- Lucky 7
- Proteus
- Shanghai
- Swift (from RFM Corporation in 2012)
- unCheese
- unMeat
- Vita Coco (distribution)
- Wow

== Subsidiaries ==
- General Tuna Corporation
- Snow Mountain Dairy Corporation
- Allforward Warehousing, Inc.
- Century Pacific Agricultural Ventures, Inc.
- Century Pacific Seacrest, Inc.
- Century Pacific Food Packaging Ventures, Inc.
- Pacific Meat Company, Inc.
- Centennial Global Corporation
- Century Pacific North America Enterprises, Inc.
- Millennium General Power Corporation
- General Odyssey, Inc.
- Coco Harvest, Inc.

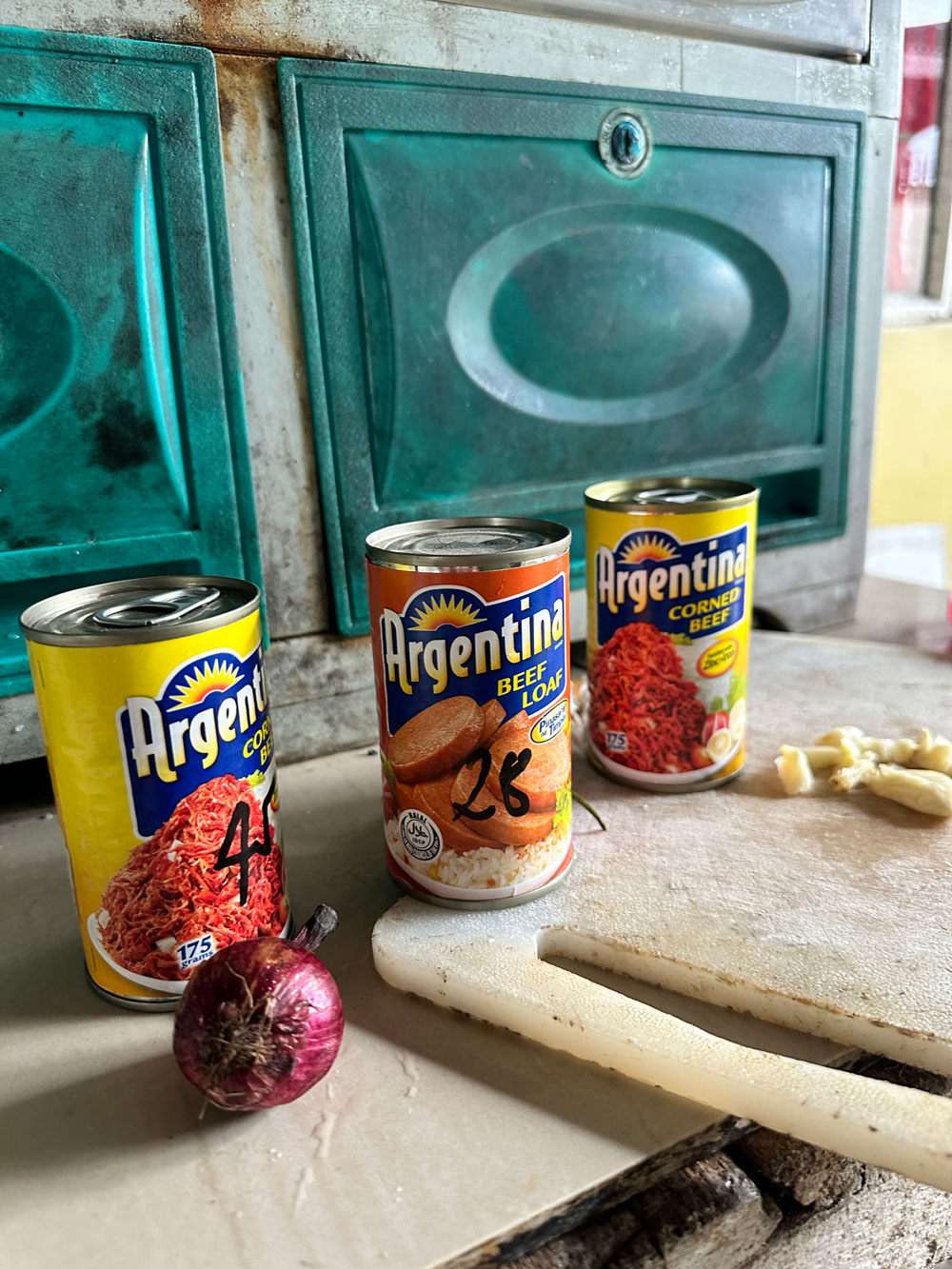
Argentina Products about to be cooked in the Philippines

== Awards and recognition ==
Century Pacific Food, Inc. successfully completed its initial public offering in 2014, which was awarded as the Best Deal in the Philippines by Asset Publishing & Research Ltd. The company was also recognized as Best Managed Small Cap Company in the Philippines in 2016 by Asia Money and Philippines’ Best Mid Cap Company in 2017-18 by Finance Asia.
