= Charles Littlejohn =

American IRS contractor and convicted leaker (born 1985)

Charles Edward Littlejohn (born 1985) is a former American Internal Revenue Service (IRS) contractor who leaked tax records from Donald Trump and other wealthy individuals in what has been called the largest data breach in IRS history.

== Early life and education ==
Littlejohn grew up in St. Louis, Missouri, and attended Crossroads College Preparatory School. He majored in economics and physics at University of North Carolina at Chapel Hill, where he helped establish Nourish International and worked on a project evaluating peanut processing in Uganda. He moved to Washington, D.C. after graduating, where he started an online poker business and worked for Booz Allen as an IRS contractor. In 2012–2013, he relocated to St. Louis when his sister was diagnosed with acute myeloid leukemia. He later lived in Delaware with his grandfather, a decorated World War II veteran, to care for him following a stroke.

== Leaks ==
Littlejohn was rehired as an IRS contractor in 2017. The first leak of IRS data targeted 15 years of Donald Trump's tax returns, which he shared with The New York Times (initially identified as "News Organization 1" in the criminal complaint) between August and October 2019.

The story was released in a series of articles by The New York Times in September 2020. It revealed that Trump had paid only $750 in federal income tax in both 2016 and 2017, and in some years paid no federal income tax due to losing more money than he made. Reporting showed no known connections with Russia, as had been previously speculated, but found "potential and often direct conflict of interest" between Trump's businesses and the office of the President of the United States.

The second data leak targeted 15 years of tax records belonging to approximately 7,600 of the highest net worth individuals in the United States. Littlejohn shared the data with ProPublica due to its 2018 reporting on the inequity of IRS scrutiny. The data was used for a June 2021 series that revealed that many of the wealthiest Americans pay little or no taxes.

The number of taxpayer records Littlejohn is reported to have leaked has increased since first reported from 7,600 to 405,427. The first increase in reported records leaked was on April 26, 2024, when Morgan Lewis reported "more than "70,000 companies and individuals" were impacted. In May 2024, the IRS announced it was sending Letter 6613 to taxpayers whose information may have been disclosed by Littlejohn. The IRS saw no indication that Littlejohn had leaked the information "outside of the two news organizations". In its press release, the IRS did not indicate the number or detail of records leaked. In 2025, House Judiciary chair Jim Jordan announced that Littlejohn had compromised the tax records of 405,427 tax entities, "approximately 89%" of which were businesses, presumably linked to the 70,000 individual taxpayers reported earlier. Jordan's source, Douglas O’Donnell, the acting IRS commissioner, retired three days later.

== Legal proceedings ==
In October 2023, Littlejohn pleaded guilty to the unauthorized disclosures of income tax returns. He said he “acted out of a sincere, if misguided, belief” that he was serving the public interest. He also said he had expected to face consequences.

Judge Ana C. Reyes compared his actions to the January 6 United States Capitol attack, saying the leak represented "a threat to our democracy." Senator Rick Scott, whose data was leaked, said in testimony "every American is a victim here." In January 2024, Reyes sentenced Littlejohn to the maximum penalty of 5 years in prison on the charge of releasing the "information of Public Official A and thousands of other persons". Reyes had earlier asked Department of Justice attorneys why Littlejohn was offered a plea deal for only a single felony count, despite leaking the information of thousands of taxpayers.

Tax attorney Reuven Avi-Yonah called the sentence "harsh," particularly compared to often lower penalties for tax evasion. He recommended the sentence be reduced to the standard ten months, or commuted by Joe Biden. The Revolving Door Project and Patriotic Millionaires joined the call for presidential pardon. Littlejohn is currently assigned to the Federal Correctional Institution, Marion in Illinois with a release date of October 22, 2027. The United States Court of Appeals for the District of Columbia Circuit upheld his sentence in July 2026, finding that it was reasonable.

Billionaires Kelcy Warren and Kenneth C. Griffin filed lawsuits over disclosures of their tax information. Warren sued Booz Allen Hamilton Inc., Littlejohn's former employer, and Griffin sued the IRS and the Treasury Department.

On January 29, 2026, Donald Trump filed a lawsuit as a private citizen against the IRS and the Treasury Department over the leak of his taxes, seeking $10 billion in damages. In addition, the Treasury Department cancelled all contracts with Booz Allen, despite the company's support in prosecuting Littlejohn.
