= Trump v. Internal Revenue Service =

2026 court case

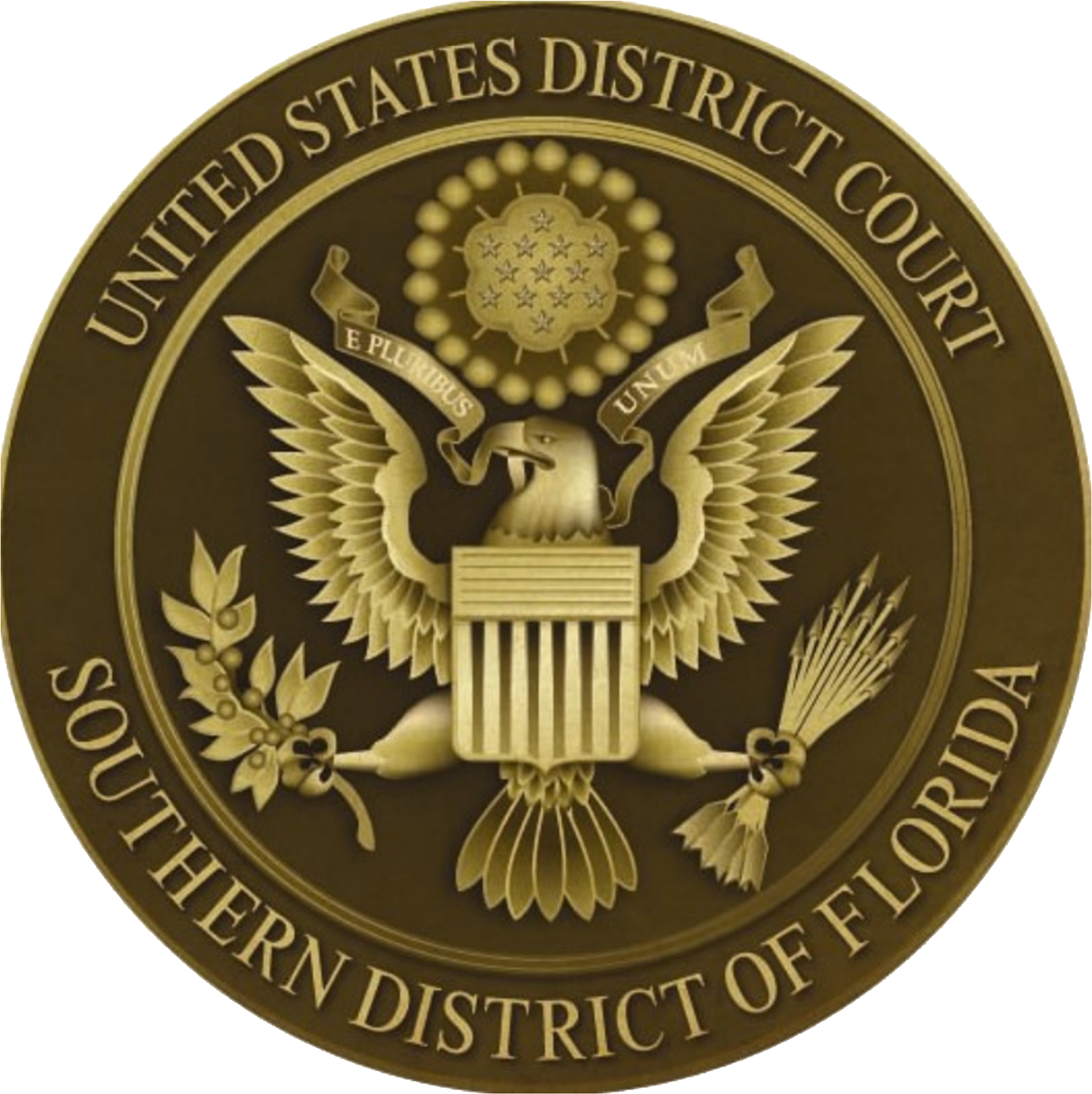
- Court: United States District Court for the Southern District of Florida
- Full case name: President Donald J. Trump, Donald J. Trump Jr., Eric Trump, and the Trump Organization, LLC. v. Internal Revenue Service and U.S. Department of the Treasury
- Submitted: January 29, 2026; 9 months ago
- Docket nos.: 1:26-cv-20609 (S.D. Fla.); 26-12692 (11th Cir.)

Case history
- Appealed to: Eleventh Circuit

Court membership
- Judge sitting: Kathleen M. Williams

President Donald J. Trump, et al. v. Internal Revenue Service and U.S. Department of the Treasury was a lawsuit brought against the Internal Revenue Service (IRS) by President Donald Trump in January 2026, alleging that the agency was responsible for his tax returns being leaked to The New York Times and ProPublica.

From 2019 to 2020, IRS contractor Charles E. Littlejohn leaked the tax returns of thousands of wealthy individuals, including Trump, to the organizations. Littlejohn was later convicted and sentenced on crimes related to the disclosures. Trump, his sons, and the Trump Organization sued the IRS and the Department of the Treasury, claiming that the IRS had not prevented Littlejohn from accessing the elder Trump's tax returns. Trump's control of the federal agencies he was suing complicated the case and presented several possible conflicts of interest.

The Department of Justice (DOJ), which represented the IRS, settled the case out of court in May 2026, and the plaintiffs voluntarily dropped the lawsuit. The settlement involved establishing a US$1.776 billion fund for individuals claiming that the DOJ had been weaponized against them. The next day, in an addendum to the settlement, acting Attorney General Todd Blanche ordered the IRS to permanently end current and possible audits and inquiries into the Trump family and business. The lawsuit and settlement fund received criticism from Democrats, Republicans, and the judge overseeing the case for its unorthodox and unprecedented circumstances. On June 2, 2026, Blanche announced retreat from the settlement fund, but continued protection of the Trump family and business against tax audits, and the DOJ eventually stated in writing that it would cease pursuing the fund.

== Background ==
In his first term, Trump refused to release his tax returns, although he promised to do so during his campaign. In 2017, Charles E. Littlejohn, a former contractor for the IRS, sought reemployment with the explicit intent to obtain Trump's tax returns. Littlejohn worked at the IRS for four years; in that time, he obtained the tax returns of thousands of wealthy individuals, including Trump. Littlejohn gave The New York Times Trump's tax returns dating back to 2005. He gave ProPublica the tax returns of the twenty-five wealthiest Americans by net worth. The New York Times used the tax returns offered by Littlejohn as the basis for an article that revealed Trump had repeatedly avoided paying income tax. In September 2023, Littlejohn was charged on one count of improperly disclosing tax return information. The following month, he pleaded guilty, and he was sentenced to five years in prison in January 2024.

Littlejohn's disclosure was investigated by the Treasury Inspector General for Tax Administration and the DOJ. The incident was criticized by some Republican Party congressmembers, who vowed to initiate investigations after Republicans secured a majority in the 2022 House of Representatives elections. In a letter to the judge who sentenced Littlejohn, Republicans on the House Committee on Ways and Means wrote that he should receive the maximum sentence for having taken "the law into his own hands and decided he knew what was best". In December 2022, the hedge-fund manager Kenneth C. Griffin sued the IRS and the Department of the Treasury in the District Court for the Southern District of Florida, alleging that the IRS was negligent in the disclosure of Griffin's tax returns. The IRS argued in court that it was not responsible for the incident as Littlejohn had acted alone. In July 2024, it apologized to Griffin, who promptly ended his lawsuit.

The disclosures were cited by Republicans on the House Ways and Means Subcommittee on Oversight in a hearing in February 2025, who criticized Democrats concerned about the possibility of security lapses at the Department of Government Efficiency. In June, Secretary of the Treasury Scott Bessent stated that he believed that the penalty for disclosing tax return information should be more severe; according to Bloomberg Tax, many wealthy individuals were dissuaded from suing the government over relatively insignificant compensation. In November, the Trump Organization sought to intervene in Littlejohn's sentencing appeal, arguing that he "severely impacted" the business. In January 2026, Bessent stated that the Department of the Treasury would end its contracts with Booz Allen Hamilton, the firm that Littlejohn had worked for. Booz Allen contested Bessent's response, noting that Littlejohn had exfiltrated tax returns off government servers and that the firm could not monitor its contractors.

== Lawsuit ==
On January 29, 2026, Trump; his sons, Donald Jr. and Eric; and the Trump Organization sued the IRS and the Department of the Treasury, making Trump the first and only sitting US president to sue his own administration. The plaintiffs claimed that the IRS failed to prevent Charles Littlejohn from accessing the elder Trump's tax returns and sought $10 billion over the incident. The case concerned whether the IRS was liable for Littlejohn's actions—as the agency had denied negligence in Ken Griffin's lawsuit—and whether the statute of limitations had elapsed; Trump filed his lawsuit exactly two years after his complaint had claimed he had heard of the disclosure, despite Littlejohn's guilty plea in October 2023. According to Bloomberg Tax, the case likely would have involved whether Littlejohn could be considered an agency employee; if not, the IRS may have had a sovereign immunity argument. Trump's appointment of agency leaders and control over the government departments which would oppose him in the lawsuit presented multiple conflicts of interest. Trump acknowledged that he was "supposed to work out a settlement with myself". He later stated that he would give any amount he received in the lawsuit to charity, naming the American Cancer Society as a possible beneficiary. The case was assigned to Judge Kathleen M. Williams.

In February 2026, several former government tax officials, including John Koskinen, the former commissioner of internal revenue, and Kathryn Keneally, the former assistant attorney general for the Tax Division, argued that the case should be placed on hold until Trump's term ends in January 2029. They said that neither Trump nor his family could prove they suffered demonstrable harm, that the demand for $10 billion in compensation was unjustified, and that Judge Williams should appoint an independent third-party. The officials noted that Alina Habba, a Trump lawyer, attended Littlejohn's guilty plea, possibly invalidating the case on the basis that the statute of limitations had elapsed. In a separate filing, Citizens for Responsibility and Ethics in Washington argued that the use of public funds to pay Trump would violate the Domestic Emoluments Clause of the Constitution. According to The New York Times, officials within the White House and the DOJ were uncertain over how to proceed in the case; assigning a lawyer to contest the lawsuit would possibly cause a conflict of interest and could violate an executive order forcing government lawyers to accept Trump's interpretation of the law.

In April 2026, Trump's lawyers requested that Judge Williams extend a deadline to respond to the case by ninety days. The filing indicated that several federal agencies were in discussions to resolve the lawsuit. Judge Williams delayed the deadline but did not respond to Trump's request to allow for negotiations. The following week, Judge Williams questioned whether any court had jurisdiction over the lawsuit, expressing skepticism that the parties were "sufficiently adverse to each other" for subject-matter jurisdiction. She ordered the parties in the case to submit filings on the issue by the following month and appointed six private attorneys to produce a memorandum on whether the lawsuit was legitimate. According to The New York Times, lawyers at the IRS believed that the DOJ could have defended the government from the lawsuit. Lawyers at the DOJ initially believed that the conflict of interest was unavoidable, citing the rule of necessity.

=== Lawsuit responses ===
After Donald Trump filed his lawsuit, Wisconsin senator Ron Johnson argued that the IRS should have been sued, but that the United States federal government lacked $10 billion to pay Trump and his family. He called for the IRS to conduct a "robust investigation" into the individual responsible for leaking Trump's tax returns. Oregon senator Ron Wyden, the ranking member of the Senate Committee on Finance, and Massachusetts senator Elizabeth Warren, a member of the committee, sent a letter to Secretary of the Treasury Scott Bessent and Attorney General Pam Bondi requesting information on Trump's involvement in the lawsuit. In April 2026, Warren and Senate Minority Leader Chuck Schumer, as well as Maryland representative Jamie Raskin and California representative Dave Min, introduced the Ban Presidential Plunder of Taxpayer Funds Act in their respective chambers. The bill would prevent the president and vice president, as well as their families, from receiving payments from a settlement agreement involving parties they control, unless a judge appoints an independent counsel to represent the government and court proceedings are made public.

=== Voluntary dismissal of lawsuit ===
Before the issues of the suit's merits were addressed in court, the parties announced an out-of-court settlement, and the plaintiffs dropped the lawsuit on May 18, 2026. Judge Williams's order closing the case was critical of the private settlement, stating that the United States had an "obligation" to resolve the "public's strong interest in knowing about the conduct of its government and expenditure of its resources" and the "fair administration of justice". She added that the government had not gone through the procedure of ensuring that a settlement was appropriate.

== Attempted out-of-court settlement ==
=== Anti-Weaponization Fund ===
Settlement agreement

Order establishing the Anti-Weaponization Fund

On May 19, 2026, The New York Times reported that the DOJ was considering settling Donald Trump's lawsuit against the IRS, a move that would possibly involve forcing the agency to permanently end any audits of Trump, his family, and his businesses. ABC News later reported that the DOJ was considering establishing a $1.776 billion fund for Trump allies who were investigated in the Biden administration, in addition to issuing a public apology; the specific amount was chosen as a reference to the year the United States Declaration of Independence was signed. The fund would use the Department of the Treasury's Judgment Fund. According to ABC News, the DOJ was set to establish a commission to disperse the fund. The commission would have five members appointed by the attorney general, that Trump could remove without cause.

The DOJ formally announced the fund in a filing on May 18, 2026. The fund, known as the Anti-Weaponization Fund, would compensate individuals who claim that the DOJ had been weaponized against them, and is set to end in December 2028. As part of the settlement, Trump dismissed his complaints filed against the government over the FBI search of Mar-a-Lago and the Mueller special counsel investigation. According to the Justice Department, Trump and his sons would receive a formal apology, but not monetary payment or damages, although the publicly available terms of the fund do not prohibit Trump or his family from receiving payments from it, according to legal observers. A subsequent addendum issued the next day that ends active or future audits of Trump, his family and their associated and his businesses has the potential to provide a large financial benefit to Trump, an analysis by the New York Times showed.

=== Tax audits of Trump family addendum ===
Order barring the Internal Revenue Service from investigating Trump, his family and his businesses

The day following the fund's announcement, Acting Attorney General Todd Blanche issued a supplemental order to drop audits of Trump, his family, related associates, and their businesses pertaining to tax returns they have already filed. According to The New York Times, this supplemental settlement likely eliminated a dispute over a $72.9 million tax refund Trump claimed as the host of The Apprentice (2004–2017). The addendum and agreement to drop probing of Trump's taxes survived the administration's avowed reversal of the fund created by the settlement.

=== Responses to the attempted settlement ===
Democratic New York representative Alexandria Ocasio-Cortez stated that the settlement was "outright corruption", joining many Democrats, and some Republicans, who referred to it as a slush fund. The settlement fund was met with skepticism from Republican Maine senator Susan Collins and Republican Kansas senator Jerry Moran, who oversee the Senate Committee on Appropriations. Republican Senate Majority Leader John Thune cast doubt on the fund. In an amicus brief in the lawsuit after the settlement was reached, over ninety Democrats in the House of Representatives wrote that Article Three of the Constitution required the court to dismiss the settlement. Raskin introduced legislation that would block the fund and sought Republican support. Republican representative Brian Fitzpatrick told reporters he will work to prevent the fund from going forward.

Lawsuits against the anti-weaponization fund implementation plan were quickly filed. Two police officers who were injured in the January 6 United States Capitol attack filed a lawsuit in DC federal court, arguing that the creation of the fund was a violation of the Administrative Procedures Act and that it violates a prohibition in the Fourteenth Amendment barring the government from funding insurrections. It was followed by another lawsuit, also filed in the DC federal courts, by the watchdog group Citizens for Responsibility and Ethics in Washington arguing that the fund's "secrecy provisions" conflict with public disclosure requirements. In the Eastern District of Virginia, a coalition of litigants including former January 6 prosecutor Andrew Floyd and represented by Democracy Forward filed suit, arguing that the fund violated the Appropriations Clause and other statutes and that "the Anti-Weaponization Fund is available only to claimants who assert that they were targeted by 'Democrat' administrations," and that "[n]either the First Amendment nor the Equal Protection guarantee of our Constitution countenance such blatant partiality." Another lawsuit came from a podcaster who claimed that the Administrative Procedure Act was violated, as the proposed settlement was not first published in the Federal Register, and there was no period for public comments prior to finalization.

A separate group of former IRS and DOJ officials and government watchdog groups filed another amicus brief challenging the addendum providing tax audit immunity.

In a ruling in the Democracy Forward lawsuit, U.S. District Judge Leonie M. Brinkema temporarily blocked the creation of the fund on May 29, pending a court hearing scheduled for the following week. Amid backlash, including from some Senate Republicans, the DOJ announced on June 1, 2026, that Trump would abide by this court order. In a June 1 House hearing, Blanche said "We are not moving forward with the fund, period." However, Judge Brinkema concluded that this verbal guarantee was not sufficient, and on June 12, she issued a preliminary injunction, and ordered Blanche and Bessent to submit written declarations that the fund was completely dead under penalty of perjury within a week. The DOJ responded that Blanche's statement to Congress was sufficient, and they would not be making separate declarations to the court. In light of this refusal, Brinkema ruled that the lawsuit could proceed.

=== Congressional reaction ===
In a hearing before the Senate Committee on Appropriations held May 19, 2026, Blanche defended the settlement amid broad criticism. When asked if people who had participated in the January 6 United States Capitol attack who had assaulted officers would be eligible for payments from the fund, Blanche refused to rule it out. He stated that the fund would review claims from any individual, including former President Joe Biden's son, Hunter. After the hearing, Mitch McConnell issued a statement that said: "So the nation’s top law enforcement official is asking for a slush fund to pay people who assault cops? Utterly stupid, morally wrong — take your pick."

In a subsequent hearing before a House appropriations subcommittee on June 2, Blanche backtracked on the anti-weaponization fund, but confirmed that the agreement to end ongoing or future audits of Trump, his family and his businesses would remain in force. Challenged to put his decision about the fund in writing, he declined to do so.

As the Senate began to vote on a funding bill on June 4 and 5, Republican Senators voted down amendments to block the anti-weaponization fund or institute guardrails to prevent awards to rioters convicted of attacking police officers in the January 6 United States Capitol attack. Democrats put forth a proposal to cancel the Trump family audit protections contained in the addendum, but it failed on a voice vote. Two House members have proposed to use a disharge petition motion to force a separate vote on the fund, the New York Times reported. On June 16, Senate Republicans blocked the Democrats' bill to ban the fund and nullify the tax arrangement.

=== Applicants and candidates ===
Michael Caputo, a Trump advisor, was the first to make a claim to the Anti-Weaponization Fund. Several individuals convicted of crimes relating to their involvement in the January 6 Capitol attack expressed relief at the fund. Enrique Tarrio, the former chairman of the Proud Boys, told The New York Times that the fund was a "good direction".

Lawyer Mike Howell, an ally of United States pardon attorney Ed Martin, sent a letter to Blanche declaring his "candidacy" for the commission overseeing the Anti-Weaponization Fund.

=== Fund reporting and operations ===
Many questions about the practical implementation of the two documents remained open. Though Blanche pledged in his May 2026 Senate hearing that the fund's decisions would, absent privacy considerations, be transparent, the documents themselves do not detail how these actions would be reported to the public. The decisions of the fund's five committee members, selected by Blanche with the fifth member selected "in consultation" with Congressional leadership, are irreversible. It is up to the committee members to determine their process and criteria for accepting or rejecting claims. Committee members can be replaced at any time by the Trump administration.

The fund and its operations were not subject to judicial oversight. There was a provision for a "confidential written report" to the Attorney General once a quarter, but no requirement that the report be made public. The fund was to close down a month before Trump's term ends, in December 2028.

=== Current status ===
With Blanche's statements to Congress, the Trump administration signaled that it was pulling back from its planned anti-weaponization fund, though the tax audit protections for Trump, his family and associates and his businesses would remain. In two of the lawsuits filed in reaction to the anti-weaponization fund, DOJ lawyers also told federal judges that the anti-weaponization fund was moot, but opposing attorneys pointed out that the DOJ lawyers have not promised that the plan for the fund will not be revived in the future. Attorneys for the plaintiffs in one of the cases told the court that the terms of the settlement explicitly say that the agreement between the federal government and Trump's personal lawyers can be modified only by those parties and in writing, and that no known modification document is known to exist. Additionally, Trump himself seemed to cast doubt on the finality of the decision by his acting Attorney General in an appearance on Meet The Press, when he said: "If it was up to me, I’d pay them the kind of money that they deserve. If they get it approved, that’s great. If they don’t get it approved, I’d be disappointed." Judge Leonie M. Brinkema, overseeing one of the lawsuits, extended her previously-issued temporary injunction against the fund's establishment to "until further notice" on June 12, saying "We just don’t have the absolute certainty that this fund won’t rear its head in another form." She offered to lift the injunction, provided acting Attorney General Todd Blanche and Treasury Secretary Scott Bessent signed a declaration, filed under penalty of perjury, that the fund was unequivocally dead.

Some legal observers noted that even if the anti-weaponization fund is not implemented in its original form, the DOJ already has and can still direct settlements without oversight, using mechanisms such as the Federal Tort Claims Act. Enrique Tarrio, convicted of seditious conspiracy in the January 6 Capitol attack and later pardoned by Trump, told a PBS reporter: "I believe even if this fund is killed in courts or at a congressional level, the President will find a way ... They can just settle the claims and lawsuits. That has no judicial review or congressional oversight. And it would mean a lot more money in compensation." One unnamed former DOJ official told a reporter for The Atlantic that discussions were underway within the department on ways to facilitate lawsuits against itself.

On July 31, 2026, Trump posted to Truth Social stating that his intent behind the fund was to compensate the January 6 defendants. He said "the so called 'Fund'...will not benefit me, but rather the great American Patriots... Perhaps there has never been a group of people treated so badly in our Nation’s history. ...I felt that they should be given compensation for what has been done to them." Also on July 31, lawyers representing Trump asked to stay the judge's order and filed notice that they plan to appeal the ruling.

On August 2, 2026, the Department of Justice submitted an order rescinding the order that created the fund. This was part of negotiations between Todd Blanche and the Senate, in order to move forward his confirmation as Attorney General.

=== Legality ===
In May 2026, police officer Daniel Hodges and former police office Harry Dunn, who had responded to the January 6 Capitol attack, sued Trump, Blanche, and Scott Bessent, claiming that the administration had exceeded its statutory authority in establishing the fund. The New York Times's Adam Liptak wrote that the settlement presented similar constitutional questions as a self-pardon, but that judicial challenges of the settlement may be difficult. Liptak added that the Appropriations Clause of the Constitution allowed Congress to act; in establishing the Judgment Fund, it ceded some authority to the executive branch. According to the Times, the fund appeared to violate a memorandum signed by Attorney General Pam Bondi prohibiting third-party settlements except in "limited circumstances".

There were additional legal questions relating to the audit-related addendum specifically: IRS procedures call for the mandatory audit of the president's tax returns annually, and federal law prohibits the president and other executive officers from ordering the IRS to start or stop audits. The New York Times reported that there appeared to be a carve-out in that law for the Attorney General, but some tax law experts questioned whether such an order was legally valid. A former IRS executive said the vague nature of the one-page order opened up many questions about who it applied to. The IRS currently lacks a chief counsel, and it is not clear who in the current leadership can resolve them.

== Re-opening of case and ruling ==
A group of 35 former federal judges filed a motion as amici curiae asking the Judge Williams to reopen the original case, arguing that she has the right to explore whether the settlement constituted a fraud perpetrated on the court, and on May 29, 2026, Judge Williams reopened the case in order to explore the "grievous allegations" and gave the plaintiffs two weeks to respond.

On July 13, 2026, Williams, noting that Trump controls the defendants and therefore there had never been "adverseness between the Parties", ruled that the lawsuit had been filed for an "improper purpose—to gain the imprimatur of judicial legitimacy for a 'settlement' that had no viable basis in law or fact." She forbade the parties (including Trump and the Treasury) from calling their arrangement a "settlement". She referred attorney Alejandro Brito to the Florida Bar for potential disciplinary action and limited the ability of attorney Daniel Epstein to practice in the Southern District of Florida. Williams also sent copies of her order to several other state bar associations associated with the settlement document signatories, Todd Blanche and Stanley Woodward Jr.. In addition, the order allowed for monetary sanctions in the form of attorneys’ fees reimbursable to amici curiae, including the 35 former federal judges who filed the brief precipitating the order.

Lawyers for President Trump have filed notice they will appeal the ruling.

== See also ==
- Second Trump presidency § Ethics
- Unitary executive theory
- Legal affairs of the second Trump presidency § Anti-Weaponization Fund
