= Kathleen M. Williams =

American judge (born 1956)

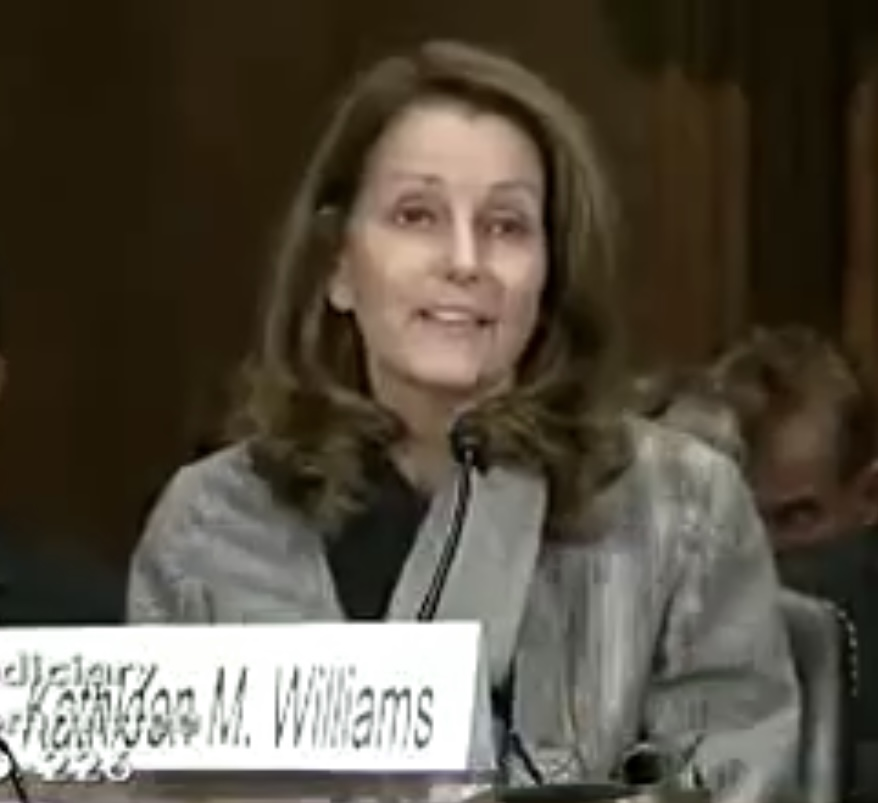

Judge of the United States District Court for the Southern District of Florida
- Incumbent
- Assumed office August 4, 2011
- Appointed by: Barack Obama
- Preceded by: Daniel T. K. Hurley

Personal details
- Born: 1956 (age 69–70) Derby, Connecticut, U.S.
- Education: Duke University (BA); University of Miami (JD)

Kathleen Mary Williams (born 1956) is United States district judge of the United States District Court for the Southern District of Florida. She previously served as the federal public defender for the Southern District of Florida.

== Early life and education ==
Williams graduated from Duke University with her Bachelor of Arts magna cum laude in history, in 1978 and from the University of Miami School of Law with a Juris Doctor in 1982.

== Career ==
Following law school graduation, Williams became a law clerk for the firm of Colson & Hicks, P.A. in Miami, Florida, from 1980 to 1982. From 1982 to 1984 she was an associate attorney with Fowler, White, Burnett, Hurley, Banick & Strickroot where she handled many aspects of insurance defense matters including legal research and writing, filing and arguing pretrial motions, and taking depositions.

In 1984, Williams was an Assistant United States Attorney for the Southern District of Florida where she prosecuted more than 50 defendants in over 20 jury trials, including two litigations involving the first Colombian defendants extradited to the United States on money laundering charges and one involving the Ochoa drug cartel. Williams was in this position until 1988. Williams became an associate attorney for the firm of Morgan, Lewis & Bockius from 1988 to 1990 and focused on white collar criminal defense.

Between 1990 and 1995, she became the Chief Assistant Federal Public Defender for the Southern District of Florida. Williams acted as lead attorney or co-counsel in approximately ten trials in defense of clients charged with crimes ranging from firearms violations to bank fraud. In 1995, Williams became the Federal Public Defender for the Southern District of Florida where she managed and directed the work of 48 Assistant Federal Defenders, 16 investigators, and over 50 support staff. Her responsibilities included all aspects of federal criminal litigation in diverse matters including immigration, narcotics trafficking, securities fraud, and terrorism cases. In 1999, at the request of the Chief Judge of the Eleventh Circuit, Williams became the Acting Federal Public Defender for the United States District Court for the Middle District of Florida while continuing to serve as the Defender for the Southern District of Florida.

=== Federal judicial service ===
On July 21, 2010, President Barack Obama nominated Williams to replace United States District Judge Daniel T. K. Hurley on the United States District Court for the Southern District of Florida. The United States Senate confirmed Williams by unanimous consent on August 2, 2011. She received her judicial commission on August 4, 2011.

==== Notable cases ====
In April 2020, Williams granted prisoner plaintiffs' request for a preliminary injunction ordering the Miami-Dade County Corrections and Rehabilitation Department to enforce social distancing, provide disinfectant, and offer testing in response to COVID-19 outbreak. Her order was then vacated by a divided panel of the United States Court of Appeals for the Eleventh Circuit in June 2020.

In August 2025, Williams ruled in favor of a coalition of environmental groups and the Miccosukee Tribe of Indians, ordering that the immigration detention facility known as Alligator Alcatraz be closed within 60 days and that no new detainees be brought to the facility, due to the irreparable harm that the facility was causing to the Florida Everglades. This ruling was stayed pending appeal by the 11th Circuit Court of Appeals.

In May 2026, Williams reopened the high-profile case Trump v. Internal Revenue Service (1:26-cv-20609), in which President Donald Trump, his sons, and the Trump Organization had sued the Internal Revenue Service for $10 billion over the leak of his tax returns. After the parties reached a settlement creating a controversial $1.8 billion "anti-weaponization fund" and voluntarily dismissed the suit, Williams responded to allegations from 35 former federal judges that the litigation amounted to a fraud on the court. In June 2026, she issued further orders requiring additional briefing and hearings on whether the lawsuit was collusive and filed for an improper purpose. On July 14, Williams voided a legal agreement between President Donald Trump and federal agencies that granted him immunity from tax audits, stating in her decision that the suit had been filed for an "improper purpose." The decision explicitly prevents everyone who's involved with the case, including Donald Trump and his sons, from citing the settlement in future legal proceedings.

Legal offices
Preceded by Daniel T. K. Hurley	Judge of the United States District Court for the Southern District of Florida; 2011–present	Incumbent
