= Nourish International =

Student organization for sustainable development

- Founded: 2003
- Founder: Sindhura Citineni
- Type: Non-profit Organization
- Location: Carrboro, North Carolina
- Region served: 28 countries
- Key people: Kelly Leonhardt Phoenix, Executive Director
- Website: http://www.nourish.org/

Nourish International is a student organization across college and high school campuses to connect students with sustainable development initiatives worldwide.

== History ==
In 2003, Sindhura Citineni and other students founded the group Hunger Lunch at the University of North Carolina at Chapel Hill. They sold plates of rice, beans and cornbread on a weekly basis to raise funds for a nutrition NGO in Hyderabad, Citineni's hometown. In 2005, Hunger Lunch placed second in the Carolina Challenge, a business plan competition at UNC-CH. The next year, the group incorporated as a 501(c)3 non-profit with the name Nourish International, and additional chapters were established at Duke, North Carolina State University, and University of Michigan.

In each chapter, students start small businesses on their campus or nearby community, and partner directly with international organizations addressing poverty and hunger. Partner organizations must be run by locals, with additional parameters to ensure that raised funds contribute directly to the local economy. Students often visit the organizations and volunteer during summer breaks.

By 2014, there were chapters on 60 different campuses that had worked with partners in 28 countries.

== Awards ==
- 2007: Outstanding Young Alumni Award for founder Sindhura Citineni
- 2008: North Carolina Peace Prize
