= Paul Huck =

American judge (born 1940)

Paul C. Huck
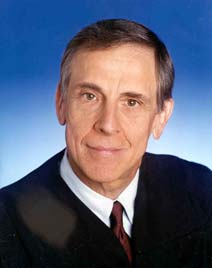

Senior Judge of the United States District Court for the Southern District of Florida
- Incumbent
- Assumed office August 31, 2010

Judge of the United States District Court for the Southern District of Florida
- In office July 11, 2000 – August 31, 2010
- Appointed by: Bill Clinton
- Preceded by: Kenneth Ryskamp
- Succeeded by: Robert N. Scola Jr.

Personal details
- Born: July 22, 1940 (age 84); Covington, Kentucky, U.S.
- Education: University of Florida (BA, JD)

Paul Courtney Huck (born July 22, 1940) is a senior United States district judge of the United States District Court for the Southern District of Florida.

== Education and career ==
Huck was born in 1940 in Covington, Kentucky. He received his Bachelor of Arts degree in 1962 from the University of Florida and his Juris Doctor from the Fredric G. Levin College of Law at the University of Florida in 1965. Huck served in the United States Army Reserve from 1965 to 1972. He was in private practice in Florida from 1965 to 2000 at the law firms Frates, Fay, Floyd & Pearson; Mahoney, Hadlow, & Adams; and Kozyak, Tropin, & Throckmorton.

Huck has taught trial advocacy as an adjunct professor at the University of Miami School of Law while serving on the district court.

=== Federal judicial service ===
He was nominated by President Bill Clinton on May 9, 2000, to the United States District Court for the Southern District of Florida, the seat having been vacated by Judge Kenneth Ryskamp. Huck was confirmed by the United States Senate on June 30, 2000, and received his commission on July 11, 2000. He assumed senior status on August 31, 2010.

=== Notable case ===
Huck has presided over the wire fraud trial of disgraced lobbyist Jack Abramoff in connection with the SunCruz Casinos sale scandal. Huck sentenced Abramoff to five years and 10 months in prison.

== Personal life ==
Huck's daughter-in-law Barbara Lagoa is a United States circuit judge on the United States Court of Appeals for the Eleventh Circuit.

== Sources ==
Legal offices
Preceded by Kenneth Ryskamp	Judge of the United States District Court for the Southern District of Florida; 2000–2010	Succeeded by Robert N. Scola Jr.
