= Judge Moreno =

Judge Moreno may refer to:

- Carlos R. Moreno (born 1948), judge of the United States District Court for the Central District of California
- Federico A. Moreno (born 1952), judge of the United States District Court for the Southern District of Florida
