= Kidan =

Kidan may refer to:

- Khitan people, ancient nomadic people who lived on the territory of present-day Mongolia and Manchuria
- Adam Kidan, American businessman
- Tesfaye Gebre Kidan (1935–2004), Ethiopian general
