= Casino Jack =

2010 Canadian film by George Hickenlooper

- Theatrical release poster
- Directed by: George Hickenlooper
- Written by: Norman Snider
- Produced by: Gary Howsam; Bill Marks; George Zakk
- Starring: Kevin Spacey; Barry Pepper; Rachelle Lefevre; Kelly Preston; Jon Lovitz; Maury Chaykin
- Cinematography: Adam Swica
- Edited by: William Steinkamp
- Music by: Jonathan Goldsmith
- Production companies: Hannibal Pictures; Rollercoaster Entertainment
- Distributed by: Entertainment One
- Release dates: September 16, 2010 (TIFF); January 28, 2011 (Canada)
- Running time: 103 minutes
- Country: Canada
- Language: English
- Budget: $12.5 million
- Box office: $1.2 million

Casino Jack (released in certain territories as Bagman) is a 2010 biographical crime drama directed by George Hickenlooper and starring Kevin Spacey. The film focuses on the career of Washington, D.C., lobbyist and businessman Jack Abramoff, who was involved in a massive corruption scandal that led to his conviction as well as the conviction of two White House officials, Rep. Bob Ney, and nine other lobbyists and congressional staffers. Abramoff was convicted of fraud, conspiracy, and tax evasion in 2006, and of trading expensive gifts, meals and vacations for political favors. Abramoff served three and a half years of a six-year sentence in federal prison, and was then assigned to a halfway house. He was released on December 3, 2010.

Spacey was nominated for a Golden Globe Award for Best Actor – Motion Picture Musical or Comedy for his portrayal of Abramoff, eventually losing to Paul Giamatti for his role in Barney's Version.

== Plot ==
A hot shot Washington DC lobbyist and his protégé go down hard as their schemes to peddle influence lead to corruption and murder.

== Cast ==
- Kevin Spacey as Jack Abramoff
- Kelly Preston as Pam Abramoff
- Rachelle Lefevre as Emily J. Miller
- Barry Pepper as Michael Scanlon
- Jon Lovitz as Adam Kidan
- John David Whalen as Kevin A. Ring
- Yannick Bisson as Oscar Carillo
- Graham Greene as Bernie Sprague
- Eric Schweig as Chief Poncho
- Maury Chaykin as Anthony "Big Tony" Moscatiello
- Christian Campbell as Ralph Reed
- Spencer Garrett as Tom DeLay
- Joe Pingue as Anthony "Little Tony" Ferrari
- David Fraser as Karl Rove
- Jeffrey R. Smith as Grover Norquist
- Daniel Kash as Gus Boulis
- Conrad Pla as FBI Agent Hanley
- Hannah Endicott-Douglas as Sarah Abramoff
- Ruth Marshall as Susan Schmidt
- Reid Morgan as Brian Mann
- Duke Redbird as Senator Nighthorse

== Production ==
Principal photography took place in June 2009 in various locations across Hamilton, Ontario, including McMaster University and downtown Hamilton. The film was scheduled for release in December 2010 and premiered at the Toronto International Film Festival.

This was Hickenlooper's final film, as he died on October 29, 2010, seven weeks before its release.

== Reception ==
On the review aggregator website Rotten Tomatoes, 39% of 97 critics' reviews are positive, with an average rating of 5.5/10. The website's consensus reads: "Kevin Spacey turns in one of his stronger performances, but Casino Jack is a disappointingly uneven fictionalized account of a fascinating true story." Metacritic, which uses a weighted average, assigned the film a score of 51 out of 100, based on 24 critics, indicating "mixed or average" reviews.

Roger Ebert gave the film three out of four stars, stating that "Casino Jack is so forthright, it is stunning."
