= George H. W. Bush judicial appointment controversies =

During George H. W. Bush's term in office as the president of the United States of America, he nominated 11 individuals for 10 different federal appellate judgeships who were not processed by the Democratic-controlled Senate Judiciary Committee. The Republicans claim that Senate Democrats of the 102nd Congress on purpose tried to keep open particular judgeships as a political maneuver to allow a future Democratic president to fill them. All 10 of the judgeships were eventually filled with Clinton nominees, although one nominee, Roger Gregory, was nominated by Clinton and then renominated by President George W. Bush. None of the nominees were nominated after July 1, 1992, the traditional start date of the unofficial Thurmond Rule during a presidential election year. Senator Orrin Hatch, the Republican leader of the Senate Judiciary Committee during the 106th Congress mentioned the controversy over President George H.W. Bush's court of appeals nominees during the following controversy involving the confirmation of any more Democratic court of appeals nominees during the last two years of President Bill Clinton's second term.

== List of unsuccessful federal judicial nominations ==
Bush made 56 nominations for federal judgeships that were not confirmed by the Senate. All 56 expired at an adjournment of the Senate, including 53 that were pending at the close of the 102nd Congress. Twenty of his unsuccessful nominees were subsequently nominated to federal judgeships by other presidents, and 18 of them were confirmed.

Nominee	Court	Nomination date	Date of final action	Final action	Subsequent federal judicial nominations	Seat filled by	Ref.
Courts of appeals
Kenneth Ryskamp	11th Cir.	April 26, 1990	August 2, 1991	returned to the president		Rosemary Barkett	
Jay Waldman	3rd Cir.	July 26, 1991	October 8, 1992	returned to the president		H. Lee Sarokin	
Franklin Van Antwerpen	3rd Cir.	September 11, 1991	October 8, 1992	returned to the president	3rd Cir. (nominated November 21, 2003, confirmed May 20, 2004)	Theodore McKee	
Lillian BeVier	4th Cir.	October 22, 1991	October 8, 1992	returned to the president		Roger Gregory	
Terrence Boyle	4th Cir.	October 22, 1991	October 8, 1992	returned to the president	4th Cir. (nominated May 9, 2001, returned December 9, 2006)	Diana Gribbon Motz	
Frank Keating	10th Cir.	November 14, 1991	October 8, 1992	returned to the president		Carlos F. Lucero	
Sidney A. Fitzwater	5th Cir.	January 27, 1992	October 8, 1992	returned to the president		Fortunato Benavides	
John Roberts	D.C. Cir.	January 27, 1992	October 8, 1992	returned to the president	D.C. Cir. (nominated May 9, 2001, confirmed May 8, 2003); SCOTUS (nominated July 29, 2005, confirmed September 6, 2005); Chief Justice (nominated September 6, 2005, confirmed September 29, 2005)	Judith W. Rogers	
John Smietanka	6th Cir.	January 27, 1992	October 8, 1992	returned to the president		Martha Craig Daughtrey	
Federico A. Moreno	11th Cir.	March 10, 1992	October 8, 1992	returned to the president		Rosemary Barkett	
Justin P. Wilson	6th Cir.	March 20, 1992	October 8, 1992	returned to the president		Karen Nelson Moore	
District courts
James R. McGregor	W.D. Pa.	October 15, 1990	August 2, 1991	returned to the president		Donetta Ambrose	
Edmund Arthur Kavanagh	N.D.N.Y.	July 25, 1991	October 8, 1992	returned to the president		Rosemary S. Pooler	
Thomas E. Sholts	S.D. Fla.	July 26, 1991	October 8, 1992	returned to the president		Wilkie D. Ferguson	
Andrew P. O'Rourke	S.D.N.Y.	November 12, 1991	October 8, 1992	returned to the president		Allen G. Schwartz	
Tony Michael Graham	N.D. Okla.	November 14, 1991	October 8, 1992	returned to the president		Terence C. Kern	
Carlos Bea	N.D. Cal.	November 20, 1991	October 8, 1992	returned to the president	9th Cir. (nominated April 11, 2003, confirmed September 29, 2003)	Claudia Ann Wilken	
James B. Franklin	S.D. Ga.	November 26, 1991	October 8, 1992	returned to the president		William Theodore Moore Jr.	
David G. Trager	E.D.N.Y.	November 27, 1991	October 8, 1992	returned to the president	E.D.N.Y. (nominated August 6, 1993, confirmed November 20, 1993)	Himself	
Kenneth R. Carr	W.D. Tex.	January 27, 1992	October 8, 1992	returned to the president		Samuel Frederick Biery Jr.	
James W. Jackson	N.D. Ohio	January 27, 1992	October 8, 1992	returned to the president		James G. Carr	
Terral R. Smith	W.D. Tex.	January 27, 1992	October 8, 1992	returned to the president		William Royal Furgeson Jr.	
Paul L. Shechtman	S.D.N.Y.	March 20, 1992	October 8, 1992	returned to the president		Deborah Batts	
Percy Anderson	C.D. Cal.	March 20, 1992	October 8, 1992	returned to the president	C.D. Cal. (nominated January 23, 2002, confirmed April 25, 2002)	Audrey B. Collins	
Lawrence O. Davis	E.D. Mo.	March 20, 1992	October 8, 1992	returned to the president		Charles Alexander Shaw	
Andrew Hanen	S.D. Tex.	March 20, 1992	October 8, 1992	returned to the president	S.D. Tex. (nominated January 23, 2002, confirmed May 9, 2002)	Janis Graham Jack	
Russell T. Lloyd	S.D. Tex.	March 20, 1992	October 8, 1992	returned to the president		Vanessa Gilmore	
John F. Walter	C.D. Cal.	March 20, 1992	October 8, 1992	returned to the president	C.D. Cal. (nominated January 23, 2002, confirmed April 25, 2002)	Richard Paez	
Gene E. Voigts	W.D. Mo.	March 24, 1992	October 8, 1992	returned to the president		Gary A. Fenner	
Manuel H. Quintana	S.D.N.Y.	March 26, 1992	October 8, 1992	returned to the president		Denny Chin	
Charles A. Banks	E.D. Ark.	April 1, 1992	October 8, 1992	returned to the president		Billy Roy Wilson	
Robert D. Hunter	N.D. Ala.	April 2, 1992	October 8, 1992	returned to the president		Charles Lynwood Smith Jr.	
Maureen Mahoney	E.D. Va.	April 2, 1992	October 8, 1992	returned to the president		Leonie Brinkema	
James S. Mitchell	D. Neb.	April 7, 1992	October 8, 1992	returned to the president		Thomas Michael Shanahan	
Ronald B. Leighton	W.D. Wash.	April 30, 1992	October 8, 1992	returned to the president	W.D. Wash. (nominated January 23, 2002, confirmed November 14, 2002)	Frank Burgess	
William D. Quarles Jr.	D. Md.	June 2, 1992	October 8, 1992	returned to the president	D. Md. (nominated September 12, 2002, confirmed March 12, 2003)	Deborah K. Chasanow	
James A. McIntyre	S.D. Cal.	June 2, 1992	October 8, 1992	returned to the president		Barry Ted Moskowitz	
Leonard Davis	E.D. Tex.	June 3, 1992	October 8, 1992	returned to the president	E.D. Tex. (nominated January 23, 2002, confirmed May 9, 2002)	John H. Hannah Jr.	
J. Douglas Drushal	N.D. Ohio	June 3, 1992	October 8, 1992	returned to the president		Lesley B. Wells	
C. Christopher Hagy	N.D. Ga.	June 3, 1992	October 8, 1992	returned to the president		Frank M. Hull	
Louis J. Leonatti	E.D. Mo.	June 3, 1992	October 8, 1992	returned to the president		Catherine D. Perry	
James J. McMonagle	N.D. Ohio	June 23, 1992	October 8, 1992	returned to the president		Solomon Oliver Jr.	
Katharine J. Armentrout	D. Md.	June 23, 1992	October 8, 1992	returned to the president		Alexander Williams Jr.	
Richard C. Casey	S.D.N.Y.	July 2, 1992	October 8, 1992	returned to the president	S.D.N.Y. (nominated July 16, 1997, confirmed October 21, 1997)	Harold Baer Jr.	
Larry R. Hicks	D. Nev.	July 2, 1992	October 8, 1992	returned to the president	D. Nev. (nominated August 2, 2001, confirmed November 5, 2001)	David Warner Hagen	
R. Edgar Campbell	M.D. Ga.	July 27, 1992	October 8, 1992	returned to the president		Willie Louis Sands	
Joanna Seybert	E.D.N.Y.	July 27, 1992	October 8, 1992	returned to the president	E.D.N.Y. (nominated September 24, 1993, confirmed November 20, 1993)	Herself	
Robert W. Kostelka	W.D. La.	August 7, 1992	October 8, 1992	returned to the president		Tucker L. Melancon	
Richard Everett Dorr	W.D. Mo.	September 9, 1992	October 8, 1992	returned to the president	W.D. Mo. (nominated March 21, 2002, confirmed August 1, 2002)	Ortrie D. Smith	
James H. Payne	E.D. Okla. N.D. Okla. W.D. Okla.	September 17, 1992	October 8, 1992	returned to the president	E.D./N.D./W.D. Okla. (nominated August 2, 2001, confirmed October 23, 2001); 10th Cir. (nominated September 29, 2005, withdrawn March 7, 2006)	Michael Burrage	
Walter B. Prince	D. Mass.	September 17, 1992	October 8, 1992	returned to the president		Richard G. Stearns	
George A. O'Toole Jr.	D. Mass.	September 24, 1992	October 8, 1992	returned to the president	D. Mass. (nominated April 4, 1995, confirmed May 25, 1995)	Reginald C. Lindsay	
William Dimitrouleas	S.D. Fla.	October 2, 1992	October 8, 1992	returned to the president	S.D. Fla. (nominated January 27, 1998, confirmed May 14, 1998)	Daniel T. K. Hurley	
Henry Saad	E.D. Mich.	October 2, 1992	October 8, 1992	returned to the president	6th Cir. (nominated November 8, 2001, withdrawn March 27, 2006)	John Corbett O'Meara	
Article IV courts
Adriane J. Dudley	D.V.I.	March 8, 1990	August 4, 1990	returned to the president		Thomas K. Moore	
Raymond L. Finch	D.V.I.	June 19, 1992	October 8, 1992	returned to the president	D.V.I. (nominated March 22, 1994, confirmed May 6, 1994); D.V.I. (nominated February 2, 2004, confirmed November 21, 2004)	Himself	

== Failed appellate nominees ==
- United States Court of Appeals for the Third Circuit
  - Pennsylvania seat - Franklin Stuart Van Antwerpen (judgeship later filled by Clinton nominee Theodore McKee) (Van Antwerpen later was nominated to a different Third Circuit seat by President George W. Bush in 2003, confirmed in 2004 and assumed senior status in 2006)
  - Pennsylvania seat - Jay Waldman (judgeship later filled by Clinton nominee H. Lee Sarokin)
- United States Court of Appeals for the Fourth Circuit
  - North Carolina seat - Terrence Boyle (judgeship later filled by Clinton nominee Roger Gregory of Virginia after being renominated by Bush in 2001) (Boyle was renominated to a different seat on the Fourth Circuit by President George W. Bush but was never confirmed)
  - Virginia seat - Lillian BeVier (judgeship later filled by Clinton nominee Diana Jane Gribbon Motz)
- United States Court of Appeals for the Fifth Circuit
  - Texas seat - Sidney A. Fitzwater (judgeship later filled by Clinton nominee Fortunato Benavides)
- United States Court of Appeals for the Sixth Circuit
  - Michigan seat - John Smietanka (judgeship later filled by Clinton nominee Martha Craig Daughtrey of Tennessee)
  - Ohio seat - Justin Wilson of Tennessee (judgeship later filled by Clinton nominee Karen Nelson Moore of Ohio, while the then-vacant and newly created Tennessee seat was eventually filled by Clinton nominee Martha Craig Daughtrey)
- United States Court of Appeals for the Tenth Circuit
  - Oklahoma seat - Frank Keating (judgeship later filled by Clinton nominee Robert Harlan Henry)
- United States Court of Appeals for the Eleventh Circuit
  - Florida seat - Kenneth Ryskamp, followed by Federico A. Moreno (judgeship later filled by Clinton nominee Rosemary Barkett)
- United States Court of Appeals for the District of Columbia
  - John Roberts (judgeship later filled by Clinton nominee Judith Ann Wilson Rogers) (Roberts was renominated and confirmed to a different seat on the D.C. Circuit under President George W. Bush; later, he was nominated and confirmed as the Chief Justice of the United States under George W. Bush)

== See also ==
- George H. W. Bush Supreme Court candidates
- United States federal judge
- Judicial appointment history for United States federal courts
- Deaths of United States federal judges in active service
