= Joseph Sonken =

American Mafia figure

Joseph Sonken (1910 – June 1990), was a notorious alleged American Mafia figure, owner of the Gold Coast Restaurant and Lounge in Hollywood, Florida.

== Biography ==
His father was Russian and his mother Polish. Before moving to Miami in the mid-1940s, Joseph Sonken was involved in a prostitution ring in Chicago. Allegations imply that Joseph Sonken was close to Al Capone and fled to Florida to flee police busts in Chicago.

In Miami, Joseph Sonken opened the Mother Kelly's nightclub and became a public figure. The nightclub went out of business in 1948, and Joseph Sonken moved to Hollywood Florida to open the Gold Coast Restaurant and Lounge. According to police reports, the Gold Coast was heavily used as a meeting point for Mafia members. Joseph Sonken denied those allegations in front of a Kefauver committee in 1968. Among the famous guests were Mafia members John Gotti, Joseph Todaro Sr., and Edward Sciandra. Public stars such as Frank Sinatra and Cary Grant were also known as regular customers, and the restaurant is mentioned in the FBI's JFK assassination files and in Elmore Leonard's novel Gold Coast.

Joseph Sonken was arrested in 1972 for illegal gambling, but those charges were dropped a month later. In 1975, he was indicted for tax evasion and acquitted by a jury trial. In 1978, The Florida Department of Law Enforcement (FDLE) tried to trick Joseph Sonken by selling him cheap groceries undercover, and later raid the Gold Coast Restaurant and Lounge claiming it is stocked with stolen groceries bought at cut-rate prices. The case was dismissed.

In May 1994, Gus Boulis bought the Gold Coast Restaurant and Lounge and flipped it into a Miami Subs Grill.

Joseph Sonken died in June 1990 at the age of 83 in Plantation, Florida.
