= Liberty City Seven =

Americans charged with domestic terrorism by the Federal Bureau of Investigation

The Liberty City Seven were seven construction workers and members of a small Miami, Florida-based religious group who called themselves the Universal Divine Saviors. Described as a "bizarre cult," the seven were arrested and charged with terrorism-related offenses in 2006 by a Federal Bureau of Investigation sting investigation although their actual operational capability was extremely low and their intentions were unclear. The members of the group operated out of a small warehouse in the Miami neighborhood of Liberty City.

Indicted in federal court and after all seven had refused to take a plea deal, three trials of the Liberty City Seven defendants took place. One defendant was acquitted in the first trial, but the jury deadlocked on the other six defendants, leading to a mistrial. The second trial also resulted in a deadlocked jury and a mistrial. On the third trial of the remaining six defendants, five were convicted on some of the counts, including the group's leader, Narseal Batiste, the only defendant to be convicted on all four charges. One more defendant was acquitted of all charges in the third trial.

The FBI first became aware of the group in October 2005 as a result of a tip given to Miami FBI Special Agent Anthony Velazquez.

One of my colleagues comes in and says, "Look I have some information from an informant that there's a group of guys in Liberty City that are conducting military training, that are interested in over throwing the U.S. government, um, and that wanna be Al-Qaeda."

A sting operation was conducted. Ultimately, the charges centered on the FBI's belief that the group was seeking money in order to commit a terrorist act. The informant posed as someone from Yemen who was willing to help their mission in Liberty City, provided they supported the al-Qaeda jihad. The FBI agents represented themselves as representatives of al-Qaeda, and persuaded Batiste to provide plans for a stated intention to destroy the Sears Tower (now Willis Tower) in Chicago, the FBI field office in Miami, and other targets. Deputy Director of the Federal Bureau of Investigation John S. Pistole described the group's plot as more "aspirational than operational"; the group did not have the means to carry out attacks on such targets. The group had no weapons and did not seek weapons when they were offered. The group had no communication with any actual al-Qaeda or other terrorist operatives. Rather, the plan was to scam the money given to them by the informant (up to $50,000 was offered) and use it to save their fledgling construction business. Never considering that the ruse was on them in order to get the money, the FBI proceeded to bait the group into saying that the money was for a violent terrorist attack thereby leading to their ultimate arrest.

== Views and beliefs ==
The groups held idiosyncratic syncretic views. Juan Cole wrote that:

It seems pretty obvious that they are just a local African-American cult which mixed Judaism, Christianity and (a little bit of) Islam. It seems to be a of [sic] vague offshoot of the Moors group founded by Dwight York. I heard on CNN that one of them talked of being Moors. And Batiste, the leader, called whites "devils" in the tradition of the original Nation of Islam and York's Moors. Now CNN is saying one member said they practiced witchcraft [likely meaning Haitian voodoo or perhaps Santería-like rituals]. One former member is called Levi-El, suggesting he might be associated with the Black Hebrew movement or an offshoot. Now a relative of one of the members, Phanor, said that they wore black uniforms with a star of David arm patch and considered themselves of the Order of Melchizadek ... This Seas of David group primarily seems to have been studying the Bible. The mother of one insisted that he is a Catholic. Then there is all that Jewish symbology and terminology, even in their names. Islam was nothing more for them but a set of symbols they could pull into their syncretic local culture. The group drew on poor Haitian immigrants and local indigent African-American youth. If this were the 1960s, they'd have been Black Panthers or Communists.

Followers wore uniforms bearing a Star of David and met for Bible study and martial arts practice.

== Members ==
Batiste was the leader of the group. He is married and he and his wife Minerva have three boys and a girl. Batiste's relatives described him as a "Moses-like" figure who roamed his neighborhood wearing a robe and carrying a crooked wooden cane as he recruited young men, based his teachings on those of the Moorish Science Temple of America.

Batiste once drove a FedEx truck in Chicago and was a member of the volunteer Guardian Angels, an anti-crime group. His father, Narcisse Batiste, sister and two of his brothers are Christian ministers. His mother Audrey Batiste died in 2000.

According to the indictment, Batiste told an FBI informant posing as an al-Qaeda member around December 16, 2005 that he was organizing a mission to build an "Islamic Army" in order to wage jihad against the United States with his "soldiers" to destroy the Sears Tower. He requested a list of materials and equipment needed to wage jihad, including boots, uniforms, machine guns, radios, and vehicles.

Around December 22, 2005, he provided said "al-Qaeda representative" with shoe sizes of his "soldiers" and received military boots a week later. Around that same time he requested radios, binoculars, bulletproof vests, vehicles and $50,000 cash.

On February 19, 2006, in a meeting with the "al-Qaeda representative," along with Patrick Abraham, he expressed interest in attending al-Qaeda training during April and gave further details of the mission to wage "a full ground war" against the United States in order to "kill all the devils we can" in a mission that would "be just as good or greater than 9/11." He requested a video camera for the trip to Chicago.

Around March 10, 2006 he along with Lyglenson Lemorin met with the FBI plant in Miami-Dade County, Florida and swore fealty to al-Qaeda. Around March 16, 2006, along with Patrick Abraham, Stanley Phanor, Naudimar Herrera, Burson Augustin, Lyglenson Lemorin, and Rotschild Augustine, Batiste met with the "al-Qaeda representative," swore an oath of loyalty to al-Qaeda and discussed plans to bomb the FBI building in five cities. At this meeting, Batiste took possession of a video camera and promised to obtain "good footage" of the North Miami Beach FBI building.

Around March 23, 2006, Batiste asked the FBI informant for a rental van for himself and his conspirators to take reconnaissance footage of the FBI building. Around March 24, 2006, Patrick Abraham drove Batiste by car by the FBI and the National Guard Armory buildings in Miami-Dade, Florida. Around the same date, they traveled with the "al-Qaeda representative" to purchase a digital camera. Around March 26, 2006, Batiste and Burson Augustin provided the FBI informant with photographs and video footage of the FBI building and the James Lawrence King Federal Justice Building, federal courthouse, Federal Detention Center, and the Miami Police Department buildings. They met again around April 6 to discuss the photographs and footage.

Around May 24, 2006, Batiste told the "al-Qaeda representative" that he was experiencing delays because of various problems within his organization but that he wanted to continue his mission and maintain his relationship with al-Qaeda.

== Investigation and arrest ==
On June 22, 2006, a grand jury indicted the seven men. They were arrested during an FBI raid on the run-down warehouse in Liberty City, Miami in which the group met.

The seven were arrested on June 23, 2006. Attorney General Alberto R. Gonzales, at a press conference that day, said that the men had been taped promising to fight a "full ground war against the United States."

The seven men named in the indictment:

- Narseal Batiste, a/k/a Brother Naz, a/k/a Prince Manna - Considered the ringleader.
- Patrick Abraham, 29, a/k/a Brother Pat
- Stanley Grant Phanor, 33, a/k/a Brother Sunni (although actually nicknamed "Sunny")
- Rotschild Augustine, 25, a/k/a Brother Rot
- Burson Augustin, 24, a/k/a Brother B
- Naudimar Herrera, 25, a/k/a Brother Naudy
- Lyglenson Lemorin, 33, a/k/a Brother Levi, a/k/a Brother Levi-El

Five were U.S. citizens, one a legal immigrant from Haiti, and the last an illegal immigrant originally from Haiti. They were accused of planning to levy a "full ground war" against the United States.

Also involved was Charles James Stewart of the Moorish Science Temple in Chicago, a convicted rapist who was paid through the FBI informant to join the group in April. He subsequently shot one of Batiste's followers and then became a witness against him and his supporters.

The two FBI informants, both Middle Eastern-born, were known as CW1, a Miami resident who had previous arrests for assault and marijuana possession, and CW2, who had worked for the FBI for six years and was awaiting approval of his petition for political asylum in the United States.

Narseal Batiste (also known by some as "Prinze Nas"), 32, is a father of four and a martial arts enthusiast, who had been a member of the Guardian Angels in Chicago.

The indictments accused the seven of being a domestic terrorist cell who plotted to blow up the Sears Tower and the FBI building in Miami and had contact with al-Qaeda to attempt a bombing of Sears Tower. Although no links to outside terrorist groups were alleged, nor any weapons found, the arrests were the subject of a high level press briefing in Washington D.C. hosted by the Attorney-General and made headline news in Europe the following day. The Director of the FBI Robert Mueller cited the incident in a "Major Executive Speech" in Cleveland that afternoon entitled "Protecting America from Terrorist Attack: The Threat of Homegrown Terrorism".

According to the indictments, the group had been infiltrated for nearly a year by two paid FBI informants posing as al-Qaeda members. The warehouse they were in had been wired for surveillance and provided rent-free by the FBI since January, and members of the group discussed the terrorist plots with the undercover agents present while smoking marijuana. Differences had broken out in April between the leaders, causing one to be arrested for shooting a follower of the other.

== Trials ==
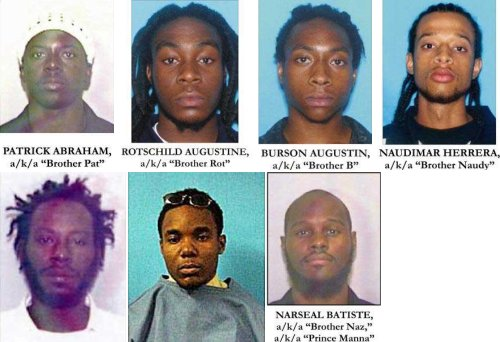
The seven men charged in the terror plot.

All seven were denied bail since their arrest. Their trial began on 2 October 2007 with the threat of up to 70 years in prison if convicted of all charges, and ended on 13 December with one defendant acquitted and the jury unable to return a verdict on the other six, for whom a retrial was scheduled for 7 January 2008. On April 16, 2008, the federal judge in the case declared a second mistrial for the six remaining defendants after the jury had been deadlocked for 13 days.

The presiding judge for all three trials was Joan A. Lenard.

The first trial began on October 2, 2007 in the United States District Court for the Southern District of Florida. Prosecutors presented evidence drawn from 15,000 FBI recordings, including one in which Narseal Batiste said they would make sure no one survived destruction of the 110-story Sears Tower, and another which features ceremony in which each member of the group swears allegiance to al-Qaeda and Osama bin Laden. The defense claimed that the men played along with the talk by the FBI informants of terrorist plots in the hope of obtaining money, and that they never constituted a credible terrorist threat. In the second week of the trial two of the jurors were dismissed after a police counter-terrorism pamphlet was found in the jury room.

The defense rested its case on November 20, 2007. The prosecution alleged that although the defendants did not have the means to carry out a terrorist attack, they "were a ready-made terrorist cell here for al-Qaeda" who sought to use their attacks on the Sears Tower to spark an insurrection, topple the government, and bring about the destruction of the United States. The first trial ended on December 13, 2007. Lyglenson Lemorin was acquitted of all charges, and on the other six the jury deadlocked, leading to a mistrial. The defense argument was that the men were playing along with the FBI agents in order to con for money.

On December 13, 2007, after nine days of deliberations, the jury acquitted Lyglenson Lemorin, who had left the group and moved to Atlanta months before the arrests but were unable to reach a verdict on the other six. The judge declared a mistrial, and the jury for a retrial was scheduled to be picked after 7 January 2008. Following Lemorin's acquittal, he continued to be detained pending a deportation proceeding in which the same charges were reexamined. Deportation is considered a civil proceeding, where double jeopardy protections do not apply and a lower standard of clear and convincing evidence is used rather than reasonable doubt. After being detained by immigration authorities for three years, in Georgia, Florida, and Louisiana, he was deported to Haiti on January 20, 2011 while his appeal to an Atlanta federal court was pending. The following April, Lemorin was not permitted to return for the funeral of the 15-year-old son he had fathered in the United States, who remained in the U.S. and was struck while trying to push a stalled vehicle off the highway.

A second trial ended on April 16, 2008, when Lenard declared a mistrial after the second jury reported that they were deadlocked after 13 days of deliberations.

A third trial ended on May 12, 2009, when following two weeks of deliberation a jury acquitted Naudimar Herrera, but convicted the five remaining defendants. During the deliberations two of the jurors were replaced. Ringleader Batiste was convicted on all four charges brought against him. Abraham was convicted on three of the four counts against him. Phanor, Augustine, and Augustin were convicted on two counts of providing material support for terrorism.

The five were sentenced on November 20, 2009 by Judge Joan Lenard after a three-day sentencing hearing:

- Narseal Batiste: 162 months in prison, followed by 35 years of supervised release;
- Patrick Abraham: 112.5 months in prison followed by 15 years of supervised release;
- Stanley Grant Phanor: 96 months in prison followed by 15 years of supervised release;
- Burson Augustin: 72 months in prison followed by 10 years of supervised release; and
- Rothschild Augustine: 84 months in prison followed by 10 years of supervised release.

== Press coverage of the arrests ==
The arrests were announced on 23 June at a high level press briefing in Washington D.C. by the Attorney-General Alberto Gonzales, the Deputy Director of the FBI John S. Pistole, and an Assistant Attorney-General Alice S. Fisher.

At the press conference, the Attorney-General and the Deputy Director took questions from reporters:

Question: Did any of the men have any actual contact with any members of al-Qaeda that you know of?
Attorney-General: The answer to that is "No".
Question: Did they have any means to carry out this plot? I mean, did you find any explosives, weapons?
Attorney-General: You raise a good point ... We took action when we had enough evidence.
Question: Was there anything against the Sears Tower other than this one apparent, just, kind of mention of the Sears Tower? It doesn't look like they ever took pictures or ...
Deputy Director of the FBI: One of the individuals was familiar with the Sears Tower, had worked in Chicago, and was familiar with the tower. But in terms of the plans, it was more aspirational than operational.

He assured the public that the men posed no actual danger because their plot had been caught in "its earliest stages", and that the group's only source of money and weapons would have been the undercover FBI agent.

The following week the incident was featured on The Daily Show, where Jon Stewart quipped: "Now, I am not a general. I don't have any association with any military academy. But I believe that if you are going to wage a full ground war against the United States, you need to field at least as many people as, say, a softball team."

Democracy Now interviewed two community activists in Miami on 26 June who summed up local reaction to the indictments:

[A] lot of show has been made about the militaristic boots that they had ... [I]t turns out ... the FBI bought them the boots. If you look at the indictment, the biggest piece of evidence ... is that the group may have taken pictures of a bunch of targets in South Florida. But the guys couldn't afford their own cameras, so the federal government bought them the cameras ... The federal government rented them the cars that they needed to get downtown in order to take the pictures. In addition ... the men provided the FBI informant with a list of things they needed in order to blow up these buildings, but in the list they didn't include any explosives or any materials which could be used to make explosives. So now everyone in Liberty City is joking that the guys were going to kick down the FBI building with their new boots, because they didn't have any devices which could have been used to explode ...

In his afternoon speech, the Director of the FBI, Robert Mueller, cited the case to illustrate how his department's policies were working. He also made reference to the case of Kevin James, the Toledo terror plot, and the 2006 Toronto terrorism case.

== FBI payments ==
- The first informant, CW1, received $10,500 for his services and $8,815 in expenses.
- The second informant, CW2, received $17,000 and approval of his petition for political asylum in the United States.
- Expenses for Charles James Stewart and his wife to travel from Chicago to Miami came to $3,500
- Rent paid on the warehouse used for training from January to June.

The trial information revised these figures

- First informant, Abbas al Saidi, received $40,000.
- Second informant, Elie Assad, received $80,000.

== Media ==
The case was one of a type that inspired Chris Morris in the making of the 2019 film The Day Shall Come.
