= Israel on Trial =

2026 book

Israel on Trial: Examining the History, the Evidence, and the Law
- Author: Roy Altman
- Publication date: April 28, 2026
- ISBN: 979-8-891-88636-0

Israel on Trial: Examining the History, the Evidence, and the Law is a 2026 book by United States District Judge Roy Altman.

== Background ==
Altman is a Venezuelan-born, Jewish American jurist in Miami, Florida. In the aftermath of the October 7 attacks in 2023, Altman has led several delegations of United States judges to Israel.

== Summary ==
The book examines six allegations levied at Israel through legal methodology:

- Jews are colonists in the Land of Israel
- the founding of the State of Israel was illegitimate
- Israel has prevented the establishment of a Palestinian state
- Israel was occupying Gaza on October 7, 2023
- Israel had turned Gaza into an "open-air prison"
- Israel is an apartheid state
- Israel committed genocide in Gaza

== Reception ==
Michael M. Rosen, writing on Commentary, wrote that the book was a "succinct, convincing, and important contribution to the body of legal literature concerning the Jewish state."
