= Federico A. Moreno =

Venezuelan-American judge (born 1952)

Senior Judge of the United States District Court for the Southern District of Florida
- Incumbent
- Assumed office July 17, 2020

Chief Judge of the United States District Court for the Southern District of Florida
- In office July 1, 2007 – June 30, 2014
- Preceded by: William J. Zloch
- Succeeded by: K. Michael Moore

Judge of the United States District Court for the Southern District of Florida
- In office July 16, 1990 – July 17, 2020
- Appointed by: George H. W. Bush
- Preceded by: Alcee Hastings
- Succeeded by: David S. Leibowitz

Judge of the Eleventh Judicial Circuit Court of Florida
- In office 1987–1990

Judge of the Dade County Court
- In office 1986–1987

Personal details
- Born: April 10, 1952 (age 74) Caracas, Venezuela
- Education: University of Notre Dame (BA); University of Miami School of Law (JD)

Federico A. Moreno (born April 10, 1952) is a senior United States district judge of the United States District Court for the Southern District of Florida.

== Early life and education ==
Moreno was born in Caracas, Venezuela, the son of Francisco and Réjane Moreno. He graduated from the University of Notre Dame with a Bachelor of Arts degree in 1974 and from the University of Miami School of Law with a Juris Doctor in 1978. He served as the inspiration for the character D-Bob in the film Rudy, where he was portrayed by actor Jon Favreau. Moreno and the real Rudy lived in adjacent dorm rooms in 1973.

== Career ==
Moreno was in private practice in Miami from 1978 to 1979. He served as assistant federal public defender in the Office of the United States Public Defender from 1979 to 1981 before returning to private practice in Miami from 1982 to 1986. Moreno served as a judge on the Dade County Court from 1986 to 1987. He served as a judge on the 11th Judicial Circuit Court from 1987 to 1990. In addition to his current post as a United States District Judge for the Southern District of Florida, Judge Moreno serves on the Executive Committee of the Judicial Conference of the United States.

=== Federal judicial service ===
Moreno was nominated by George H. W. Bush on June 5, 1990 to the United States District Court for the Southern District of Florida to the seat vacated by Judge Alcee Hastings, who was impeached. He was confirmed by the Senate on July 13, 1990 and received his commission on July 16, 1990. Moreno served as Chief Judge on the court from 2007 to 2014. He assumed senior status on July 17, 2020.

He was named as a possible Supreme Court pick by Republican presidential candidate Donald Trump.

=== Notable rulings ===
- In early 2010, Moreno ruled that Danish citizen Camilla Broe should be released after determining that her case has expired. Broe is the first Danish citizen to be extradited to the United States. Moreno was very critical of the prosecution and of the Danish Government's handling of the case.
- In 2006, Moreno ruled that the government should not have returned 15 Cuban immigrants that were found "standing on the pilings of an abandoned bridge in the Florida Keys." The federal government argued that the bridge "was rooted under water and was not United States territory" and thus the Wet Foot-Dry Foot Policy did not apply. Moreno ordered the government to make "best efforts to help the immigrants return to the United States."
- In 2001, Moreno presided over the criminal trial of former Miami city manager Donald Warshaw. Moreno sentenced Warshaw to a year in prison, fined him $30,000, and ordered him to pay $51,000 in restitution after he was convicted of stealing $69,788 from a children's charity.
- In 2000 the Judicial Panel on Multi-District Litigation sent Moreno more than 50 lawsuits against various HMOs. In 2002, Moreno "dismissed several charges against the nation's largest health insurance companies, but he said plaintiffs could proceed with accusations that the insurers had violated federal fraud and pension laws." Moreno ruled that plaintiffs who were health plan subscribers could proceed with Racketeer Influenced and Corrupt Organizations Act fraud claims against Aetna, Cigna, United Healthcare and Humana. In 2003, Moreno ruled in favor of 700,000 doctors and against HMOs in a related case.

=== Failed nomination to the Eleventh Circuit ===
On March 9, 1992, President George H. W. Bush nominated Moreno to a seat on the United States Court of Appeals for the Eleventh Circuit, to replace Paul Hitch Roney, who had taken senior status. Bush's previous nominee for the seat, Kenneth Ryskamp, had been defeated by the United States Senate Judiciary Committee. However, the Democratic-controlled Senate Judiciary Committee did not take up Moreno's nomination before Bush's presidency ended, and President Bill Clinton chose not to renominate Moreno to the seat after he took office. Ultimately, Clinton nominated Rosemary Barkett to the seat to which Moreno had been nominated.

== See also ==
- List of Hispanic and Latino American jurists
- George H.W. Bush judicial appointment controversies
- Donald Trump Supreme Court candidates

Legal offices
Preceded by Alcee Hastings	Judge of the United States District Court for the Southern District of Florida; 1990–2020	Succeeded by David S. Leibowitz
Preceded by William J. Zloch	Chief Judge of the United States District Court for the Southern District of Florida; 2007–2014	Succeeded by K. Michael Moore
