= Joan A. Lenard =

American judge (born 1952)

Senior Judge of the United States District Court for the Southern District of Florida
- Incumbent
- Assumed office July 1, 2017

Judge of the United States District Court for the Southern District of Florida
- In office December 26, 1995 – July 1, 2017
- Appointed by: Bill Clinton
- Preceded by: James Lawrence King
- Succeeded by: Roy Altman

Personal details
- Born: Joan Amy Stember; January 7, 1952 (age 74) Amityville, New York, U.S.
- Education: Rockland Community College (AA); Roger Williams University (BA); Antioch School of Law (JD)

Joan Amy Lenard (née Stember; born January 7, 1952) is a senior United States district judge of the United States District Court for the Southern District of Florida.

== Early life and education ==
Lenard was born in 1952 in Amityville, New York. She received her Associate of Arts degree from Rockland Community College in 1972, her Bachelor of Arts from Roger Williams College in 1973, and her Juris Doctor from Antioch School of Law in 1976.

== Career ==
Lenard worked for the Office of the State Attorney in the 11th Judicial Circuit of Florida (Dade County) from 1976 to 1982, serving as assistant state attorney from 1976 to 1978, as chief of the Consumer Fraud Division from 1978 to 1980, and as chief of the Consumer and Economic Crime Division from 1980 to 1982. Lenard served as a Dade County Court judge from 1982 to 1993 and as a circuit judge for the Family Division of the 11th Judicial Circuit from 1993 to 1995.

=== Federal judicial service ===
President Bill Clinton nominated Lenard to the United States District Court for the Southern District of Florida on September 29, 1995, to the seat vacated by Judge James Lawrence King. She was confirmed by the Senate on December 22, 1995, and received her commission on December 26, 1995. She assumed senior status on July 1, 2017.

=== Notable case ===
Lenard was the presiding judge in the third trial of the Liberty City Seven, after the first two trials ended in mistrials. She has also presided over the Moisés Maionica case; the civil trial of Juan López Grijalba, a Honduran Army colonel, who was found responsible killings and kidnappings in Honduras during the 1980s and was ordered to pay $47 million to several torture victims and surviving relatives; and the case of the Cuban Five.

== See also ==
- List of Jewish American jurists

Legal offices
Preceded by James Lawrence King	Judge of the United States District Court for the Southern District of Florida; 1995–2017	Succeeded by Roy Altman
