= 2006 Toledo terror plot =

FBI investigation

In February 2006, three men in Toledo, Ohio (Mohammad Zaki Amawi, Marwan Othman El-Hindi, and Wassim Mazloum) were arrested and charged with conspiracy to provide material support to terrorists in Iraq and engage in violent jihad in their home town, as well as making verbal threats against the President of the United States. The investigation was conducted by the FBI and the Toledo Joint Terrorism Task Force, with the cooperation of an informant called 'The Trainer' who has a U.S. military background in security. The Cleveland FBI Special Agent in Charge C. Frank Figliuzzi and the U.S. attorney's general office credited the local Muslim and Arab-American community for passing along the information that led to the arrest of the three terror suspects.

During a February 2006 press briefing in Washington, DC, in the presence of the Deputy Director of the FBI John Pistole, Attorney General Alberto Gonzales accused the men of educating themselves on how to make and use explosives and suicide bomb vests by downloading videos off the internet, seeking firearm training, conspiring to provide terrorist funds abroad by using Mazloum's car dealership as a cover for traveling to and from Iraq, and making verbal threats against the President of the United States.

This plot was mentioned as one of three examples of homegrown terrorism in a speech by the director of the FBI Robert Mueller on 23 June 2006 on the morning that the Miami bomb plot to attack the Sears Tower was announced.

On 15 December 2007 Mohammad Zaki and two cousins Zubair Ahmed, Khaleel Ahmed, received indictments on further terrorism charges of conspiring to kill, kidnap or maim persons outside of the United States, including US military personnel in Iraq and Afghanistan, including taking weapons training, doing bodybuilding exercises and taking steroids, allegedly to prepare for attacks.

A 2011 NPR report claimed some of the people associated with this group were imprisoned in a highly restrictive communication management unit.
