= Lillian BeVier =

American legal scholar

- Born: Lillian Riemer; June 11, 1939 (age 87)
- Title: Distinguished Professor of Law Emeritus

Academic background
- Education: Smith College (BA); Stanford Law School (JD)

Lillian Riemer BeVier (born June 11, 1939) is a professor of law at the University of Virginia School of Law. She was the first woman to become a full professor at the law school, and she holds the position of Distinguished Professor of Law Emeritus.

== Early life and education ==
BeVier earned a bachelor's degree from Smith College in 1961 and a Juris Doctor degree from Stanford Law School in 1965.

== Early career ==
BeVier began her career working on staff at Stanford University, and she also worked as a research associate for a Stanford Law School professor. She later practiced law at a firm in Palo Alto, California and worked as an assistant professor at Santa Clara University School of Law.

== Professorial career ==
BeVier joined the University of Virginia law faculty in 1973. She has taught constitutional law (with special emphasis on First Amendment issues), intellectual property (trademark, copyright), real property, and torts. She was the first woman to become a full professor at the Law School. In May 2010, BeVier retired after 40 years as a law professor, 37 of which were spent at the University of Virginia.

== Failed nomination to the Fourth Circuit ==
On October 22, 1991, President George Herbert Walker Bush nominated BeVier to the U.S. Court of Appeals for the Fourth Circuit. However, her nomination was never processed by the Democrat-controlled U.S. Senate Judiciary Committee, and was returned to Bush at the end of his presidency.

== Possible nomination to the U.S. Supreme Court ==
BeVier was mentioned as a potential replacement for Supreme Court Justice Sandra Day O'Connor. President George W. Bush ultimately selected Samuel Alito.

== See also ==
- George H.W. Bush judicial appointment controversies
