= Joe Oscar Eaton =

American judge (1920–2008)

Joe Eaton
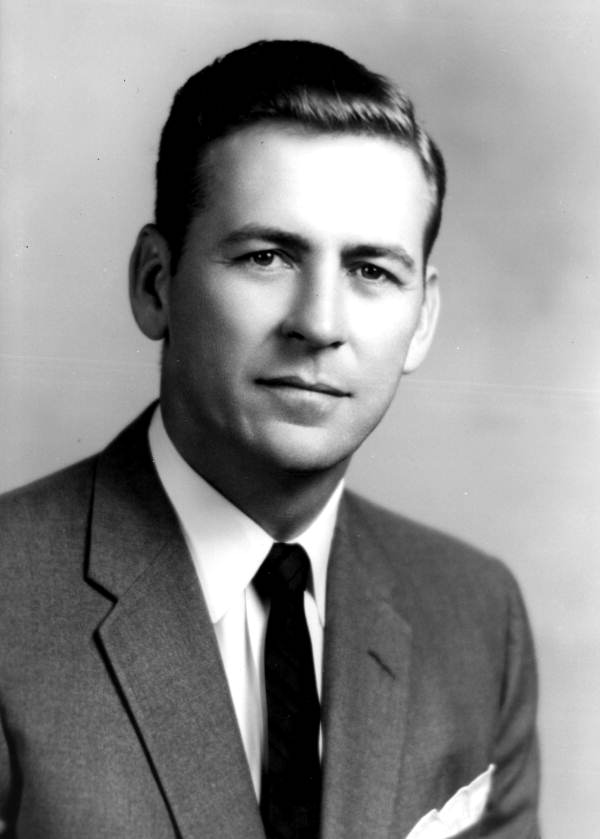
- Eaton in 1957

Senior Judge of the United States District Court for the Southern District of Florida
- In office April 2, 1985 – September 28, 2008

Chief Judge of the United States District Court for the Southern District of Florida
- In office 1982–1984
- Preceded by: C. Clyde Atkins
- Succeeded by: James Lawrence King

Judge of the United States District Court for the Southern District of Florida
- In office June 12, 1967 – April 2, 1985
- Appointed by: Lyndon B. Johnson
- Preceded by: David W. Dyer
- Succeeded by: Kenneth Ryskamp

Personal details
- Born: Joseph Oscar Eaton; April 2, 1920 Monticello, Florida, U.S.
- Died: September 28, 2008 (aged 88) Miami, Florida, U.S.
- Education: Presbyterian College (A.B.); Fredric G. Levin College of Law (LL.B.)

Joseph Oscar Eaton (April 2, 1920 – September 28, 2008) was an American politician and jurist. He was a member of the Florida Senate from 1956 to 1959 and a district judge for the United States District Court for the Southern District of Florida from 1967 to 2008.

== Education and career ==
Born on April 2, 1920, in Monticello, Florida, Eaton received an Artium Baccalaureus degree in 1945 from Presbyterian College and a Bachelor of Laws in 1948 from the Fredric G. Levin College of Law at the University of Florida.

He served as a captain in the United States Army Air Forces from 1941 to 1945. He served as an assistant state attorney in Dade County (now Miami-Dade County), Florida from 1949 to 1951. He served as a major in the United States Air Force from 1951 to 1952. He was a judge of the Eleventh Judicial Circuit Court of Florida serving Dade County from 1953 to 1954 and 1959 to 1967. He was in private practice in Miami, Florida from 1955 to 1959. He was a member of the Florida Senate from 1956 to 1959.

== Federal judicial service ==
Eaton was nominated by President Lyndon B. Johnson on May 24, 1967, to a seat on the United States District Court for the Southern District of Florida vacated by Judge David W. Dyer. He was confirmed by the United States Senate on June 12, 1967, and received his commission on June 12, 1967. He served as Chief Judge from 1982 to 1984. He assumed senior status on April 2, 1985, where he also sat by designation on the 11th Circuit Court of Appeals. His service terminated on September 28, 2008, due to his death in Miami.

== Sources ==
Legal offices
Preceded by David W. Dyer	Judge of the United States District Court for the Southern District of Florida; 1967–1985	Succeeded by Kenneth Ryskamp
Preceded by C. Clyde Atkins	Chief Judge of the United States District Court for the Southern District of Florida; 1982–1984	Succeeded by James Lawrence King
