= Roy Altman =

Venezuelan-American judge (born 1982)

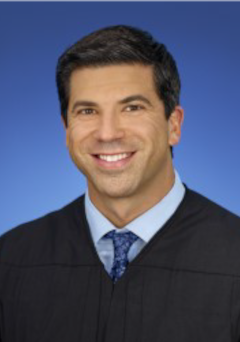

Judge of the United States District Court for the Southern District of Florida
- Incumbent
- Assumed office April 9, 2019
- Appointed by: Donald Trump
- Preceded by: Joan A. Lenard

Personal details
- Born: Roy Kalman Altman; 1982 (age 43–44) Caracas, Venezuela
- Spouse: Rachel N. Silverstein
- Children: 2
- Education: Columbia University (BA); Yale University (JD)
- Profession: Judge; lawyer; writer

Roy Kalman Altman (born 1982) is a Venezuelan-American jurist, lawyer, and author who serves as a United States district judge for the United States District Court for the Southern District of Florida.

Altman graduated from Columbia University in 2004, and Yale Law School in 2007 where he was an editor of the Yale Law Journal. He served as a law clerk to Judge Stanley Marcus of the U.S. Court of Appeals for the Eleventh Circuit, and then as a federal criminal prosecutor from 2008 to 2014. From 2014 to 2019 he was an attorney in private practice. When he was appointed in 2019 at 36 years of age, he became the youngest federal district court judge in the United States.

== Early life and education ==
Altman was born in 1982 in Caracas, Venezuela, and is Jewish.

His paternal grandparents had previously fled Eastern Europe during World War II, finding refuge in Venezuela, while his maternal grandparents migrated from Poland to Mexico.

During the Holocaust, his maternal grandfather's first wife and their five children were killed by the Nazis in the gas chambers in the Auschwitz concentration camp.

His paternal great-grandfather, a police officer in Romania, was exiled by Soviet forces to the Gulag labor camps in Siberia in 1939/40, where he was ultimately killed. His paternal grandfather escaped Prague in 1938 to Venezuela, worked as a hotel general manager in Caracas, and later returned to Europe in 1945 after the war to rescue his sister, who had survived incarceration in the Mogilev concentration camp. His paternal grandmother evaded wartime capture in Europe by hiding, during which time she killed a Nazi soldier; she later was a flight attendant for Air France.

Altman's father grew up in Venezuela, but relocated to Israel at the age of 18 in 1970, where he served as an officer and engineer in the Israeli Air Force. His mother was a nurse who grew up in Mexico and relocated to Israel as a teenager, where she met his father. Following their marriage, his parents returned to Venezuela, where they lived until increasing civil instability prompted them to immigrate to and settle in Miami, Florida, in 1984, when Altman was two years old.

=== Education ===
Altman attended high school at Miami Country Day School, graduating in 2000. There, he competed as a four-year member of both the varsity football team, and of the varsity baseball team as a pitcher and outfielder, and played varsity basketball at guard for two seasons. In football, Altman played quarterback and was named to the Miami Herald First Team All-Dade squad twice, and was named the Miami Herald's Class 3A-1A Football Player of the Year during his senior season. In baseball, he was named First Team All-Conference honors during his senior season. For his academic and athletic performance, he was named a finalist for the Miami Herald Scholar Athlete of the Year in 2000.

He attended Columbia College of Columbia University, where he studied the Core Curriculum and graduated with a Bachelor of Arts with honors in 2004. While at Columbia, Altman was a dual student-athlete, playing as a quarterback on the Columbia Lions football team and as a pitcher on the Columbia Lions baseball team, earning All-Ivy honors in baseball. In his senior season in 2004, pitching for the baseball team in 19 games he had four saves, tied for fifth-most in a season in school history.

Altman earned his Juris Doctor in 2007 from Yale Law School. There, he was Projects Editor of volume 116 of the Yale Law Journal.

== Early legal career ==
=== Law clerk ===
He began his legal career as a law clerk to Judge Stanley Marcus of the United States Court of Appeals for the Eleventh Circuit from 2007 to 2008.

=== Federal prosecutor ===
Altman served for six years as an assistant United States attorney for the Southern District of Florida, from 2008 to 2014. He prosecuted hundreds of criminal cases and tried more than 20 cases to jury verdict, arguing several of them before the United States Court of Appeals for the Eleventh Circuit, advancing to Deputy Chief of Special Prosecutions.

He was designated the Federal Prosecutor of the Year in 2012 by the Miami-Dade County Association of Chiefs of Police and the Law Enforcement Officers Charitable Foundation, and received the Federal Bar Association 2013 Young Federal Lawyer Award, the Director of the Executive Office of U.S. Attorneys Award for Superior Litigation Team in United States v. Mentor in 2014, and the Director of the Executive Office of U.S. Attorneys Award for Superior Litigation Performance in United States v. Flanders in 2015.

=== Private practice ===
In 2014, Altman joined the trial and appellate law firm of Podhurst Orseck in Miami, Florida, as a partner, a position that he held until 2019. He specialized in commercial litigation, mass torts, and international aviation law. He represented families affected by the disappearance of Malaysia Airlines Flight 370, handled cross-border fraud and tobacco product liability cases, and served on the Florida Third District Court of Appeal Judicial Nominating Commission.

== Federal judicial service ==
=== Confirmation; youngest U.S. federal district court judge ===
Altman was mentioned as a potential judicial nominee in February 2018, when he emerged as a leading candidate recommended by Florida's bipartisan judicial nominating commission. On April 26, 2018, President Donald Trump announced his intent to nominate Altman to serve as a United States District Judge of the United States District Court for the Southern District of Florida. On May 7, 2018, his nomination was sent to the U.S. Senate. He was nominated to fill the seat vacated by Judge Joan A. Lenard, who assumed senior status on July 1, 2017. On June 20, 2018, a confirmation hearing on his nomination was held by the Senate Judiciary Committee. On July 19, 2018, his nomination was reported out of committee by a 17–4 vote.

However, the full Senate did not act on his nomination before the conclusion of the Congressional term, and on January 3, 2019, his nomination was returned to the President under Rule XXXI, Paragraph 6 of the Senate. On January 23, 2019, President Trump announced his intent to renominate Altman for a federal judgeship. His nomination was sent to the Senate later that day. On February 7, 2019, his nomination was reported out of committee without a new hearing by a 16–6 vote. On April 3, 2019, the Senate invoked cloture on his nomination by a 66–33 vote. The following day, on April 4, 2019, Altman was confirmed by a 66–33 vote.

He received his lifetime judicial commission on April 9, 2019. At 36 years of age, he was the youngest federal district court judge in the United States, and the youngest-ever appointed judge in the Southern District of Florida.

=== Notable cases ===
Altman has presided over civil actions involving complex corporate, constitutional, and political matters.

- Donald J. Trump v. British Broadcasting Corporation: Altman is the presiding trial judge in a $10 billion defamation lawsuit filed by Donald Trump against the British Broadcasting Corporation (BBC). The suit stems from the broadcaster's editing of Trump's January 6, 2021 speech in a 2024 Panorama documentary, which Trump alleges created a false impression that he incited violence. Altman drew legal media attention for admonishing Trump's counsel over missed procedural filing deadlines.
- Trump Organization v. Capital One: Altman presided over a major commercial lawsuit in which the Trump Organization accused the bank of politically motivated "de-banking" by abruptly closing hundreds of the Trump Organization's corporate accounts after the conclusion of Trump's first presidential term. Altman originally dismissed the case due to a lack of initial sufficient evidence, but granted the plaintiffs leave to refile, overseeing subsequent heavily redacted amended complaints and court-ordered evidence exchanges.
- Generative AI misuse admonitions: Altman has issued formal warnings to litigating counsel appearing in his court concerning the unchecked use of artificial intelligence in drafted filings, noting that failing to personally verify AI-generated case citations stunts attorney development and causes severe professional harm to clients.

=== International judicial fact-finding missions ===
In March 2024, Altman, U.S. District Judge Lee Rudofsky, and litigator Matthew Solomon organized a one-week fact-finding mission to Israel of 14 U.S. federal judges to examine legal issues. The mission examined the impact of the October 7 attacks on the Israeli legal system, specifically international humanitarian law and the law of armed conflict from the Israeli perspective. During the visit, the delegation conducted high-level legal consultations with Israeli Foreign Ministry legal advisor Tal Becker, military justice representatives of the IDF, and Palestinian human rights activists. Since then, Altman has brought three judicial education missions of U.S. federal judges to Israel, to study cross-border evidentiary and humanitarian legal dynamics, sponsored by the World Jewish Congress.

=== University of Miami School of Law commencement address ===
On May 14, 2026, Altman delivered the keynote commencement address to the graduating class at the University of Miami School of Law's spring graduation ceremony. In his address, he detailed his experiences on the federal bench, emphasized the ethical obligations of young lawyers entering highly polarized civic environments, and discussed how adhering to foundational legal methodology helps safeguard factual truth in modern public discourse.

== Works ==
In 2026, Altman published his debut book, Israel on Trial: Examining the History, the Evidence, and the Law, a 304-page historical and legal text addressing legal and historical debates surrounding Israel, antisemitism, and the Israeli–Palestinian conflict after the October 7 attacks. The book achieved national commercial success, placing on both The New York Times Best Seller List and the USA Today bestseller list.

== Memberships ==
Altman was a member of the Federalist Society from 2004 during his studies at Yale Law School to 2007. He rejoined the organization in 2015 while working in private practice.

Since rejoining, Altman frequently speaks at events hosted by the Federalist Society to various audiences, including law school students. His presentations span a wide variety of constitutional and professional topics, including modern originalism, free speech legal frameworks, and Western civilizational protections of open discourse. He has partnered with the society's metropolitan networks to host interactive book forums exploring how rigorous evidentiary principles apply to highly polarized global issues.

== Personal life ==
Altman is married to Rachel N. Silverstein, Ph.D., who serves as the executive director of the environmental non-profit organization Miami Waterkeeper. The couple resides in Miami, and has two children.

== See also ==
- List of Hispanic and Latino American jurists
- List of Jewish American jurists

== Bibliography ==
=== Books ===
- Altman, Roy K. (2026). Israel on Trial: Examining the History, the Evidence, and the Law. Simon & Schuster. p. 304. ISBN 978-1636987156.

=== Articles and essays ===
- Altman, Roy K. (October 24, 2021). "The Eleventh Circuit's Modern Originalism". Federalist Society Review. 22: 45–58.
- Altman, Roy K. (June 12, 2026). "Preserving Truth in a Polarized Courtroom". University of Miami Law Review. 80 (4): 912–924.

Legal offices
Preceded by Joan A. Lenard	Judge of the United States District Court for the Southern District of Florida; 2019–present	Incumbent
