= David S. Leibowitz =

American judge (born 1971)

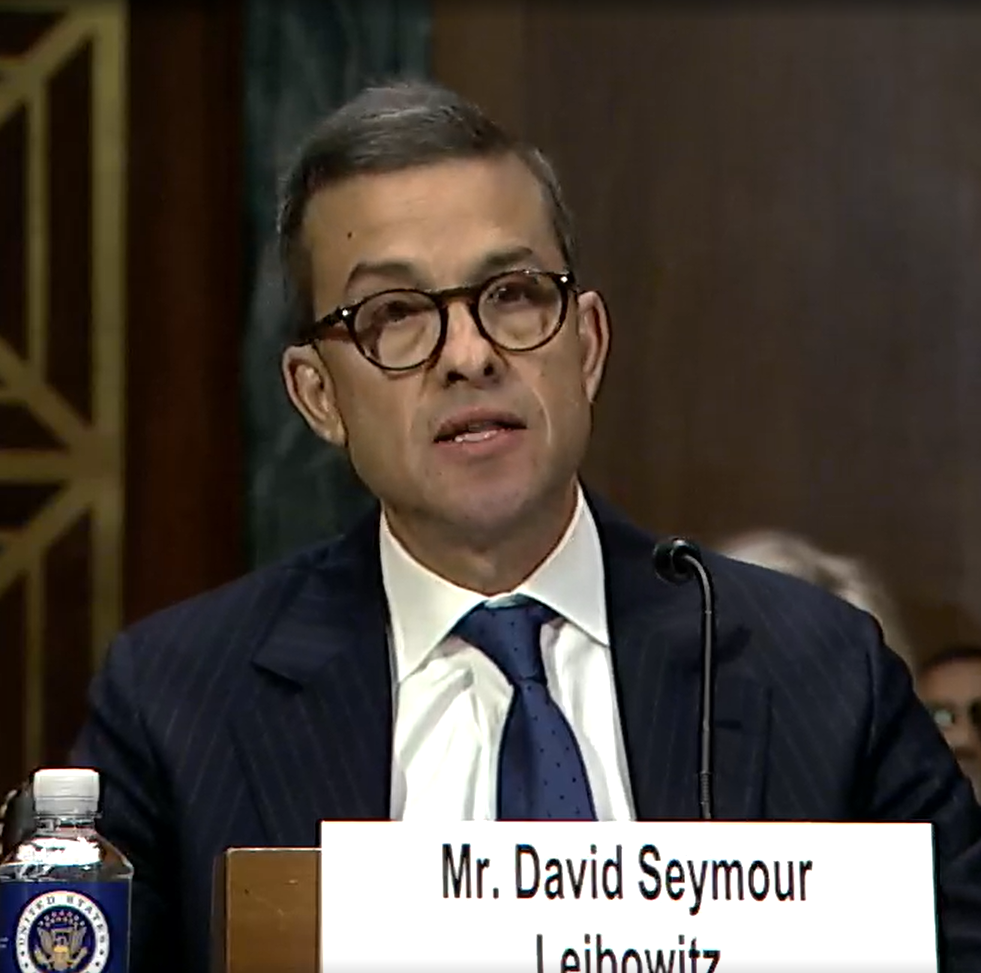

Judge of the United States District Court for the Southern District of Florida
- Incumbent
- Assumed office March 1, 2024
- Appointed by: Joe Biden
- Preceded by: Federico A. Moreno

Personal details
- Born: David Seymour Leibowitz; 1971 (age 54–55) Miami, Florida, U.S.
- Education: University of Pennsylvania (BA, JD); London School of Economics (PhD)

David Seymour Leibowitz (born 1971) is an American lawyer from Florida who is serving as a United States district judge of the United States District Court for the Southern District of Florida.

== Education ==
Leibowitz received a Bachelor of Arts from the University of Pennsylvania in 1993, a Doctor of Philosophy from the London School of Economics in 1998 and a Juris Doctor from the University of Pennsylvania Law School in 2000.

== Career ==
Leibowitz served as a law clerk for Associate Justice Robert Flanders of the Rhode Island Supreme Court from 2000 to 2001. From 2001 to 2003, he served as an assistant district attorney in the Office of the District Attorney for Middlesex County in Cambridge, Massachusetts. From 2003 to 2012, he served as an assistant United States attorney in the U.S. Attorney's Office for the Southern District of New York. He served as corporate counsel for Braman Management Association in Miami from 2012 to 2024, and secretary and general counsel from 2015 to 2023 and as assistant secretary and assistant general counsel from 2023 to 2024.

=== Federal judicial service ===
In 2021, U.S. Senator Marco Rubio recommended Leibowitz to the Biden administration to be a federal judge. On November 1, 2023, President Joe Biden announced his intent to nominate Leibowitz to serve as a United States district judge of the United States District Court for the Southern District of Florida. He was nominated as part of a bipartisan package of nominees which included Jacqueline Becerra and Melissa Damian. On November 6, 2023, his nomination was sent to the Senate. President Biden nominated Leibowitz to the seat vacated by Judge Federico A. Moreno, who assumed senior status on July 17, 2020. On November 29, 2023, a hearing on his nomination was held before the Senate Judiciary Committee. On January 3, 2024, his nomination was returned to the president under Rule XXXI, Paragraph 6 of the United States Senate and he was renominated on January 8, 2024. On January 18, 2024, his nomination was reported out of committee by a 16–5 vote. On February 27, 2024, the Senate invoked cloture on his nomination by a 64–33 vote. Later that day, his nomination was confirmed by a 64–33 vote. He received his judicial commission on March 1, 2024.

== Personal life ==
Leibowitz is the nephew of Norman Braman, a billionaire with a car dealership empire throughout South Florida. Braman is one of senator Rubio's most prominent benefactors, including donating between $5 million and $10 million to Marco Rubio 2016 presidential campaign.

Legal offices
Preceded by Federico A. Moreno	Judge of the United States District Court for the Southern District of Florida; 2024–present	Incumbent
