= SunCruz Aquasino =

Gambling cruise ship

- Company type: Private (Owned by Aquasino Partners of South Carolina, LLC)
- Industry: Transportation
- Founded: 2010; 16 years ago
- Defunct: 2014
- Headquarters: Little River, South Carolina
- Area served: Horry County, South Carolina
- Products: Cruises, Gambling
- Website: http://www.suncruzcasino.com

The SunCruz Aquasino was a 220-foot-long (67 m), 600-passenger, 5-hour gambling cruise ship based in Little River, South Carolina. The SunCruz Aquasino offered "Cruises to Nowhere," legally transporting passengers into international waters beyond federal and state gambling laws. SunCruz Aquasino offered classic table games such as blackjack, baccarat, and craps, as well as a live poker room and slot machines. Operations for the gambling ship abruptly ceased in July 2014.

== History ==
SunCruz was founded by multimillionaire Konstantinos "Gus" Boulis, who also founded the Miami Subs sandwich shop franchise. Boulis purchased eleven luxury yachts, which he remodeled into casinos. These would conduct "Cruises to Nowhere", consisting of a three-mile (4.8 km) cruise from the Florida coast into what was then considered international waters. While in international waters, passengers could gamble on poker, blackjack and slot machines. Boulis named the fleet the SunCruz Casino line. By the time of its sale in 2000, SunCruz was earning tens of millions of dollars of profits annually, and had over 2,000 employees.

In September 2007, SunCruz discontinued operations at Palm Beach, and service has subsequently been discontinued at Daytona and Treasure Island as well. On December 16, 2009, SunCruz Casinos was reported to be closing amid allegations that it owed $300,000 to the Canaveral Port Authority. Less than two weeks later, on December 28, parent company Ocean Casino Cruises filed Chapter 7 bankruptcy. At the time of the filing, there were approximately 300 full and part-time employees. In May 2010, SunCruz returned to Little River, South Carolina under a new name, SantaCruz Casino, and under new ownership by Casino Partners of South Carolina, LLC.

== Lawsuit by Horry County ==
In 2011, Horry County sued the operator of SunCruz Aquasino for breach of contract, alleging that SunCruz had failed to make payments to Horry County for passenger fees received during the months of August and September 2011. Horry County was supposed to receive a fee of $7 per passenger instead of collecting taxes based on the boat's revenue. The suit asked for $165,000 in back payments plus legal costs. Aquasino asserted they had stopped making payments due to the county not enforcing a ban on illegal gambling, which was also part of the agreement. The company's position was that it had protested the boarding fees from the beginning of their relationship with the county, stating they were onerous. Even so, they had continued to pay those fees in good faith. However, when the county did not seem to be doing enough regarding the illegal gambling, they suspended payments, entering into negotiations with the county to reach a compromise. It was during these negotiations when the county filed its lawsuit.

On July 23, 2012, Horry County Circuit Judge Benjamin Culbertson ordered SunCruz Casino to start paying the passenger boarding fees as stipulated in the agreement, but did not issue a ruling on any alleged past due amounts. On July 29, the county received a check for $20,202.

== Cruz/Gambling Features and Options ==
SunCruz Aquasino offered players Vegas-style slots ranging from $0.02 to $25.00, including ticket-in and ticket-out machines. Blackjack, Poker, Texas Hold ’Em, Rummy, Roulette, Craps, and sports-book wagering were also offered.

== See also ==
- SunCruz Casinos, a former casino boat company that went bankrupt in 2009.
