= James Lawrence King =

American judge (1927–2026)

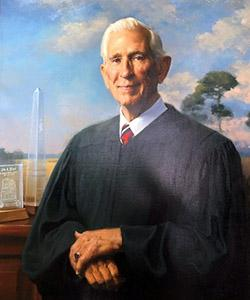

Senior Judge of the United States District Court for the Southern District of Florida
- In office December 20, 1992 – May 2, 2026

Chief Judge of the United States District Court for the Southern District of Florida
- In office 1984–1991
- Preceded by: Joe Oscar Eaton
- Succeeded by: Norman Charles Roettger Jr.

Judge of the United States District Court for the Southern District of Florida
- In office October 19, 1970 – December 20, 1992
- Appointed by: Richard Nixon
- Preceded by: Seat established
- Succeeded by: Joan A. Lenard

Personal details
- Born: December 20, 1927 Miami, Florida, U.S.
- Died: May 2, 2026 (aged 98) Pinecrest, Florida, U.S.
- Education: University of Florida (BEd, LLB)

James Lawrence King (December 20, 1927 – May 2, 2026) was a United States district judge of the United States District Court for the Southern District of Florida, and one of the longest serving federal judges in the United States.

== Early life and career ==
King was born in Miami, Florida, on December 20, 1927. He graduated from Redland High School in 1945. He received his Bachelor of Education from the University of Florida in 1949 and a Bachelor of Laws from the Fredric G. Levin College of Law at the same institution in 1953. There, he was a member of the Florida Law Review and Phi Kappa Tau fraternity.

He served in the United States Air Force from 1953 to 1955 in the Judge Advocate General's Department as a first lieutenant. He was in a private law practice in Miami from 1953 until 1964 when he became a member of the Florida Board of Regents. From 1964 until 1970, he was a circuit judge of the Eleventh Judicial Circuit Court of Florida. During his service as a circuit judge, King sat by designation with the Florida Supreme Court in 1965 and with the Florida Third District Court of Appeal from 1966 to 1967.

=== Federal judicial service ===
On October 7, 1970, King was nominated by President Richard Nixon to a new seat on the United States District Court for the Southern District of Florida established by 84 Stat. 294. King was confirmed by the United States Senate on October 13, 1970, and received his commission on October 19, 1970. He served as Chief Judge from 1984 to 1991, assuming senior status on December 20, 1992.

=== Notable rulings ===
In 1981, King overruled the State of Florida in determining that treasure hunter Mel Fisher was the rightful owner of treasure salvaged from the wreck of a Spanish galleon of the 1715 Treasure Fleet, in the Cobb Coin case. In 1999 he ruled that relatives of the Brothers to the Rescue pilots shot down by the Cuban Air Force could sue Cuba for wrongful death. He also dismissed challenges to Florida's felony disenfranchisement law and Florida's prohibition against homosexual adoption. King was ultimately affirmed by the Eleventh Circuit in both cases.

In 1989, King dismissed the filing of the Christic Institute in Avirgan v. Hull (932 F.2d 1572), the main civil litigation concerning the Iran–Contra affair.

== Later life ==
On April 30, 1996, the United States Congress renamed the Federal Justice Building at 99 N.E. 4th Street in Miami the James Lawrence King Federal Justice Building. King died at his home in Pinecrest, Florida, on May 2, 2026, at the age of 98.

== See also ==
- List of United States federal judges by longevity of service

== Sources ==
Legal offices
Preceded by Seat established by 84 Stat. 294	Judge of the United States District Court for the Southern District of Florida; 1970–1992	Succeeded by Joan A. Lenard
Preceded by Joe Oscar Eaton	Chief Judge of the United States District Court for the Southern District of Florida; 1984–1991	Succeeded by Norman Charles Roettger Jr.
