= James A. McIntyre =

American lawyer (1938–2020)

James A. McIntyre (September 13, 1938 – August 16, 2020) was an Associate Justice of the California Fourth District Court of Appeal, Division One, having been appointed to the post by Governor Pete Wilson in 1996. In the 1998 general election, 73.3% of California voters decided to re-elect McIntyre for the remainder of the unexpired term, which was not scheduled to end until January 6, 2003. In the 2002 general election, 73.5% of the voters decided to re-elect McIntyre to a term expiring on January 5, 2015.

== Early life ==
Born in Chicago, Illinois, McIntyre earned his A.B. in philosophy from Brown University in 1960. After earning his LL.B. from Stanford Law School in 1963, he gained admission to the California State Bar, various United States district courts in California, and the U.S. Ninth Circuit Court of Appeals.

== Career ==
From 1963–1993, McIntyre was a civil trial attorney with the law firm of McInnis, Fitzgerald, Rees, Sharkey & McIntyre, where he tried over 100 civil jury trials. During his time with the firm, his clients included medical professionals and institutions in medical malpractice cases and clients in cases involving insurance, liability, legal malpractice, accounting malpractice, construction, real estate, and fraud.

While in private practice, McIntyre was an adjunct professor of law at the University of San Diego School of Law. He was also listed in "The Best Lawyers in America" and "Who's Who Among Practicing Attorneys."

Governor Pete Wilson appointed McIntyre to the San Diego County Superior Court in 1993. Three years later, Wilson elevated McIntyre to the Fourth District Court of Appeal, Division One in June 1996.

Since becoming a justice of the Court of Appeal in 1996, McIntyre had been appointed to serve on various judicial committees. In 1997, he was appointed to the Judicial Council of California's Court Profiles Advisory Committee, which makes recommendations on new judgeships, where he served until 1999. At that time, he was appointed to the Judicial Council Task Force on Jury Instructions, where he served until 2001. After his time on the task force, he was appointed to an appellate panel of justices who are responsible for hearing writ petitions in labor disputes between Superior Courts and their employees, where he still serves.

He was a Master of the Enright Chapter of the American Inns of Court, a Fellow of the American College of Trial Lawyers, a Diplomate of the American Board of Trial Advocates and had an "AV" rating in Martindale-Hubbell (the highest rating possible).

== Personal life and death ==
McIntyre and his wife Victoria Bradley McIntyre had two daughters, Jill McIntyre Kelly and Jamie McIntyre Brown. He had two children from his first marriage, Scott and Molly McIntyre. Outside of his professional activities, McIntyre had also been a board member for various community and education groups, a little league manager, and a soccer coach.

McIntyre died on August 16, 2020, due to kidney failure as a complication of pancreatic cancer, at the age of 81.

Legal offices
Preceded by Charles W. Froehlich	Associate Justice of the California Court of Appeal for the Fourth District; Division One; June 6, 1996–present	Incumbent
