= Gus Boulis =

Greek businessman (1949–2001)

- Κωνσταντίνος Μπούλης
- Born: Konstantinos Boulis; April 6, 1949; Kavala, Greece
- Died: February 6, 2001; Fort Lauderdale, Florida
- Cause of death: Murder
- Other name: Gus
- Occupation: Businessman
- Known for: Founding Miami Subs and SunCruz Casinos
- Spouse: Efrosini "Frances" Boulis (m. 1971–1998)
- Partner: Margaret Hren (1980–1998)
- Children: 2

Konstantinos "Gus" Boulis (Greek: Κωνσταντίνος Μπούλης; April 6, 1949 – February 6, 2001) was an entrepreneur, land developer, casino operator, and restaurateur of Greek descent, who was murdered in 2001. The murder has been alleged to be in connection with the sale of his company, SunCruz Casinos.

== Early life ==
Boulis was born in Kavala, a city in northern Greece, and was the third of four children. During his childhood, he was known as "Kostas". Each day after school he would run to the shore to wait for his father's fishing boat. Boulis found it difficult to deal with the death of his brother, Panagiotis "Peter" Boulis, who was fatally electrocuted in a freak accident, and he wanted to leave his home country for a future in the United States. At 16, he took classes in ship mechanics to prepare himself with necessary skills.

In 1968, Boulis absconded from a ship in Halifax, Nova Scotia, Canada and began working as a dishwasher at a Mr. Submarine shop in Toronto. He later became a shareholder in the company. In July 1971, while at a dry-cleaning store, Boulis met 16-year-old receptionist, Efrosini "Frances", who also originated from Kavala. On the day they met, Boulis was detained as an illegal migrant. A week later they were married, automatically granting Boulis Canadian citizenship. After four years of marriage they had two sons, Christos and Panagiotis. The couple split in 1976, and Frances returned to Greece.

== Early career ==
Frances stayed in Greece raising their two sons while Boulis developed his multiple businesses and holding companies in North America. After opening almost 200 Mr. Submarine shops, Boulis sold his shares in the company and relocated to Key West, Florida. Within days of arriving in Florida, Boulis had met Margaret Hren, an 18-year-old from Minnesota. After obtaining a $50,000 loan from a Canadian bank, Hren agreed to assist Boulis in launching a restaurant business after the couple had renovated a dilapidated restaurant in Key West. Two years later, Boulis constructed his first hotel, the "Marriott Key Largo Beach Resort" obtaining the startup funds with a $2.5 million overdraft from a local bank. Eventually Boulis and Hren had two sons. Frances remained in Greece and filed for a divorce and half of his assets.

== Later career ==
In 1979, Boulis moved to Florida with the intent to retire, however he soon began building the popular Miami Subs Grill. He continued his success in food business, expanding the Miami Subs chain throughout Florida and beyond. In May 1994, Boulis bought a legendary mafia restaurant in Hollywood Florida, the Joe Sonken's Gold Coast Restaurant and Lounge, and flipped it into a Miami Subs Grill. He sold the Miami Subs Grill chain to Nathan's Famous hot dog chain in 1999 for $4.2 million.

In 1994, Gus Boulis took 300 of his Miami Subs Grill employees aboard a Las Vegas-style gambling ship for a party. This experience inspired him to purchase the "Sir Winston" for $2 million only a few days later, a 100-foot cruise ship which he rapidly converted into a casino ship. It was this that based the grounds for his new venture, which would ultimately result in his death.

Boulis founded the SunCruz Casinos boat company in 1994 in Key Largo. It was a cruise line with "cruises to nowhere" as the passengers would gamble on the voyage as the ships would travel out onto international water, where Florida gambling laws were not applicable. Boulis' largest and most profitable gambling boat was docked on the Intracoastal Waterway in Hollywood, Florida, where he had the support of mayor Mara Giulianti. However, Hollywood community beach activists, led by City Commissioner John F. Coleman, strongly opposed the gambling boat operation. The sheriff of the area, Ken Jenne, worked repeatedly with attorney general Bob Butterworth to end operations of the company as they strongly opposed it. On one instance in 1998, the pair shut down three SunCruz boats, and showed up to the SunCruz V with police forces and seized over 300 gambling machines, ship equipment and nearly $630,000 in cash, after undercover officers completed a nine-month investigation to catch SunCruz practising gambling within the three-mile limit. This was fought in court, to which SunCruz won the case because there was no probable cause for the State Attorney General's Office to seize the equipment and money. Mayor Mara Giulianti lobbied to have Boulis finance and build the "Diamond on the Beach" beach hotel, a deal that ultimately fell through. His business drew opposition from other Florida government officials regarding questions on when Boulis attained his American citizenship. The government alleged he purchased some of his SunCruz gambling boats before he became a US citizen. In February 2000, Boulis settled with Federal authorities by agreeing to sell his interest in the SunCruz business within three years and pay a $500,000 fine. According to the Broward Palm Beach New Times, Gus Boulis had also registered his casino boats under his former girlfriend's name, Margaret Hren, to hide his ownership.

In September 2000, Boulis had agreed to sell SunCruz to Jack Abramoff and Adam Kidan for $147.5 million. In the deal Boulis kept a silent ten percent interest, accepting a $20 million promissory note in lieu of the $23 million cash down payment. This transaction later went on to be the focus of a grand jury inquiry.

== Murder and subsequent investigation ==
On August 11, 2005, Abramoff and Kidan were indicted by a federal grand jury in Fort Lauderdale, Florida, on fraud charges relating to the disputed $23 million bank transfer used as down payment for the purchase of SunCruz Casinos. Kidan pleaded guilty on December 15, 2005, Abramoff pleaded guilty on January 3, 2006.

Three men were charged with the 2001 murder of Boulis:

- Anthony "Little Tony" Ferrari was arrested at his North Miami Beach home on September 25, 2005.
- James "Pudgy" Fiorillo, was arrested on September 26, 2005, in Palm Coast.
- Anthony "Big Tony" Moscatiello was arrested at his Howard Beach home in New York on September 26, 2005.

Moscatiello and Ferrari were charged with first-degree murder, conspiracy to commit murder, and solicitation to commit murder. Fiorillo was charged with first-degree murder and conspiracy to commit murder.

It was alleged that Kidan hired Anthony Moscatiello as a business advisor (despite a previous indictment as former bookkeeper for the Gambino crime family), paying him $145,000 through SunCruz for services that were allegedly never rendered. Ferrari also received $95,000 from SunCruz as payment for security services, in addition to further sums in casino chips.

In May 2006, Kidan told authorities that Moscatiello and Ferrari confided in him that another Gotti associate, John Gurino, killed Boulis. Gurino himself was killed in October 2003 by a deli owner in a separate incident. At the time, Gurino was not a part of the Boulis investigation.

Ferrari, Fiorillo, and Moscatiello were held at the Broward County Jail. After numerous trial delays, Fiorillo pleaded guilty to conspiracy in 2012, and Ferrari was convicted of first-degree murder and sentenced to life in prison without the possibility of parole. On July 1, 2015, Moscatiello was convicted of first-degree murder and conspiracy to commit murder. He was sentenced to life in prison following the sentencing recommendation of the jury that convicted him.
