= Kenneth Ryskamp =

American judge

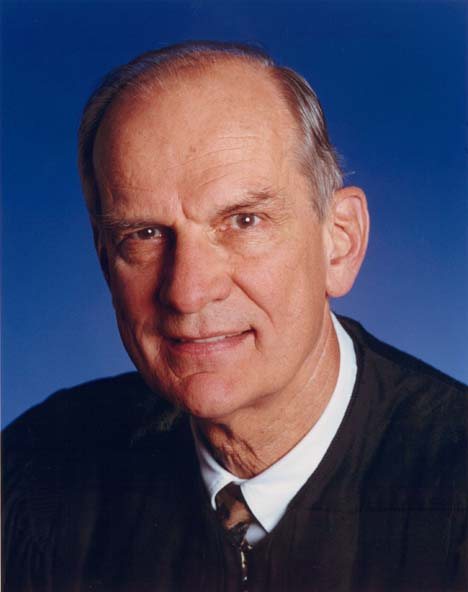

Senior Judge of the United States District Court for the Southern District of Florida
- In office January 1, 2000 – November 16, 2017

Judge of the United States District Court for the Southern District of Florida
- In office April 24, 1986 – January 1, 2000
- Appointed by: Ronald Reagan
- Preceded by: Joe Oscar Eaton
- Succeeded by: Paul Huck

Personal details
- Born: Kenneth Lee Ryskamp; August 10, 1932 Grand Rapids, Michigan
- Died: November 16, 2017 (aged 85)
- Education: Calvin College (A.B.); University of Miami School of Law (J.D.)

Kenneth Lee Ryskamp (August 10, 1932 – November 16, 2017) was a United States district judge of the United States District Court for the Southern District of Florida.

== Education and career ==
Born in Grand Rapids, Michigan, Ryskamp received an Artium Baccalaureus degree from Calvin College in 1955. He received a Juris Doctor from University of Miami School of Law in 1956. He was a law clerk for Judge Mallory H. Horton of the Florida Third District Court of Appeal from 1957 to 1959. He was in private practice of law in Miami, Florida from 1959 to 1986.

== Federal judicial service ==
Ryskamp was nominated by President Ronald Reagan on March 12, 1986, to a seat on the United States District Court for the Southern District of Florida vacated by Judge Joe Oscar Eaton. He was confirmed by the United States Senate on April 23, 1986, and received commission on April 24, 1986. He took the judicial oath and commenced service on May 2, 1986. He assumed senior status on January 1, 2000. As of January 2017, Ryskamp took inactive senior status, meaning that while he remained a federal judge, he no longer heard cases or participated in the business of the court. Ryskamp died on November 16, 2017.

== Failed nomination to the Eleventh Circuit ==
On April 26, 1990, Ryskamp was nominated to a seat on the United States Court of Appeals for the Eleventh Circuit by President George H. W. Bush to replace Judge Paul Hitch Roney, who had taken senior status. The Democratic-controlled United States Senate Judiciary Committee chose not to proceed with Ryskamp's nomination, in part because of his membership in a private country club, the Riviera Country Club in Coral Gables, Florida, that was said to be discriminatory. Some senators also objected to comments by Ryskamp during a 1987 case that they considered to be insensitive. After the November 1990 elections, Bush renominated Ryskamp to the seat on January 8, 1991, but Ryskamp's nomination continued to be held up in committee by Senate Democrats, and it eventually was defeated in the Senate Judiciary Committee by an 8–6, party-line vote on April 12, 1991. As a result, his nomination never made it to the Senate floor for a full Senate vote.

== See also ==
- George H. W. Bush judicial appointment controversies

== Sources ==
Legal offices
Preceded by Joe Oscar Eaton	Judge of the United States District Court for the Southern District of Florida; 1986–2000	Succeeded by Paul Huck
