= Adam Kidan =

American businessman

- Born: Adam Ronald Kidan; July 30, 1964 (age 62); Brooklyn, New York, U.S.
- Education: George Washington University; Brooklyn Law School (JD)
- Occupations: Business executive, lawyer
- Known for: SunCruz Casinos fraud case Jack Abramoff scandal
- Criminal charge(s): Conspiracy, wire fraud
- Criminal penalty: 70 months' imprisonment, US$21.7 million restitution
- Criminal status: Pardoned (2026)
- Spouse(s): Tracy Schneider (div. 2023); Cristiani De Fatima Pereira (m. 2023)

Adam Ronald Kidan (born 30 July 1964) is an American business executive, Republican political donor, and former lawyer who serves as president of the staffing company Empire Workforce Solutions.

He is known for his involvement with Jack Abramoff in the 2000 acquisition of SunCruz Casinos, which resulted in federal fraud convictions and became part of the wider Abramoff scandal. Kidan pleaded guilty to conspiracy and wire fraud in 2005 and was sentenced to 70 months in federal prison in 2006, which he served for 31 months before being released in 2009.

After his release, Kidan co-founded Chartwell Staffing Solutions and later Empire Workforce Solutions, and became a major Republican political donor in Pennsylvania. On 3 July 2026, U.S. president Donald Trump granted him a full federal pardon.

== Early life and education ==
Kidan grew up in Brooklyn, New York, in a Jewish family. He attended John Dewey High School, where he served as president of the Social Science Club and editor-in-chief of the school newspaper, The Gadfly. In 1998, Kidan returned to John Dewey High School as its graduation keynote speaker.

He attended George Washington University as an undergraduate and earned a Juris Doctor from Brooklyn Law School in 1989, where he was awarded the American Jurisprudence Award in legal writing and research. During this period he was active in the national office of the College Republicans.

== Career ==
=== Early business ventures and law practice ===
After law school, Kidan served as president of the Four Freedoms Foundation, where he organized economic-development programs for Eastern Europe. Kidan was admitted to the New York bar in 1989 and joined a New York City law firm, later a partner in Duncan, Fish, Bergson and Kidan. While practising law, Kidan invested in two bagel stores in the Hamptons. He later sold his interest in the business. Kidan also worked as legal counsel to Dial-A-Mattress. After leaving the company, he began operating its Washington-area franchise through Atlantic & Pacific Mattress Co. Beginning in 1992, he served as chairman and chief executive officer of Atlantic & Pacific and oversaw the expansion of the regional business.

In 1992, Kidan bought the Washington-area Dial-A-Mattress franchise through Atlantic & Pacific Mattress Co., where he later served as chairman and chief executive officer. He wrote and appeared in local television advertisements for the franchise using the company’s “leave the last ‘S’ off for savings” advertising slogan, becoming a recognizable figure in the Washington business community as the business expanded into retail showrooms. Kidan declared personal bankruptcy in 1995. Atlantic & Pacific filed for Chapter 11 bankruptcy protection in April 1996 during a legal dispute with Dial-A-Mattress. The dispute was later resolved. Kidan sold the franchise back to Dial-A-Mattress in July 1999, and an associated online venture, eMattress.com, collapsed the same year.

In 1998, he was elected chairman of the D.C. Chamber of Commerce Political Action Committee. He also served on the boards of Greater DC Cares and the Greater Washington Urban League and was a co-chair of Anthony Williams’s mayoral transition committee. He also served on the board of the Laurel Regional Hospital Foundation and Washington Hebrew Congregation and on the Women’s Issues Leadership Committee of Washington Hospital Center. In April 1998, George Washington University invited Kidan to address business students as part of its Hoffman Lecture Series for entrepreneurs.

Kidan was disbarred by the New York Supreme Court's Appellate Division in November 2000 in connection with an ethics matter, and was subsequently reciprocally disbarred in New Jersey.

=== SunCruz Casinos and criminal case ===
In September 2000, Kidan and Washington lobbyist Jack Abramoff acquired the SunCruz Casinos fleet of offshore gambling boats from Greek-American businessman Konstantinos "Gus" Boulis for a nominal purchase price of US$147.5 million. Federal prosecutors later alleged that the two men had submitted a counterfeit wire transfer document to lenders to make it appear that they had made a US$23 million equity contribution to the deal, thereby inducing two lenders to provide approximately US$60 million in financing.

Following the sale, Kidan and Boulis fell into a bitter dispute over the operation of SunCruz. Boulis was shot to death in a mob-style attack while driving in Fort Lauderdale on 6 February 2001. Two of the three men later charged with the murder had been hired as consultants by Kidan.

In August 2005, a federal grand jury in Fort Lauderdale indicted Kidan and Abramoff on one count of conspiracy and five counts of wire fraud in connection with the SunCruz purchase. On 15 December 2005, Kidan pleaded guilty in Miami federal court to conspiracy and wire fraud as part of a plea bargain in which four additional felony counts were dropped; he also agreed to cooperate with prosecutors in the ongoing investigation of Abramoff. In March 2006, Kidan and Abramoff were each sentenced to 70 months in federal prison and jointly ordered to pay approximately US$21.7 million in restitution to the defrauded lenders.

Kidan was released from federal custody in 2009 after serving 31 months.

In 2013, he testified for the prosecution at Ferrari's Broward County murder trial, stating that Ferrari and Moscatiello had confessed to him that they had orchestrated Boulis's killing and had threatened his life if he ever disclosed it.

=== Staffing companies ===
After his release, Kidan entered the staffing industry. In 2011, he cofounded Chartwell Staffing Services, Inc. (Chartwell Staffing Solutions), a temporary staffing company with operations in California, and served as its chairman and chief executive officer from around 2012 until 2018. Chartwell was later acquired by Partners Personnel in 2023.

Around the time of his resignation from Chartwell, Kidan moved to Lancaster County, Pennsylvania, settling in Manheim Township. In March 2019, he co-founded Atlantic Solutions Group, a Delaware-based company that trades as Empire Workforce Solutions, and became its president.

Kidan also serves as vice chairman of the Staffing Advisory Group.

=== Political activity and 2026 pardon ===
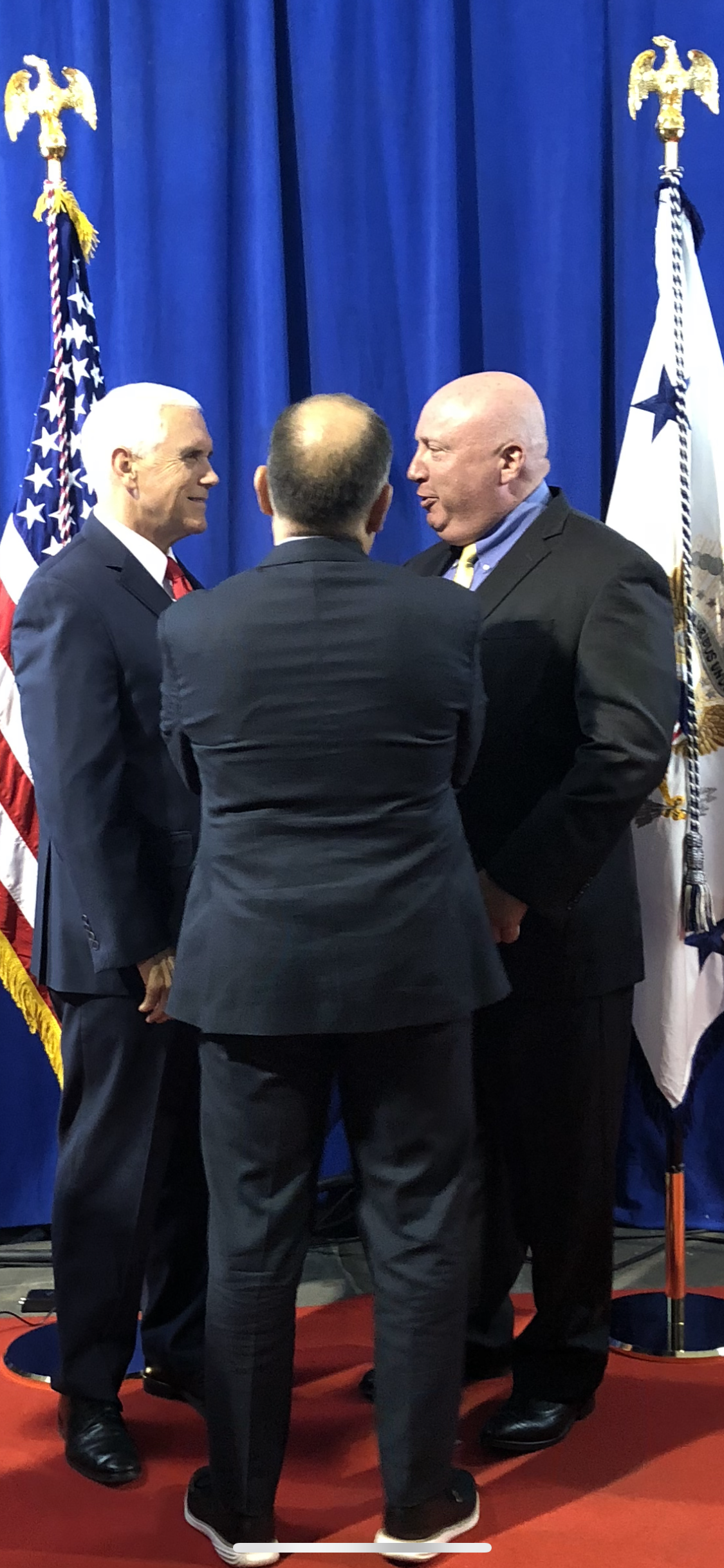
Adam Kidan with former Vice President of the United States, Mike Pence

Earlier in his political career, Kidan served as New York co-chair of Youth for Reagan/Bush ’84 and later as chairman of Young Professionals for Bush. He also worked on Donald Beyer’s 1997 campaign for governor of Virginia. Kidan became a major donor to Republican candidates and committees after his release from prison. Since 2017, he has contributed at least US$350,000 in direct and in-kind contributions to political committees affiliated with U.S. Representative Lloyd Smucker of Pennsylvania, making him one of Smucker's largest individual donors. He also became a member of Trump's Mar-a-Lago Club, where in February 2023 he married Cristiani De Fatima Pereira, and hosted fundraisers for Republican candidates including Pennsylvania state treasurer Stacy Garrity. Between April 2023 and February 2024, he contributed a total of US$750,000 to the pro-Trump Super PAC Make America Great Again Inc.

On 3 July 2026, President Donald Trump granted Kidan a full pardon for his 2006 fraud and conspiracy convictions, one of eleven pardons issued that day. In announcing the pardon, the White House said that employment agencies and staffing companies Kidan had worked for or led had helped secure entry-level jobs for more than 250,000 people.

Three days before the pardon, Kidan donated to the leadership political action committee of Ryan Mackenzie, a Republican member of Congress from Pennsylvania then facing a competitive re-election contest. Mackenzie's office stated that the congressman had never advocated for the pardon.

== Personal life ==
Kidan has been married twice. His first marriage was to Tracy Schneider, with whom he has a daughter, Sloane. Schneider was the sole shareholder of Chartwell Staffing Services, which the couple built together. Kidan initiated divorce proceedings in Pennsylvania in 2017, and the separation gave rise to protracted litigation over control of Chartwell and related trade secrets claims filed in California federal court in 2019. Their divorce was finalized on September 29, 2023.

In February 2023, Kidan married Brazilian-born Cristiani De Fatima Pereira, some 23 years his junior, in a ceremony at Mar-a-Lago attended by Donald Trump and Melania Trump, with a performance by tenor Andrea Bocelli. He resides in Palm Beach Gardens, Florida.

== In popular culture ==
Kidan was portrayed by Jon Lovitz in the 2010 biographical satire Casino Jack, directed by George Hickenlooper and starring Kevin Spacey as Abramoff.
