= Miami Grill =

American restaurant chain

Coordinates: 26.4083°N 80.1033°W

- Type: Private
- Industry: Restaurant
- Founded: 1988; 38 years ago
- Founder: Gus Boulis
- Headquarters: Fort Lauderdale, Florida
- Number of locations: 31
- Area served: Florida, South Carolina, Nevada
- Number of employees: 600
- Website: mymiamigrill.com

Miami Grill, formerly Miami Subs Grill, is an American privately held restaurant chain, based in the US state of Florida. The chain has approximately 30 locations, the majority of which are in Miami-Dade, Broward, and Palm Beach counties of Florida. The company's menu consists of such items as wings, philly cheesesteak sandwiches, and Gyros along with items from Arthur Treacher's and Nathan's Famous hot dogs, all of which operate co-branding agreements with Miami Grill, and which were corporate siblings of Miami Subs from 1999 to 2007.

== History ==
=== Founding ===
The founder of the company, Gus Boulis, helped build the Mr. Submarine, now known as Mr. Sub, restaurant chain in Canada from a single location to over 200 locations, after which he retired to Florida. In 1980, he opened another restaurant in Key West called Mr. Submarine, which later expanded into Miami Subs Grill, offering a greater variety of food, all cooked to order.

=== Expansion ===
Miami Subs Grill built this concept and expanded rapidly in the '90s, starting in Florida and spreading quickly nationwide, with new restaurant locations, as well as stores in less typical locations, such as schools, highway rest areas (particularly along Florida's Turnpike) and airports. The restaurants featured a distinctive exterior design with South Beach-inspired pastels trimmed with pink and blue neon lights and interiors decorated in a tropical motif.

=== Co-branding agreement ===
A 1998 agreement added Arthur Treacher's fish and chips to the Miami Subs Grill concept. A planned merger between the two companies failed, however, when Arthur Treacher's stock value dropped precipitously.

=== Purchase and sale ===
In 1999, Nathan's Famous purchased the chain for $14.4 million, bringing the Miami Subs Grill and Arthur Treacher's brands under a common corporate umbrella. The chain had approximately 175 outlets at acquisition. However, the chain struggled, due in part to instability in the management ranks, and in 2007, Nathan's Famous announced the sale of Miami Subs to a private investment group, Miami Subs Capital Partner 1 Inc, for $3.3 million.

=== International expansion and partnership ===
At the time of the sale, the chain operated in nearly 60 locations, including one in Turkey. 40 additional restaurants were planned in Turkey, but were never completed. Another location was under construction in Romania, where 20 restaurants were planned, but never completed either.

On July 24, 2012, Miami Subs announced that an equity stake in the chain was purchased by Armando Cristian Pérez, known by his stage name, Pitbull.

In February 2013, Miami Subs announced an agreement to develop new stores in the Middle East GCC countries: Saudi Arabia, Kuwait, United Arab Emirates, Oman, Qatar and Bahrain. However, these stores never came to fruition.

=== Rebrand to Miami Grill ===
Starting in 2014, the company decided to change their branding strategy by gradually changing to a new branding concept called Miami Grill.

=== Future plans ===
In April 2020, Miami Grill announced plans to eliminate their dining rooms and install two drive-through lanes, a walk-up order window and a mobile order pick-up area to every location, which would accommodate the changing times as fewer people dine in at restaurants.
