= Deaths in July 1980 =

The following is a list of notable deaths in July 1980.

Entries for each day are listed alphabetically by surname. A typical entry lists information in the following sequence:

- Name, age, country of citizenship at birth, subsequent country of citizenship (if applicable), reason for notability, cause of death (if known), and reference.

== July 1980 ==
=== 1 ===
- Horma Ould Babana, 68, Mauritanian politician.
- Curtis Coleman, 93, American baseball player.
- Tom Farmer, 59, American football player.
- William Hartston, 75, English physician.
- Jack Laybourne, 53, English footballer.
- Henry W. Lever, 96, American college sports coach, traffic collision.
- Hilmar Reksten, 82, Norwegian shipping magnate.
- Slugger Ann, 74, American bar owner.
- C. P. Snow, 74, English novelist (Strangers and Brothers) and chemist.
- Tadao Takayama, 76, Japanese footballer.
- Shields Warren, 82, American pathologist.

=== 2 ===
- Tom Barry, 83, Irish guerrilla leader (Irish Republican Army).
- Arnold Campbell, 73, New Zealand educationalist.
- Consetta Caruccio-Lenz, 61, American Olympic gymnast (1936, 1948).
- William Dauber, 45, American mobster, murdered.
- Sir Alan Hitchman, 76, English civil servant.
- Michael Isaacs, 3rd Marquess of Reading, 64, British banker and hereditary peer.
- Julião Menezes, 70, Indian writer and nationalist activist.
- Daniel Gillette Olney, 70, American sculptor.
- Elias Pereira, 63–64, Singaporean educationalist.
- Burt Procter, 79, American painter.
- Ruth Tappe Scruggs, 86, American clubwoman.
- Tim Trevaskis, 77, Australian footballer.
- Amos White, 90, American jazz trumpeter.
- Khun Wichitmatra, 82, Thai government official, writer and filmmaker.

=== 3 ===
- Sir Adesoji Aderemi, 90, Nigerian politician and Yoruba ruler.
- Buster Bennett, 66, American blues musician.
- Charles Benstead, 84, English cricketer and academic administrator.
- Robert Bestwick, 80, English cricketer.
- Deng Hua, 73, Chinese general.
- Virgil Harris, 68, American baseball player.
- Zdzisław Krasnodębski, 75, Polish pilot.
- Walter Ladengast, 80, Austrian actor.
- Abdelhamid Sharaf, 40, Jordanian politician, prime minister (since 1979), heart attack.
- Bertha Fanning Taylor, 96, American painter.
- Yuri Terapiano, 87, Russian-French writer, poet and literary critic.
- J. V. Wilson, 83, American soldier and songwriter ("Aggie War Hymn").

=== 4 ===
- Gregory Bateson, 76, English anthropologist.
- Erich Dethleffsen, 75, German general.
- Gerd Frickhöffer, 66, German actor.
- Jascha Gopinko, 88, Russian-Australian violinist.
- Maurice Grevisse, 84, Belgian linguist.
- Edward Hald, 96, Swedish sculptor.
- Willem Louw, 59, South African general.
- Jack Martin, 93, American baseball player, heart attack.
- Alberto Nicasio, 77, Argentine artist.
- Pedro Vallana, 82, Spanish-Uruguayan football player and manager.
- Charles Van Enger, 89, American cinematographer.

=== 5 ===
- Bernard J. Bischoff, 49, American politician, drowned.
- John Keller, 70, Canadian Olympic boxer (1932).
- Don Nicholl, 54, English-American screenwriter, cancer.
- A. J. Potter, 61, Irish composer.
- Stuart Rigold, 60, British archaeologist and photographer.
- Sir James Ross, 1st Baronet, 85, British surgeon and life peer.
- Luis Sandrini, 75, Argentine actor and film producer.
- Ary Abramovich Sternfeld, 75, Polish-Soviet aerospace engineer.
- Ben Tincup, 87, American baseball player, heart attack.
- Thaddäus Troll, 66, German journalist and poet, suicide by drug overdose.
- Archie Young, 73, Scottish footballer.
- William Gould Young, 77, American chemist and academic administrator.

=== 6 ===
- Frank Cordell, 62, British composer and conductor.
- Walt Craddock, 48, American baseball player, heart attack.
- Katherine Whitney Curtis, 83, American swimmer and swim instructor, developer of synchronized swimming.
- Jeanie Dicks, 86, British electrical engineer.
- George Eash, 69, American electrical engineer, intestinal disease.
- Chananya Yom Tov Lipa Goldman, 72–75, Hungarian-American rabbi and publisher.
- Mary Hignett, 64, British actress, complications from hip surgery.
- Herman Mattson, 79, New Zealand rugby player.
- Gail Patrick, 69, American actress and television producer (Perry Mason), leukemia.
- Mart Raud, 76, Estonian poet and playwright.
- Sir Ralph Windham, 75, British jurist and colonial official.

=== 7 ===
- John Anundson, 88, American politician, member of the South Dakota House of Representatives (1949–1954).
- Tull Considine, 81, Irish hurler and footballer.
- Prince Dmitri Alexandrovich, 78, Russian royal.
- Reginald Gardiner, 77, English actor, heart attack.
- Gorham Getchell, 59, American basketball and football player.
- Gedaliah Aharon Koenig, 59, Israeli rabbi.
- Johannes Meintjes, 57, South African writer and artist.
- John Morley, 37, Irish footballer and detective, shot.
- M. Aloysius Peach, 87, American poet and nun.
- Dore Schary, 74, American playwright, film director (Act One) and producer.
- Chink Taylor, 82, American baseball player.
- Dan White, 72, American actor.
- Wilhelm Zoepf, 72, German Nazi official.

=== 8 ===
- Don G. Abel, 85, American jurist.
- Allen M. Burdett Jr., 58, American general, cancer.
- Rudolf Creutz, 84, Austrian Nazi official.
- Wenty Ford, 33, Bahamian baseball player, traffic collision.
- Dan Healy, 85, American police detective.
- Erich Marckhl, 78, Austrian composer and musicologist.
- Gertrude Morgan, 80, American artist and preacher.
- Hans-Joachim Schoeps, 71, German religious historian.
- Paddy Whannel, 57, British academic.
- Katrina Zepps, 61, Russian-born Australian nurse.

=== 9 ===
- Nazario Belmar, 60, Spanish footballer and film producer.
- Ian Botting, 58, New Zealand rugby player, traffic collision.
- Vinicius de Moraes, 66, Brazilian poet, playwright and lyricist ("The Girl from Ipanema").
- Norris Graham, 74, American Olympic rower (1932).
- Arend Heyting, 82, Dutch mathematician.
- Juan Larrea, 85, Spanish poet and essayist.
- Synnøve Lie, 71, Norwegian speed skater.
- Leo Mohn, 55, American politician, member of the Wisconsin State Assembly (1971–1979), heart attack.
- Peter Strausfeld, 69, German-born British artist, illustrator and animator.
- John E. Volkmann, 74–75, American architect and sound engineer.

=== 10 ===
- Doris Fleischman, 88, American feminist, public relations executive and writer, stroke.
- Komako Kimura, 92, Japanese suffragist, magazine editor, and theater manager.
- Joseph Krumgold, 72, American writer and screenwriter.
- Grigory Novak, 61, Soviet Olympic weightlifter (1952), heart attack.
- Gerard Pappa, 36, American mobster (Genovese crime family), shot.
- Francisco Rebolo, 77, Brazilian painter and footballer.
- Alfredo Sivocci, 89, Italian racing cyclist.
- Leonidas Zervas, 78, Greek chemist.

=== 11 ===
- Zygmunt Berling, 84, Polish general and politician.
- Skipper Heard, 81, American college athletics director.
- Peggy Knudsen, 57, American actress, cancer.
- Jake Lawlor, 72, American football player and coach, cancer.
- Jack Mann, 60, Canadian ice hockey player.
- Shellie McMillon, 44, American basketball player.
- Arsène Mersch, 66, Luxembourgish racing cyclist.
- Léon Tallon, 72, French Olympic swimmer (1928).

=== 12 ===
- William Armstrong, Baron Armstrong of Sanderstead, 65, British banker, civil servant and life peer.
- Donald Beatty, 80, American aviator, explorer and inventor.
- John Warren Davis, 92, American academic administrator and civil rights activist, heart attack.
- Pedro García, 52, Peruvian Olympic sports shooter (1960).
- William N. McQueen, 71, American attorney and politician, Alabama attorney general (1943–1947).
- Mario Medda, 37, Italian Olympic pentathlete (1968, 1972, 1976).
- Bill Morrow, 91, Australian politician and trade unionist.
- Bea Orpen, 67, Irish painter.
- Charles Payne, 74, Irish rugby player.
- Geert Pijnenburg, 83, Belgian poet and writer.
- Bachubhai Ravat, 82, Indian newspaper editor and art critic.
- Pierre Satre, 71, French aerospace engineer (Concorde).

=== 13 ===
- Werner Betz, 67, German linguist and historian.
- Joseph Brennan, 67, Irish politician, TD (since 1951).
- Gösta Ehrensvärd, 70, Swedish chemist.
- Robert MacLaren Fowler, 73, Canadian lawyer.
- Alf Jewett, 80, English footballer.
- Sir Seretse Khama, 59, Botswanan politician, president (since 1966), pancreatic cancer.
- Hariprasad Vyas, 71, Indian author and humorist.

=== 14 ===
- Felix Berezin, 49, Soviet mathematician and physicist, drowned.
- Joseph Berthet, 80, French Olympic rower (1928).
- Hans Binder, 70, Austrian Olympic rower (1936).
- Aneirin Talfan Davies, 71, Welsh poet, literary critic and broadcaster.
- Ford Quint Elvidge, 87, American politician, governor of Guam (1953–1956).
- Kristian Kristiansen, 70, Norwegian author.
- Carlos López Moctezuma, 70, Mexican actor.
- Len Reynolds, 56, Australian politician, MP (1958–1966, 1969–1975).
- Norman Shelton, 75, New Zealand politician, MP (1954–1972), heart disease.
- Nadia Sibirskaïa, 78, French actress.
- Klemens Stefan Sielecki, 76, Polish engineer.
- Alan Valentine, 79, American academic administrator, government official and Olympic rugby player (1924).

=== 15 ===
- Diego Cisneros, 68, Cuban-born Venezuelan businessman (Grupo Cisneros).
- Sven Helleberg, 51, Norwegian politician.
- Henri Martelli, 85, French composer.
- Ben Selvin, 82, American musician, bandleader and record producer, heart attack.
- Paul Valcke, 66, Belgian Olympic fencer (1948).
- Eda Warren, 76, American film editor.
- Seyyed Javad Zabihi, 48–49, Iranian muezzin, murdered.

=== 16 ===
- Robert Brackman, 81, American artist, cancer.
- Arthur Daer, 74, English cricketer.
- Jeanna Falk, 78, Swedish dancer and dance teacher.
- Eddie Jackson, 84, American vaudeville performer, stroke.
- Hubert Jedin, 80, German historian and theologian.
- William O. Mehrtens, 75, American jurist, complications from heart surgery.
- Dick Romey, 75, American football player.
- Vadim Tikunov, 59, Soviet politician and diplomat.
- Maria Elizabeth van Ebbenhorst Tengbergen, 95, Dutch composer and organist.
- Ernie Vick, 80, American football and baseball player.

=== 17 ===
- Don "Red" Barry, 70, American actor (Adventures of Red Ryder), suicide by gunshot.
- James Cabell Bruce, 87, American banker and diplomat.
- Frank Collymore, 87, Barbadian writer.
- Boris Delaunay, 90, Soviet mathematician and mountain climber.
- Desha Delteil, 81, Slovenian-French dancer and model.
- Wim Dooijewaard, 87, Dutch painter.
- Frank W. Fries, 87, American politician, member of the U.S. House of Representatives (1937–1941).
- Pierre Garbay, 76, French general.
- Traian Herseni, 73, Romanian sociologist and journalist.
- Ralph Jordan, 69, American football and basketball player and coach, leukemia.
- Sir Alan Mansfield, 77, Australian politician and jurist.
- Marcelo Quiroga Santa Cruz, 49, Bolivian politician and writer, murdered.
- Jos Schummer, 49, Luxembourgish Olympic wrestler (1952).
- Georg Stern, 58–59, German opera singer.

=== 18 ===
- Juan José Calandria, 77, Uruguayan artist.
- Alexander Durley, 67, American football coach.
- Thelma Golden, 65, Canadian softball player.
- János Komlós, 58, Hungarian journalist and comedian.
- Charles Rivett-Carnac, 78, English-Canadian police commissioner.
- Česlavs Stančiks, 83, Latvian footballer.
- Andrée Vaurabourg, 85, French pianist.
- Francisco Véliz, 91, Chilean politician.

=== 19 ===
- Wilfrid Airey, 72, New Zealand cricketer.
- Anita Bahn, 60, American epidemiologist, stroke.
- Bill Cookson, 79, Australian footballer.
- Margaret Craven, 79, American writer.
- Jean Frain de la Gaulayrie, 62, French Olympic sailor (1948, 1952).
- Gerold C. Dunn, 69, American jurist.
- Nihat Erim, 67, Turkish politician, prime minister (1971–1972), shot.
- Hans Morgenthau, 76, German-American political scientist and jurist.
- Sir Geoffrey Peren, 87, British-New Zealand agriculturist and academic administrator.
- Victor Sayaret, 90, French flying ace.
- Tu Chung-hsun, 43, Taiwanese film director, injuries sustained in a traffic collision.

=== 20 ===
- William P. Battell, 73, American general.
- Richard Beck, 83, Icelandic-American poet and literary historian.
- Piet Bouman, 87, Dutch footballer.
- Valentin Brück, 69, German politician.
- Vic Cavanagh, 71, New Zealand cricketer, rugby union administrator and newspaper executive.
- Gerard Croiset, 71, Dutch parapsychologist and psychic.
- Roger de Vilmorin, 74, French botanist and geneticist, illegitimate son of Alfonso XIII of Spain.
- John Grimshaw, 87, English soldier.
- Lado Gudiashvili, 84, Soviet Georgian painter.
- Maria Martinez, c. 93, American Pueblo ceramicist.
- James Morris, 87, American attorney and jurist.
- Kate Campbell Muirhead, 87, Scottish sculptor.
- Laurie Murphy, 80, Australian footballer.
- James Pigot, 79, Irish cricketer.
- Oszkár Vilezsál, 49, Hungarian footballer.

=== 21 ===
- Salah al-Din al-Bitar, 68, Syrian politician, prime minister (1963, 1964, 1966), co-founder of the Ba'ath Party, shot.
- Dakky Kiær, 87, Norwegian politician and feminist activist.
- Isabella Leitch, 90, British nutritionist.
- Rostislav Petera, 70, Czechoslovak politician.
- P. Govindasamy Pillai, 93, Indian-Singaporean businessman and philanthropist, heart attack.
- Øistein Strømnæs, 66, Norwegian intelligence operative and biologist.

=== 22 ===
- Bob Bawden, 63, Australian footballer.
- Bobby Berns, 84, American football player.
- Hans-Georg Bürger, 28, German racing driver, racing crash.
- Pierre Coquelin de Lisle, 80, French Olympic sports shooter (1924).
- Robin Dey, 58, Indian novelist and actor.
- Gunvor Katharina Eker, 73, Norwegian politician.
- Lucien Faucheux, 80, French racing cyclist.
- Robert H. H. Hugman, 78, American architect.
- Knud Blak Jensen, 54, Danish footballer.
- Marty Mann, 75, American writer.
- E. Blackburn Moore, 83, American politician, member of the Virginia House of Delegates (1933–1968).
- Arvind Pandya, 57, Indian actor, stroke.
- Ali Akbar Tabatabaei, 49, Iranian diplomat, shot.
- Kemal Türkler, 53–54, Turkish politician and trade unionist, shot.

=== 23 ===
- William H. Bennett, 69, American Mormon leader, heart attack.
- Alfonso Carlos Comín, 46–47, Spanish politician and industrial engineer, cancer.
- Sarto Fournier, 72, Canadian politician, mayor of Montreal (1957–1960), MP (1935–1953), cancer.
- Keith Godchaux, 32, American pianist (Grateful Dead), traffic collision.
- Eliot Hyman, 75, American film executive.
- Sir George Johnson, 76, British general.
- Max Kadushin, 84, Russian-born American rabbi and theologian.
- Fred Kaps, 54, Dutch magician, cancer.
- Joshua MacArthur, 68, Canadian politician.
- Olivia Manning, 72, British novelist, complications from a stroke.
- Daria Nyzankiwska-Snihurowycz, 67, Russian-Canadian ballerina and ballet teacher.
- Vinton Rambo, 71, American college sports coach.
- Mollie Steimer, 82, Russian-born Mexican anarchist activist and photographer, heart failure.
- Wally Snell, 91, American baseball player, college athletics administrator, and mycologist.
- Riad Taha, 52–53, Lebanese journalist and publisher, shot.
- Stan Thompson, 72, English footballer.
- Franco Tognini, 72, Italian Olympic gymnast (1932, 1936).
- Frederick L. Warder, 67, American politician, member of the New York State Assembly (1963–1972) and State Senate (since 1973), cancer.

=== 24 ===
- J. S. Brenner, 69, American politician, member of the Montana House of Representatives (1949–1952) and State Senate (1952–1966).
- J. G. Fox, 64, American nuclear physicist.
- Binoy Ghosh, 63, Indian journalist and sociologist.
- Davis Grubb, 61, American novelist (The Night of the Hunter).
- Benjamin R. Jones, 74, American jurist.
- Nick Kearns, 60, Australian politician.
- Uttam Kumar, 53, Indian actor, filmmaker and composer, heart attack.
- Philippe Le Corbeiller, 89, French-American physicist and electrical engineer.
- Adolf Leschnitzer, 81, German-American historian.
- Peter Sellers, 54, British actor (Dr. Strangelove, The Pink Panther) and comedian (The Goon Show), heart attack.
- Xiang Runkun, 73, Taiwanese politician.

=== 25 ===
- Rolf Andersen, 83, Norwegian diplomat.
- Horace Aylwin, 77, Canadian Olympic sprinter (1924).
- Tony Catalano, 85, American boxer and football player.
- Pierre Courcelle, 68, French historian.
- Erich Fuchs, 78, German Nazi official and war criminal.
- Euphemia Haynes, 89, American mathematician and educator.
- George Ormond, 90, Scottish footballer.
- Vladimir Vysotsky, 42, Soviet singer and actor, heart attack.
- Wang Jian'an, 72, Chinese general.
- Cornelius T. Young, 72, American politician, member of the Wisconsin State Assembly (1931–1939) and State Senate (1939–1943), cancer.

=== 26 ===
- Yehoshua Alouf, 80, Russian-born Israeli sports administrator and writer.
- Peter René Oscar Bally, 85, Swiss botanist.
- Bert Cooksley, 88, New Zealand politician, MP (1949–1963).
- Norman Creek, 82, English footballer.
- François Louis Ganshof, 85, Belgian historian.
- Allen Hoskins, 59, American actor (Our Gang), cancer.
- Ibn-e-Safi, 52, Pakistani novelist, pancreatic cancer.
- Carl F. Kraenzel, 73, American sociologist.
- Fritz Müller, 54, Swiss glaciologist, heart attack.
- Federico Munerati, 78, Italian footballer.
- León Pacheco Solano, 82, Costa Rican writer and journalist.
- Hans Huitfeldt Riddervold, 52, Norwegian media executive.
- Joseph John Ruocco, 58, American Roman Catholic prelate.
- Enrique Seoane Ros, 65, Peruvian architect.
- Gaby Sylvia, 60, Italian-French actress, heart attack.
- Kenneth Tynan, 53, English theatre critic, emphysema.

=== 27 ===
- Rushdy Abaza, 53, Egyptian actor, brain cancer.
- Tomás Beswick, 68, Argentine Olympic sprinter (1936).
- Majel Coleman, 77, American actress.
- Herbert Cragg, 69, British Anglican prelate.
- Florentino Goikoetxea, 82, Spanish-French smuggler and humanitarian (Comet Line).
- Billy James, 58, Welsh footballer.
- Pierre Juhel, 69, French journalist.
- Gene Kardos, 81, American jazz bandleader.
- Mohammad Reza Pahlavi, 60, Iranian royal, shah (1941–1979), complications from surgery.
- Oliver Schreiner, 89, South African jurist.
- Gerard van Walsum, 80, Dutch politician.

=== 28 ===
- Claude Henry da Silva, 88–89, Singaporean lawyer.
- Georg Dragičević, 89, Croatian soldier.
- Joaquín Garrigues Walker, 46, Spanish politician, heart attack.
- John Gottfried, 62, Canadian politician.
- Adolfo Grosso, 52, Italian racing cyclist.
- Albert W. Hachmeister, 62, American politician and publisher, member of the Illinois House of Representatives (1952–1966).
- Walter Merrill Hall, 92, American tennis player and administrator.
- Naoomal Jeoomal, 76, Indian cricketer.
- Dimo Kazasov, 93, Bulgarian politician and journalist.
- Estebán Pelaó, 82, Spanish footballer.
- Rose Rand, 77, Austrian-American logician and philosopher.
- Tamás Rényi, 51, Hungarian film director.
- Haydée Santamaría, 57, Cuban politician and revolutionary, suicide.
- Tuatagaloa Leutele Teʻo, 72, Western Samoan politician.
- Sir Cullum Welch, 84, British politician and businessman.

=== 29 ===
- William J. Baroody Sr., 64, American political advisor, heart attack.
- Prosper Ellis, 84, Australian golfer, golf course architect and surveyor.
- Filipp Golikov, 80, Soviet army marshal.
- Troy Leon Gregg, 32, American convicted murderer and landmark death penalty case (Gregg v. Georgia), bludgeoned.
- Neville Hudson, 56, Australian politician.
- Shigeno Kibe, 76, Japanese aviator.
- Adelheid Koch, 83–84, German-Brazilian psychoanalyst.
- Charles McGraw, 66, American actor, exsanguination.
- Fred Morgan, 87, South African Olympic sports shooter (1920).
- Adelbert Mühlschlegel, 83, German translator and Baháʼí Faith practitioner.
- Seff Parry, 72, Australian footballer.
- Józef Pokorski, 57, Polish footballer.
- Wenceslao Salgado, 80, Peruvian Olympic sports shooter (1948).
- Jan Tausinger, 58, Romanian-born Czech violinist and composer.
- Jerry Thomas, 51, American politician, member of the Florida Senate (1965–1972), cancer.
- Joop van der Heide, 63, Dutch footballer.
- Élisabeth van Rysselberghe, 89, Belgian translator.
- Marvin Weidner, 68, American politician, member of the Pennsylvania House of Representatives (since 1967), cancer.
- Frank Winters, 86, American football and basketball coach.

=== 30 ===
- Doug Bourne, 71, Australian footballer.
- Lucien Dalsace, 87, French actor.
- Alejandro Garretón, 79, Chilean physician, academic and politician.
- Gopal Ghose, 66, Indian painter.
- Norma Gould, 91–92, American dancer and choreographer, complications from dementia.
- Pascal Jardin, 46, French screenwriter.
- Anatole Kitain, 76, Russian-American pianist.
- Joe Lucey, 83, American baseball player.
- Howard Montgomery, 64, American football and basketball player and coach.
- Elli Schmidt, 71, German communist activist.
- Tommy Thomas, 81, Welsh-Canadian politician.

=== 31 ===
- Pascual Jordan, 77, German physicist and politician.
- Norman Lloyd, 70, American composer and pianist, leukemia.
- Peeter Matsov, 74, Estonian boxer.
- Edna Morton, 86, American actress.
- Nancy Northcroft, 67, New Zealand architect and urban planner.
- Mohammed Rafi, 55, Indian singer, heart attack.
- Carmen Tessier, 69, French journalist and columnist.
- Alfred Traeger, 84, Australian engineer and inventor (pedal radio).
- Bobby Van, 51, American actor and dancer, brain cancer.
