= Pyx Door =

Door in Westminster Abbey, London

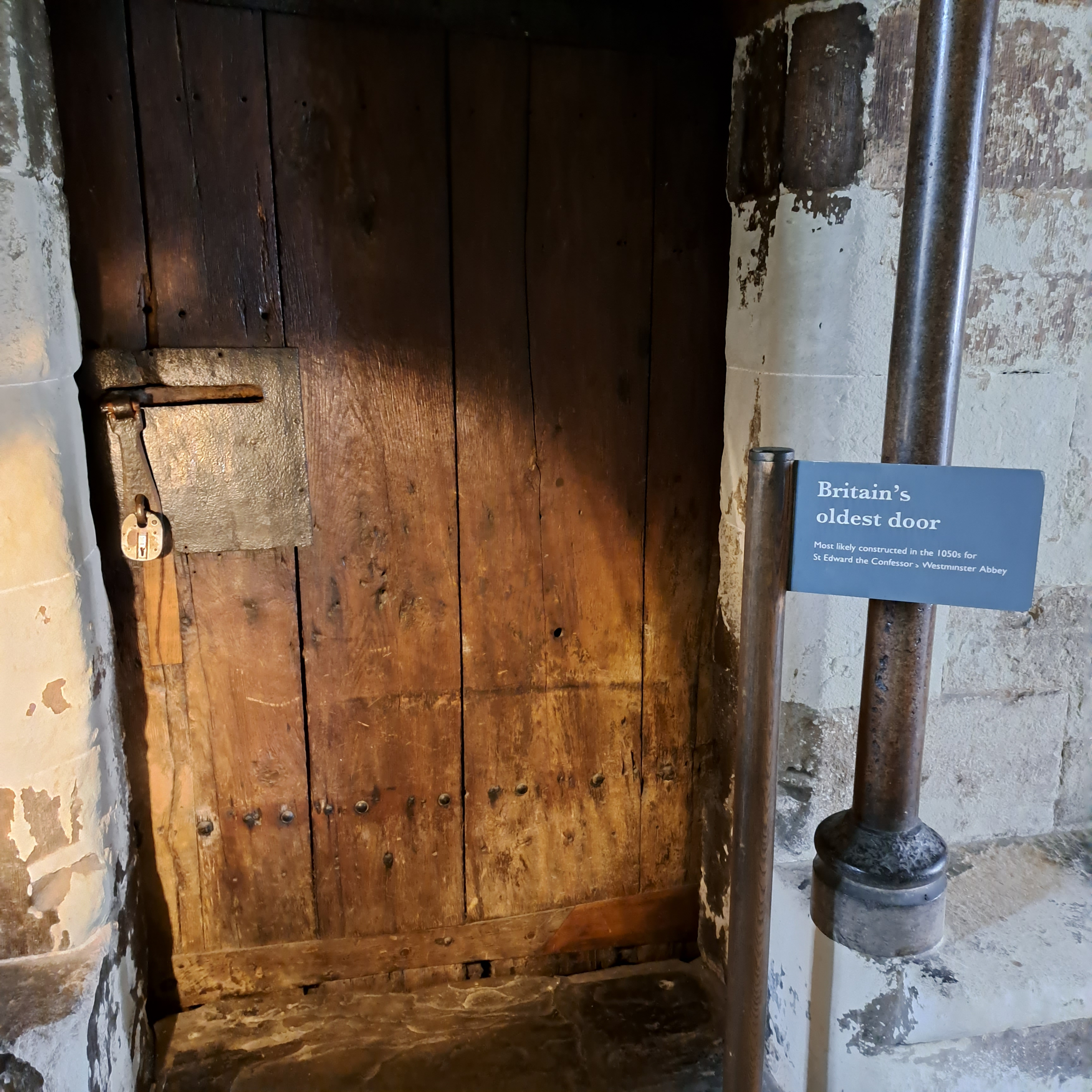
- Interactive map of Pyx Door
- Location: London, England
- Coordinates: 51.499007°N 0.127263°W
- Material: Oak
- Width: 1.27 metres (4 ft 2 in)
- Height: 1.98 metres (6 ft 6 in)

The Pyx Door, often described as the chapter house vestibule door, is a wooden door which stands in a southern bay of the outer vestibule of Westminster Abbey's chapter house. The door is considered to be "Britain's oldest door", as well as the only surviving door from Anglo-Saxon England. The felling date has been established by dendrochronology as falling between 1032 and 1064.

== Description ==
=== Setting ===
Despite often being known as the "Pyx Door". The door does not lead into the Pyx Chamber. Instead it connects the outer vestibule of Westminster Abbey's chapter house to a small room often described as a cellar. The door holds heritage status as part of the scheduled monument of The Chapter House and Pyx Chamber in the abbey cloisters, Westminster Abbey.

=== Design ===
The door's design is particular due to its Anglo-Saxon origins and differs from doors of the Norman period. The door consists of five vertical boards and was trimmed to fit its current position, both in its width but particularly in its height. The door originally had a semi-circular top.

The door is of oak with ironwork features including an original central strap. The decorative hinge straps no longer remain although their presence is visible by nail holes.

Fragments of leather and hide remain underneath the hinges with further evidence it once covered the entire door shown in knife score marks where it was cut off. Animal hide coverings for wooden objects was common in Anglo-Saxon England. The use of hide on both sides suggests it was a decorated and considered an important door, with the hide once painted.

== History ==
The door was made from wood originally felled from between 1032 and 1064 and used in the original construction of Westminster Abbey under Edward the Confessor. It is exceptional that the door survived the rebuilding work carried out by Henry III in the 13th-century, when it would have been moved from its original location.

The fragments of hide remaining on the door were found in the 19th-century and sprouted a legend that they were of human skin, said to be of a man who was convicting of committing a crime.

=== Dating ===
The door was little-known in the 20th-century but was mentioned by certain historians for its potential exceptional age. Stuart Rigold tentatively suggested it to be of 11th-century origins in 1976 with Jane Geddes giving it a rough dating of around 1100 in 1999. Cecil Hewett would remark in 1978 that "it has long been held by some that this fragment was once part of the Pyx Chapel of Edward the Confessor's Building", possibly as a result of the door's unique design.

Dendrochronology was first attempted in the 1970s although the process proved unreliable and was therefore unpublished. A second and successful attempt to date the door was carried out in 2005 alongside other old doors in Westminster Abbey. Following the dating of the Pyx door, a claim arose for a door in St Boloph's Church in Hadstock, also of the 11th century, being older. There was however little substantial evidence to assert this claim.

== See also ==
- Bernward Doors
- Doors of the Roman Pantheon
