= Roy McConnell (footballer) =

Australian rules footballer

Personal information
- Full name: Harold Roy McConnell
- Born: 21 August 1927
- Died: 24 July 2003 (aged 75); Queensland
- Original team: Ascot Imperials
- Height: 188 cm (6 ft 2 in)
- Weight: 76 kg (168 lb)

Playing career^{1}
Years	Club	Games (Goals)
1949–1956	Essendon	135 (0)
- ^{1} Playing statistics correct to the end of 1956.

Career highlights
- Essendon premiership player 1949, 1950

Harold Roy McConnell (21 August 1927 – 24 July 2003) was an Australian rules footballer in the Victorian Football League (VFL).

== Family ==
He married Patricia Mae Carter on 29 October 1951.

== Football ==
He played for Essendon in the VFL.

[McConnell was] a strong, dashing defender. He was well known as close playing spoiler with good spring and unexpected speed in his long legs. Surprisingly, he had a vision range of not much more than fifty yards, but this never affected his play. He had a remarkable ability for such a big man and was a top full back and centre half back during his career. He was a member of the 1949 and 1950 premiership teams and burst into League prominence by beating Carlton star, Jack Howell, in the 1949 grand final.

== Controversial retirement ==
McConnell retired, controversially, at the end of the 1956 season.

Vice-Captain of the senior team, and its regular full-back, McConnell was selected as its 20th man in the last match of the season, against Geelong.

"He withdrew from the team [announcing his immediate retirement on the Friday] claiming that his form warranted a place in the eighteen. 'I have no grudge against Essendon, but I consider that I could have had a better go this season', he said."

The first emergency, John Towner, was appointed 20th man for the match.

== Essendon Football Club ==
McConnell served on the Essendon Football Club's Committee (1957-1965), was its secretary (1973-1979), following the retirement of Bill Cookson, and was its first general manager (1980).
