= János Komlós =

János Komlós may refer to:

- János Komlós (mathematician)
- János Komlós (writer)
