= Helleberg =

Helleberg may refer to:

== People ==
- Bo Helleberg (born 1974), Danish lightweight rower
- Jessica Helleberg (born 1986), Swedish handball player
- Sven Helleberg (1929–1980), Norwegian politician

== Places ==
- Helleberg (ridge) (297.5 m), a hill ridge in the Leine Uplands, in the counties of Hildesheim and Northeim, Lower Saxony, Germany
- Helleberg (Elfas) (409.6 m), the highest hill in the Elfas, in the county of Holzminden, Lower Saxony, Germany
- Helleberg (Ore Mountains), a summit in the Ore Mountains, in the county of Sächsische Schweiz-Osterzgebirge, Saxony, Germany
- Helleberg (Westerwald) (491.3 m), a hill in the Westerwald, in the county of Westerwaldkreis, Rhineland-Palatinate
