= Géza Hofi =

Hungarian actor and comedian

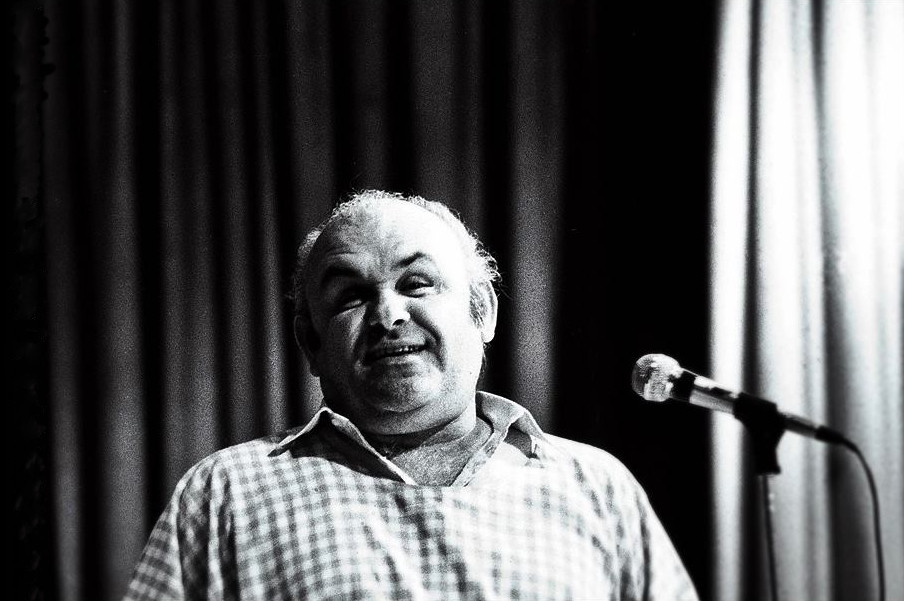
By Gáspár Stekovics

Géza Hofi (born Géza Hoffmann, 2 July 1936 in Budapest; died 10 April 2002 in Budapest) was a Hungarian actor and comedian. He is possibly the most popular Hungarian parodist of all time, who has had a strong influence on Hungarian cabaret.

== Biography ==
Hofi Géza was the highlight of Hungarian cabaret for decades. He never followed any pattern or trend; he was always following his own trail. His unique performances made him the most popular comedian of his time in Hungary. His death created an enormous vacuum in Hungarian comedy, and it is a common consensus among the people who witnessed his performances that there probably never would be another comedian like him. It couldn't exactly be categorised as stand-up comedy, though it didn't fit any other category either. There are no current comedians in Hungary who would try to emulate his style—his legacy on Hungarian humour is somewhat analogous to that of Beethoven's on German music in the 1800s. Tickets for his theatre shows were sold out many months in advance, and he usually performed his shows to packed auditoriums.

Being a "stand-up" comedian in a authoritarian regime was never an easy task. Hofi was walking on thin ice as he never passed up an opportunity to ridicule the obvious absurdities of the communist government. However, there are indications that his shows were viewed by those in power as a safe way to ease the people's frustration with the political system. In the decades following the anti-communist uprising of 1956 the government was careful not to shut down the voice of the people that Hofi stood for. Instead, they chose to let them laugh—and in particular to laugh at those in power. Hofi, however, never held back and he had to spend a few nights in prison on numerous occasions.

Hofi's historical significance — beyond his obvious merits as a comedian — was that he maintained his identity and dignity in a totalitarian regime in situations where most others would have been afraid to cross the line. His situation can never be compared to that of those stand-up comedians who make fun of politicians while they live in a country governed by a democratic government. Hofi often parodized János Kádár the communist leader of Hungary at the time—and in doing so it wasn't his impeccable match of Kádár's speech patterns that left those in the audience gasping for air, but rather an incisive critique of the contemporary politics.

== Career ==
He inherited his sense of criticism from his father, and he also claimed to have inherited his musicality from his mother. Géza Hoffmann, as he was then known, planned on enrolling at the Academy of Theatrical Arts, but he was not admitted. So instead he started working at a porcelain factory. He signed up to the theatrical school directed by Kálmán Rózsahegyi, where among others he met József Sas and István Sztankay, who later became both his colleagues and good friends. While working at the factory, he joined the theatrical association led by András Jászai. He had already been painting porcelain for five years when in 1960, József Szendrő, a well-known theatrical director of the time spotted his talents. He was offered a contract with the Csokonai theatre in Debrecen in September 1960. While an actor there, he was keen to parodize performances with his friends. As he made great progress with his parodies; in 1963, he decided to move back to his native Budapest, and the National Directing Agency gave him the permission to perform his shows under his stage name Hofi.

On New Year's Eve 1968, he performed a brilliant song-contest parody, on the Hungarian Radio that propelled him to stardom. He signed a contract with Mikroszkóp Theatre in 1969, where he remained until 1982. His director there was János Komlós. In 1983, he joined Madách Kamara at the invitation of Ottó Ádám, where he entertained the audience with his own scripts and dramaturgy. His show Hofélia was played more than 500 times, and his new show My Life's Worth was played some 1400 times, from October 1987. His performances were released on LP records several times, many of them have sold hundreds of thousands of copies. He recorded a song with János Koós, called Cowardly Cats, which was a smash hit. This was made into an animated film as well.

Hofi continued his career even after the end of socialism; his style, provocative humour, and the tone of his performances remained unchanged. He suffered a heart-attack in the early 1990s, and was also operated on his eye several times. He was disease-ridden during the early 2000s decade, but he returned to the stage for the last time in February 2002, performing for another two months. He died in his sleep on 10 April 2002. He is buried in the Farkasréti Cemetery among other famous Hungarian celebrities.

Hofi was probably one of the greatest stars on the Radio Cabaret, and his performances in the New Year's Eve programmes was a guarantee for success. The recording of his song : to relax! remained popular and often played on the radio even today.

In the Hungarian People's Republic, Géza Hofi was closely monitored in large part due to his criticisms of the political system. He alluded to it several times during his performances, jokingly addressing members of the party, secret agents and government snitches that sat in the audience. Besides he was monitored by the StB as well. Even though he was critical of the government, and János Kádár, who was then the head of state/government was often subject of his parodies, he received accolades on the state level as well. Even János Kádár said to appreciate and understand Hofi's performances to a certain extent. (Hofi never spent any substantial time in prison after all.)

== Awards and prizes ==
Géza Hofi was presented with awards several times, receiving some more than once.

- Jászai Mari Prize for Actors (1970, 1973)
- Merited Performer Award (1977)
- Excellent Performer Award (1988)
- Déryné Prize for Actors, a prize only for female performers, that Hofi gained alone as a male comedian so far (1995)
- Officer's Cross of the Order of the Republic of Hungary (1996)
- Kossuth Prize, the highest award for a performer (1998)
- Pro Cultura Urbis prize, presented by the Assembly of Budapest (2002)

Although it is not an award, it is worth mentioning that the statue called "Theatre", sculpted by Géza Stremeny, which was erected in front of the main entrance of Mikroszkóp Theatre, was modelled after Hofi. This statue is popularly referred to as "the Hofi-statue", although many feel that it would be appropriate for him to receive another, more conventional statue.
