= Judge Choate =

Judge Choate may refer to:

- Emett Clay Choate (1891–1974), judge of the United States District Court for the Southern District of Florida
- William Gardner Choate (1830–1920), judge of the United States District Court for the Southern District of New York
