= Komlos =

Komlos or Komlós is a surname. Notable people with the surname include:

- János Komlós (mathematician) (born 1942), Hungarian-American mathematician,
- János Komlós (writer) (1922–1980), Hungarian writer, journalist, and stand-up comedian
- John Komlos (born 1944), American economic historian
- Juci Komlós (1919–2011), Hungarian film actress
- Marianna Komlos (1969–2004), Canadian bodybuilder
- Péter Komlós (1935–2017), Hungarian violinist
