= Sidney M. Aronovitz United States Courthouse =

Coordinates: 24.55873°N 81.80274°W

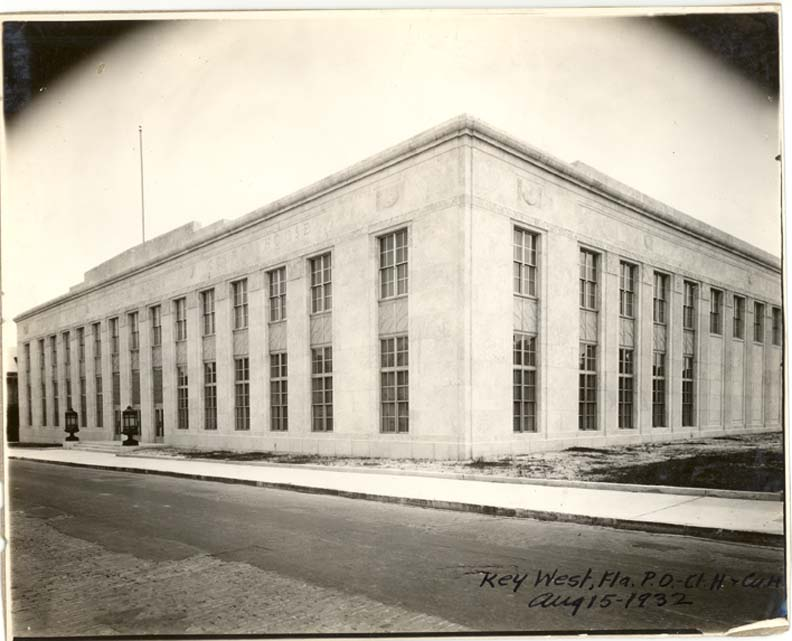
The Sidney M. Aronovitz United States Courthouse.

The Sidney M. Aronovitz United States Courthouse is a courthouse of the United States located in Key West, Florida. Built in 1932 and opened the following year, the courthouse replaced the Old Post Office and Customshouse in providing access to the United States District Court for the Southern District of Florida for residents of Monroe County, Florida. The building was originally named the U.S. Post Office, Custom House, and Courthouse. In October 2009, President Barack Obama signed into a law a bill introduced by Representative Ileana Ros-Lehtinen to rename the building for former longtime District Court judge Sidney M. Aronovitz, a third-generation Key West native.

The courthouse is located at 301 Simonton Street, in Key West.

== Significance ==
The passage of the Public Buildings Act of 1926 precipitated a period of building construction that was unprecedented in the United States. The Act specified that the office of the Supervising Architect of the Department of the Treasury would be responsible for the design and construction of all public buildings. The Key West Federal Building was constructed during this period, in 1930-1932. There is no documented architect, therefore it is believed that the plans came from the Office of the Supervising Architect under James A. Wetmore. Algernon Blair of Montgomery, Alabama was general contractor; Charles M. Pritchett was construction engineer. The original contract for the building designated $344,307 as the cost of construction. The building was built to be the U.S. Post Office, Courthouse and Custom House for Key West. The U.S. Post Office moved to a new building in 1985, but the Custom Service and Courts still remain. Other tenants are the U.S. Marshal's Service, the FBI and Social Security. The building is a contributing property located within the Key West Historic District and, as such, is listed on the National Register of Historic Places.

== Architectural description ==
The building is a two-story limestone clad building. It is constructed of Key Largo limestone quarried at the Windley key quarry, a site now owned by the state of Florida. It is a Deco interpretation of a classical style. The west elevation is the primary elevation. In the center of this elevation twelve engaged pilasters with decorative terra cotta caps support an entablature. The frieze of the entablature is incised and has a plain field on which are incised the words "POST OFFICE, CUSTOM HOUSE, COURT HOUSE". There is a decorative terra cotta block above the last bay of windows at each corner. This block is ornamented with two small fluted engaged pilasters flanking a swag-type design. There are two decorative belt courses spanning the perimeter of the building. One belt course is just above the second floor level windows. It consists of a series of palmiform designs. The second belt course is at the cornice level. It is a simple course of rod-like design. The main entry at the west elevation is somewhat changed from the original. The contemporary entrance doors are bronze anodized storefront-type doors. A copper canopy has been added over the three main entry doors. Perhaps the most distinctive feature of the main elevation is a pair of massive bronze-framed urn-like light fixtures. These original fixtures are mounted on the low cheek walls which flank the main entry steps. The north elevation is similar to the west. The south elevation is the same except the five easternmost windows on the first floor are blocked-in with limestone. The former/original Custom Service seizure room is located in this area and the windows were designed to be blocked-in for security purposes. Though of similar finishes and design, the east elevation and the light court are more utilitarian in nature than the other elevations. The east elevation is limestone clad and is the site of the loading dock. A small limestone, original pumphouse is adjacent to the building to the north at the east elevation. There is an open light court at the center of the building. The light court elevations are clad with buff brick. There are two one-story additions at the north and south within the light court. The north addition was constructed first; the south addition is fairly recent, though the exact date is undetermined.

The corridors and entry lobby of the U.S. Post Office, Courthouse, and Custom House in Key West have retained, in spite of some changes, most of the original features and finishes. The entry lobby opens off the west elevation with three entry doors. The lobby is divided into two bays. The first bay serves as the entry. Two columns and two engaged pilasters of the Corinthian order visually divide the entry vestibule of the lobby from the corridor area. Four engaged pilasters on the easternmost wall of the corridor mirror the columns/pilasters of the entry lobby. The lobby floors are terrazzo. The walls are painted plaster with marble wainscot to 3'. The marble is not original. When the building was constructed the main staircase provided the only vertical transportation (the elevator was installed in 1985). The stairs are marble-clad. The handrail is satin finish aluminum with a fluted starting newel, and alternating open panels and panels with cornstalk detail. The rail cap is wood.

The original main courtroom is located on the second floor. The walls are covered with full-height paneled oak wainscot. The wainscot has a dentil-molded crown mold. The wood panel behind the judge's bench is simple with four fluted engaged pilasters and simple panels between. Most of the furnishings are original, with the exception of the jury box. The plaster ceiling is arched and of original height.

Though there are some original finishes remaining in the tenant spaces, these spaces have been modified over time to suit the needs of the tenants. On the second floor, a small Magistrates' Court has been built. Though this court is new, it maintains the spirit of the original courtroom in the paneled wainscot and decorative wood panel behind the judge's bench. The original aluminum door and window surrounds, and picture rail exist here. Throughout the tenant spaces, the original tongue and groove wood plank flooring has been covered by carpet. Most of the tenant spaces retain at least some of the original aluminum molding.

The building does not have a standard basement, but has an equipment room which is approximately 8' below grade. It also has two large rectangular cisterns containing potable water beneath the first floor, surrounded by narrow walkways.
