= Sidney Aronovitz =

American judge (1920–1997)

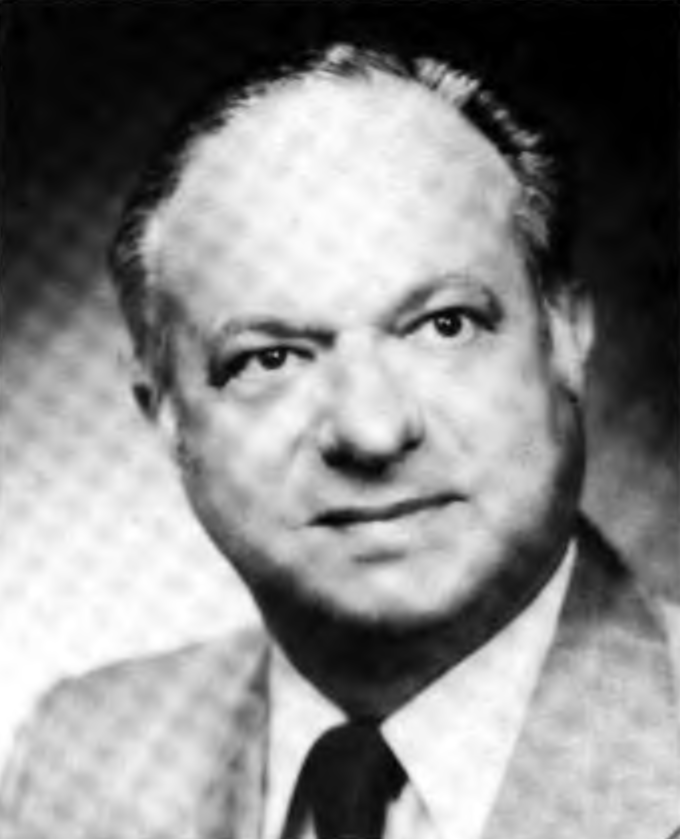

Judge of the United States Foreign Intelligence Surveillance Court
- In office June 8, 1989 – May 18, 1992
- Appointed by: William Rehnquist
- Preceded by: Lloyd Francis MacMahon
- Succeeded by: Charles Schwartz Jr.

Senior Judge of the United States District Court for the Southern District of Florida
- In office October 31, 1988 – January 8, 1997

Judge of the United States District Court for the Southern District of Florida
- In office September 21, 1976 – October 31, 1988
- Appointed by: Gerald Ford
- Preceded by: William O. Mehrtens
- Succeeded by: Donald L. Graham

Vice Mayor of Miami
- In office 1965
- Preceded by: David T. Kennedy
- Succeeded by: Alice Wainwright

Member of the Miami City Commission
- In office 1962–1966

Personal details
- Born: Sidney Myer Aronovitz; June 20, 1920 Key West, Florida, U.S.
- Died: January 8, 1997 (aged 76) Miami, Florida, U.S.
- Education: University of Florida (BA, JD)

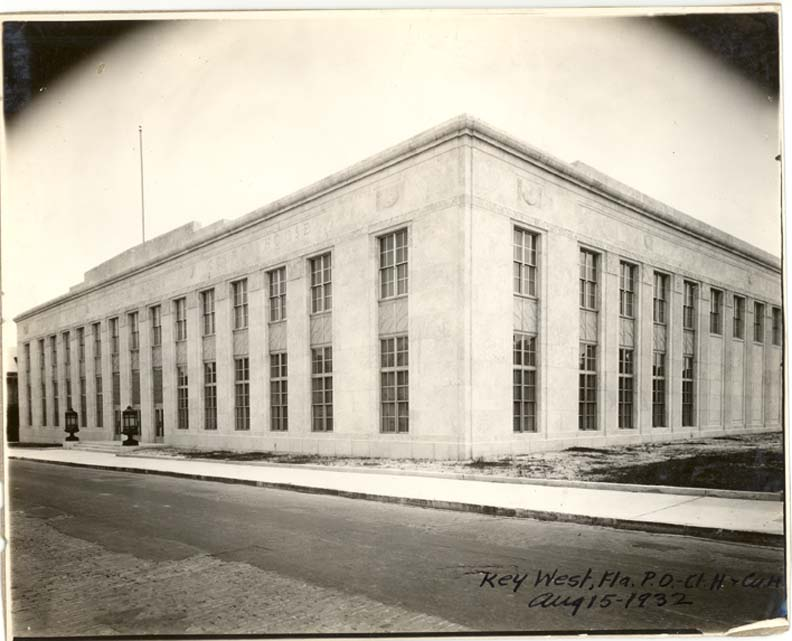
The Sidney M. Aronovitz United States Courthouse, in Key West, Florida.

Sidney Myer Aronovitz (June 20, 1920 – January 8, 1997) was an American lawyer who served as a United States district judge of the United States District Court for the Southern District of Florida.

== Education and career ==
Born on June 20, 1920, in Key West, Florida, Aronovitz was the son of a local textile merchant and a third-generation Key West native. He graduated from Key West High School in 1937, valedictorian and president of his class. He received his Bachelor of Arts degree from the University of Florida in 1942 and his Juris Doctor from the Fredric G. Levin College of Law at the University of Florida in 1943. Aronovitz served in the United States Army as a captain from 1943 to 1946, winning the Bronze Star. He was in private practice in Miami, Florida from 1946 to 1976, serving as a Miami city commissioner from 1962 to 1966 and as vice-mayor in 1965.

=== Federal judicial service ===
President Gerald Ford nominated Aronovitz to the United States District Court for the Southern District of Florida on August 4, 1976, to the seat vacated by Judge William O. Mehrtens. He was confirmed by the United States Senate on September 17, 1976, he received his commission four days later. Aronovitz assumed senior status on October 31, 1988, and remained on the court until his death in Miami on January 8, 1997.

=== Notable case ===
Among the cases presided over by Aronovitz was the claim of treasure hunter Mel Fisher to the Spanish galleon, Atocha.

== Honor ==
In October 2009, President Barack Obama signed into a law a bill introduced by Representative Ileana Ros-Lehtinen to rename the United States Post Office, Custom House, and Courthouse in Key West the Sidney M. Aronovitz United States Courthouse.

== See also ==
- List of Jewish American jurists

Legal offices
Preceded by William O. Mehrtens	Judge of the United States District Court for the Southern District of Florida; 1976–1988	Succeeded by Donald L. Graham
Preceded by Lloyd Francis MacMahon	Judge of the United States Foreign Intelligence Surveillance Court; 1989–1992	Succeeded by Charles Schwartz Jr.
