= Donald L. Graham =

American judge (born 1948)

Senior Judge of the United States District Court for the Southern District of Florida
- Incumbent
- Assumed office December 15, 2013

Judge of the United States District Court for the Southern District of Florida
- In office September 16, 1991 – December 15, 2013
- Appointed by: George H. W. Bush
- Preceded by: Sidney Aronovitz
- Succeeded by: Beth Bloom

Personal details
- Born: December 15, 1948 (age 77) Salisbury, North Carolina, U.S.
- Education: West Virginia State College (BA); Ohio State University (JD)

Donald L. Graham (born December 15, 1948) is a senior United States district judge of the United States District Court for the Southern District of Florida.

Graham was born in Salisbury, North Carolina. He received a Bachelor of Arts from West Virginia State College in 1971. He received a Juris Doctor from Ohio State University College of Law in 1974. He was an Adjunct instructor, University of Maryland from 1975 to 1977. He was in the United States Army Major, JAG Corps from 1974 to 1979. He was an assistant United States attorney of the Southern District of Florida from 1979 to 1984. He was in the United States Army Reserve, JAG Corps from 1983 to 1991. He was in private practice of law in Miami, Florida from 1984 to 1991.

Graham was a federal judge on the United States District Court for the Southern District of Florida. Graham was nominated by President George H. W. Bush on June 17, 1991, to a seat vacated by Sidney Aronovitz. He was confirmed by the United States Senate on September 12, 1991, and received commission on September 16, 1991.

== Biography ==
Graham was born in 1948 in Salisbury, North Carolina. He graduated from West Virginia State College in 1971 with a Bachelor of Arts degree in 1971 and from the Moritz College of Law at Ohio State University with a Juris Doctor in 1974. Graham served as an adjunct instructor at the University of Maryland University College (UMUC) from 1975 to 1977. He served in the United States Army Judge Advocate General's Corps from 1974 to 1979, holding the rank of captain, and in the Army Reserve JAG Corps from 1983 to 1991. Graham served as an assistant United States attorney for the Southern District of Florida from 1979 to 1984. He was in private practice in Miami from 1984 to 1991.

=== Federal judicial service ===
President George H. W. Bush nominated Graham to the United States District Court for the Southern District of Florida on June 17, 1991, to the seat vacated by Judge Sidney Aronovitz. On September 12, 1991, he was confirmed by the Senate. He received his commission on September 16, 1991. He assumed senior status on December 15, 2013.

== See also ==
- List of African-American federal judges
- List of African-American jurists

Legal offices
Preceded by Sidney Aronovitz	Judge of the United States District Court for the Southern District of Florida; 1991–2013	Succeeded by Beth Bloom
