= Carl F. Kraenzel =

American sociologist

Carl Frederick Kraenzel
- Born: November 1, 1906; Hebron, North Dakota
- Died: July 26, 1980 (aged 73); Las Cruces, New Mexico, United States
- Education: University of North Dakota; University of Wisconsin
- Known for: Work on Rural sociology, Great Plains sociology
- Scientific career
- Fields: Rural sociology, Natural resource sociology
- Workplaces: Montana State University; University of Texas at El Paso

Carl Frederick Kraenzel (November 1, 1906 – July 26, 1980) was an American sociologist. Most of Kraenzel's work focuses on the people of the Great Plains, covering a range of topics including quality of life, power relations, resource use, and mental health. Kraenzel has been widely published in a variety of professional journals, monographs, research bulletins, special reports, and books in the fields of rural sociology, Great Plains sociology, and natural resource sociology. His best known work, The Great Plains in Transition, describes the challenges of social life and connections to the natural environments in the North American semiarid region located between the 98th meridian and the Rocky Mountains. While Kraenzel may not have been a historian, The Great Plains in Transition has greatly influenced the study of Great Plains history.

== Biography ==
Born in Hebron, North Dakota, Kraenzel grew up on a farm in the countryside of the Northern Great Plains and witnessed first-hand the challenges of rural life and living in the region. Kraenzel attended the University of North Dakota for his undergraduate degree, and continued on to do graduate work at the University of Minnesota, Harvard University, and the University of Wisconsin, where he received his Ph.D. in 1935. While at the University of Wisconsin, Kraenzel conducted research under Dr. E. L. Kirkpatrick on a study of relief in relation to rural rehabilitation in the Great Lakes states area of Michigan, Wisconsin and Minnesota. Upon completion of the study, Kraenzel returned to Wisconsin to act as Coordinator between the Wisconsin Emergency Relief Administration and the Wisconsin College of Agriculture. Kraenzel served as a professor of sociology at Montana State University in Bozeman from 1935 to 1968, and later at the University of Texas at El Paso, from 1968 to 1973. Carl F. Kraenzel died on July 16, 1980, in Las Cruces, New Mexico.

== Writings ==
=== Major works ===
- The Great Plains in Transition. University of Oklahoma Press, 1955.
- The Social Cost of Space in the Yonland. Endowment and Research Foundation at Montana State University, 1980.

=== Works in association with other authors ===
- The Northern Plains in a World of Change: A Study Outline for Adult Groups in the Northern Plains of Canada and the United States. Gregory-Cartwright, 1942.
- Montana's Population Changes, 1920 to 1950: Especially as to Numbers and Composition. Montana State College, Agricultural Experiment Station, 1956.
- Social Forces in Rural Communities of Sparsely Populated Areas; Findings and Recommendations Growing Out of a Mental Health Study. Montana Agricultural Experiment Station, 1971.

=== Impact on the study of the Great Plains ===
Kraenzel's work has added greatly to the historical discussion of the Great Plains and its influences. Regionalism and cultural adaptation are two of the important elements of Kraenzel's examination of the Great Plains, where the residents of the Great Plains must reside in the region and develop its needed facilities and institutions in order to cooperate with and become equal to the other regions in the United States. While neither of these two terms are unique to Kraenzel and his study alone, they add to the greater discussion.

Kraenzel created his own theory of the study of communities on the Great Plains that focus around two areas: the "sutland" and the "yonland," particularly related to the social and community life of a region. While there is a similarity to the hinterland theory in these terms, Kraenzel insists these terms are separate still as all the plains are hinterland. The "sutland," according to Kraenzel:

"is the more densely settled, often stringlike, area of habitation along the major avenues of transportation. Generally, this area includes the railroads, which are frequently paralleled by the major highways, bus routes, and by the public utilities such as telephone and telegraph lines, gas lines, and power distribution facilities. Here also, are found the larger towns and cities and all that they imply--specialized and enlarged wholesaling and retailing; banking; shipping and processing for livestock and grain; storage; and specialization in hospital and medical-care facilities."

Kraenzel also states that this area includes high school facilities, colleges or universities, larger churches, and governmental agencies, state and federal. While it shares some commonalities with a core or center in the hinterland theory, that is only half correct. It shares some parts of the core, but on a much smaller scale and often in specialized agricultural ways. Kraenzel termed sutland from the term "sutler," which he states, "historically was the supply agent at the army post before the day when the army maintained its own supply services." The "yonland" as defined by Kraenzel is "the area 'out yonder,' out of the sutland; the area without adequate services." They are the smaller areas dispersed among the sutland areas. There is also an "in-between" area defined by Kraenzel as being smaller towns without the major transportation systems and public services of the sutland and a difficulty in finding a sustainable population to maintain smaller services and facilities.

Kraenzel's theory of the sutland and yonland is significant because of the role of interdependence it creates. The yonland is dependent upon the sutland for services and the sutland is dependent upon the yonland for materials and resources. The sutland and yonland also produce a social organization trend for the Great Plains of four areas, divided among the two areas:

- Yonland
  - Open country
  - The village as a service station
- Sutland
  - The town
  - The city

There is a push-pull factor related to the hinterlands of the Great Plains and the core of large cities on the edge of the Great Plains as well as throughout the country. Kraenzel's examination of the push-pull factor applies to his sutland and yonland theory because of the population fluctuations that emerge, shifting the communities in the sutland. Higher education is a popular example of the pull-factor, where due to the larger colleges and universities being located on the far edges of the plains or outside the region all together. Shopping, entertainment, sports, and cultural events are further example of the push-pull factor as it applies to the sutland/yonland theory because they draw residents of the Great Plains to other cities to take part in what their own communities are too small to support.

In regional studies of the Great Plains, concepts such as regionalism and the relationship between settled farming areas (sutland) and undeveloped hinterlands (yonland) remain central to analyzing local community structures and social life.
