= Beth Bloom =

American judge (born 1962)

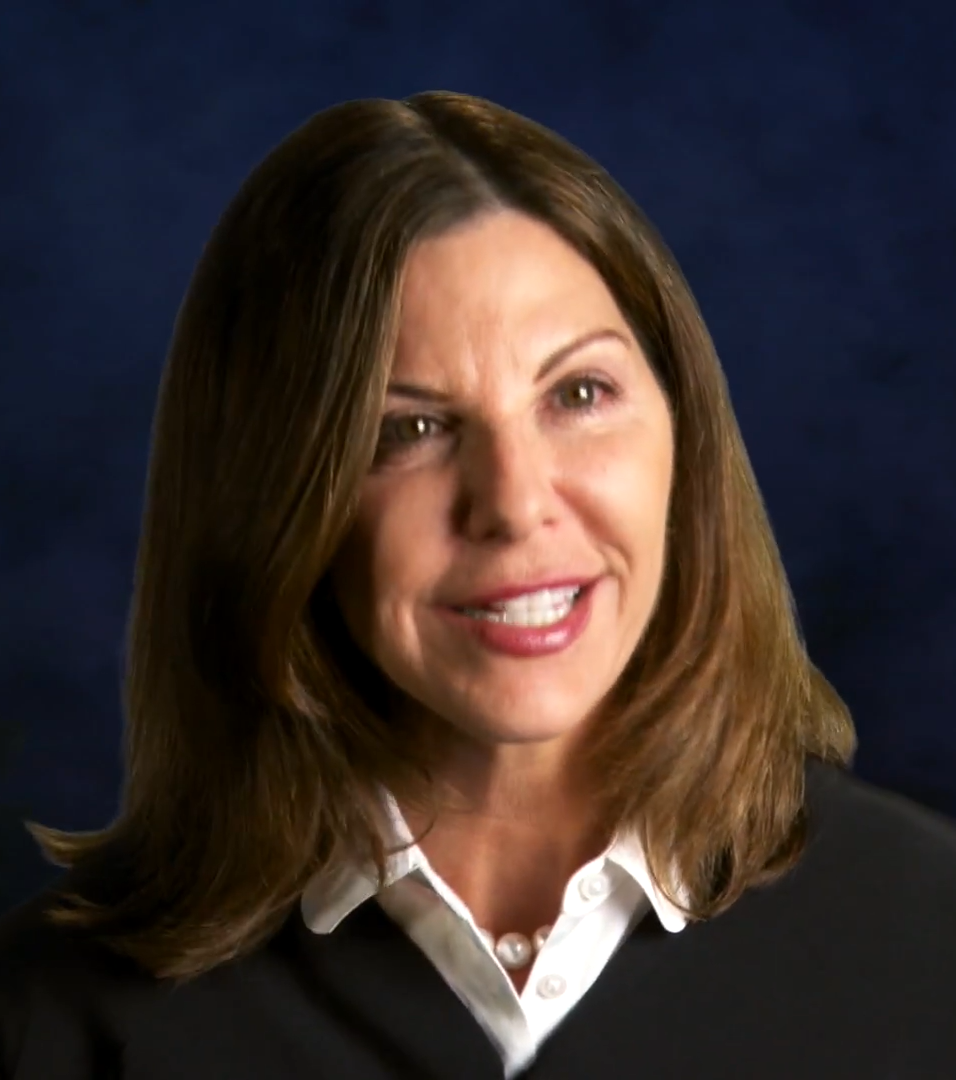

Judge of the United States District Court for the Southern District of Florida
- Incumbent
- Assumed office June 25, 2014
- Appointed by: Barack Obama
- Preceded by: Donald L. Graham

Judge for the Miami-Dade Circuit Court of the Eleventh Judicial Circuit of Florida
- In office 2010–2014

Judge for the Miami-Dade County Court of the Eleventh Judicial Circuit of Florida
- In office 1995–2010

Personal details
- Born: Beth Francine Bloom; 1962 (age 63–64) The Bronx, New York, U.S.
- Spouse: Lyle Stern
- Education: Broward College (AA); University of Florida (BS); University of Miami (JD)

Beth Francine Bloom (born 1962) is a United States district judge of the United States District Court for the Southern District of Florida and former Florida circuit court judge.

== Biography ==
Bloom received an Associate of Arts degree in 1982 from Broward Community College. She received a Bachelor of Science degree in 1984 from the University of Florida. She received a Juris Doctor in 1988 from the University of Miami School of Law. From 1988 to 1995, she served at the law firm of Floyd, Pearson, Richman, Greer, Weil, Brumbaugh & Russomanno, P.A., where she handled a broad range of civil litigation. From 1992 to 1993, she served as a traffic magistrate judge concurrently with her private practice. From 1995 to 2010, she was a county judge in Miami-Dade County within the Eleventh Judicial Circuit and served as an associate administrative judge of the Criminal Division in 2010. From 2010 to 2014, she served as an appellate judge in the Eleventh Judicial Circuit.

=== Federal judicial service ===
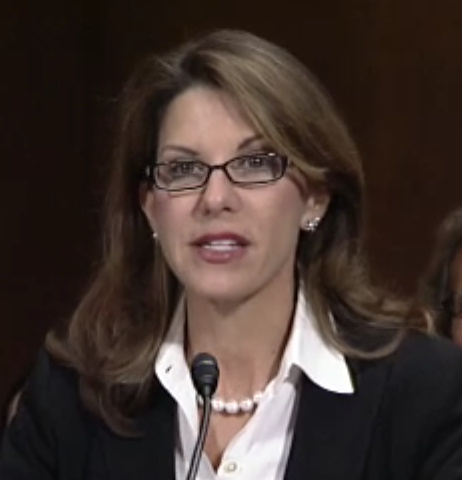

On February 6, 2014, President Barack Obama nominated Bloom to serve as a United States district judge of the United States District Court for the Southern District of Florida, to the seat vacated by Judge Donald L. Graham, who assumed senior status on December 15, 2013. She received a hearing before the United States Senate Judiciary Committee on April 1, 2014. On May 8, 2014, her nomination was reported out of committee by voice vote. On June 19, 2014, Senate Majority Leader Harry Reid filed a motion to invoke cloture on the nomination. On June 23, 2014, the United States Senate invoked cloture on her nomination by a 53–31 vote. On June 24, 2014, she was confirmed by a 95–0 vote. She received her judicial commission on June 25, 2014.

== See also ==
- List of Jewish American jurists

Legal offices
Preceded by Donald L. Graham	Judge of the United States District Court for the Southern District of Florida; 2014–present	Incumbent
