= M. Aloysius Peach =

American nun and poet

Mother Mary Aloysius Peach, O.S.U. (December 5, 1892 – July 7, 1980) was an Ursuline nun and the eighth poet laureate of Delaware.

She was born Lucy Peach, the second of nine children of a Woodstock, Maryland stonemason. Her mother was organist for St. Alphonsus Church in Woodstock for 69 years. Peach's childhood interest in poetry was encouraged by the Jesuits at nearby Woodstock College.

At the age of 19, she entered the Ursuline Order in 1913.

She published three books of poetry: Divine Paratrooper (1952), Divine Lapidary (1961), and One Fold, One Shepherd (1962).
