= Rostislav Petera =

Rostislav Petera (15 September 1909 – 21 July 1980) was a Czechoslovak catholic politician. Petera was a member of the catholic Czechoslovak People's Party. From 1969 to 1971 and from 1976 to 1980 he was a member of the Federal Assembly of Czechoslovakia. In 1970 he became the general secretary of the Czechoslovak People's Party and in 1973 Petera was elected - as the successor of Antonín Pospíšil - the chairman of the party. He continued with the pro-Communist course. From 1973 to 1980 he was minister without portfolio in the Czechoslovak government.

== See also ==
- Christian and Democratic Union – Czechoslovak People's Party
