= Hinterland (disambiguation) =

Hinterland is a non-urban area under urban influence.

Hinterland or Hinterlands may also refer to:

== Film and television ==
- Hinterland (1998 film), a film by Jacques Nolot
- Hinterland (2015 film), a British film
- Hinterland (2021 film), a German-language film directed by Stefan Ruzowitzky
- Hinterland (TV series), a BBC TV police drama series set in Wales
- Hinterland Who's Who, a series of 60-second public service announcements profiling Canadian animals

== Music ==
- Hinterland (band), a Canadian band, active 2002-2008
- Hinterland, an Irish two-man band, active 1989-1992; see Gerry Leonard § Hinterland
- Hinterland, a 1995 album by William Orbit under the Strange Cargo project
- Hinterland (Aim album), 2002, or the title song
- Hinterland, a 2006 album by Canadian singer-songwriter Old Man Luedecke
- Hinterland, a 2008 album by Belgian band Mint
- Hinterland, a 2013 album by German rapper Casper
- Hinterland (Lonelady album), 2015

== Other uses ==
- "Hinterlands" (short story), a 1981 science fiction short story by William Gibson
- Hinterland (video game), a 2008 high fantasy role-playing video game by Tilted Mill
- Hinterland, Switzerland, a district of the Canton of Appenzell Ausserrhoden, Switzerland
- Hinterland Music Festival, St. Charles, Iowa
- Hinterland, a 2012 novel by Caroline Brothers
- Hinterland Bar and Food Carts, Portland, Oregon, U.S.
- Hinterland Studios, a Canadian game studio known for The Long Dark
- Godslayer Book Two: Hinterland, a 2006 novel by James Rollins
