= Doors of the Roman Pantheon =

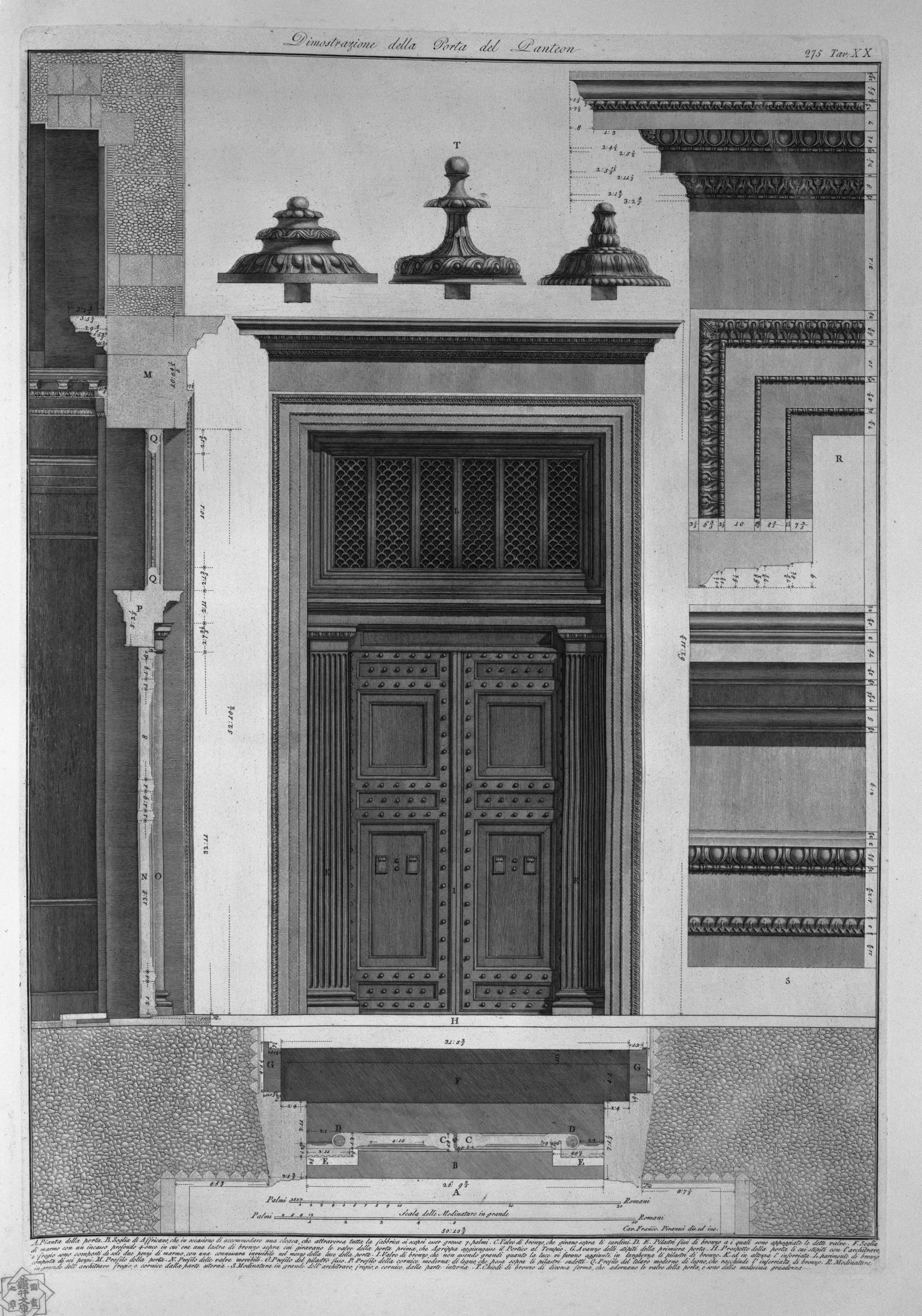
- Engraving by Francesco Piranesi, 1780
- Interactive map of Doors of the Roman Pantheon
- Location: Rome, Italy
- Material: Bronze
- Width: 4.45 metres (14.6 ft)
- Height: 7.53 metres (24.7 ft)

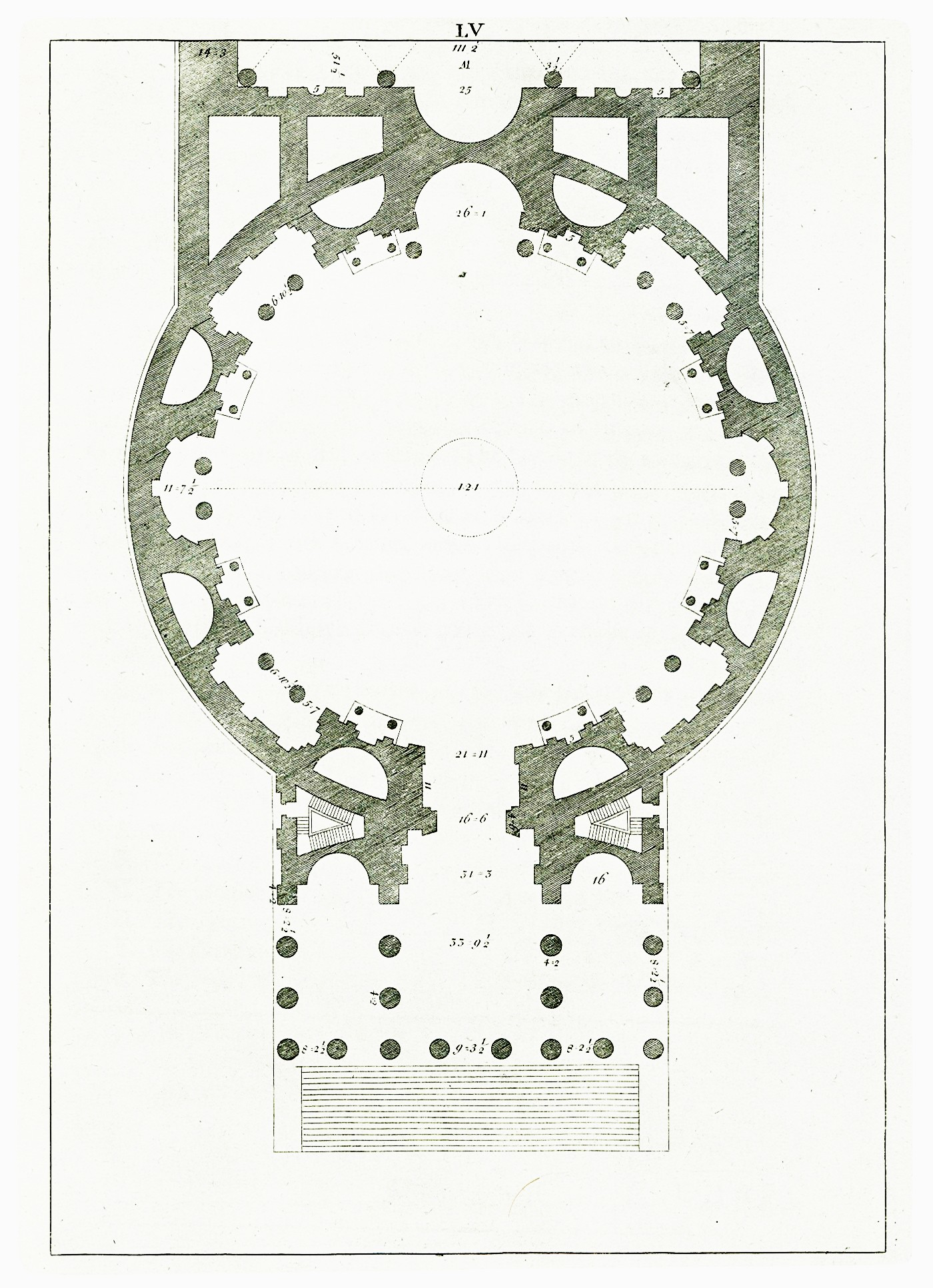
According to a plan by Giacomo Leoni, the width of the doorway is 4.8 metres (16 ft)

The Doors of the Roman Pantheon are the main entrance bronze doors to the rotunda of the Roman Pantheon.

As a monument of applied arts, the exact date of their creation has remained open to speculation for centuries, with scholars attempting to determine the age of the doors and whether they are contemporaneous with the Pantheon.

== Description ==
The doors, measuring 4.45 metres (14.6 ft) wide and 7.53 metres (24.7 ft) high, consist of two leaves. The panels and lintels of the doors are made of cast bronze. Each leaf pivots on pins installed in the floor at the bottom and in the architrave at the top. The doors, in form and detail, resemble the ancient bronze doors of Rome, such as those in the Temple of Romulus and the Curia Julia.

Bronze pilasters with fluting, surmounted by Tuscan capitals, flank both sides of the doors. These capitals are adorned with egg-and-dart motifs of the Ionic order—bronze casting in the form of egg-shaped ornaments and arrowheads. The pilasters are connected by an entablature composed of a concise frieze. Above the doors, on a wooden frame, sits a transom—six identical rectangular vertical bronze lattice panels with a simple and fairly common ancient pattern. This structure is part of the building's ventilation system, allowing air to flow inside even when the doors are closed.

== History ==
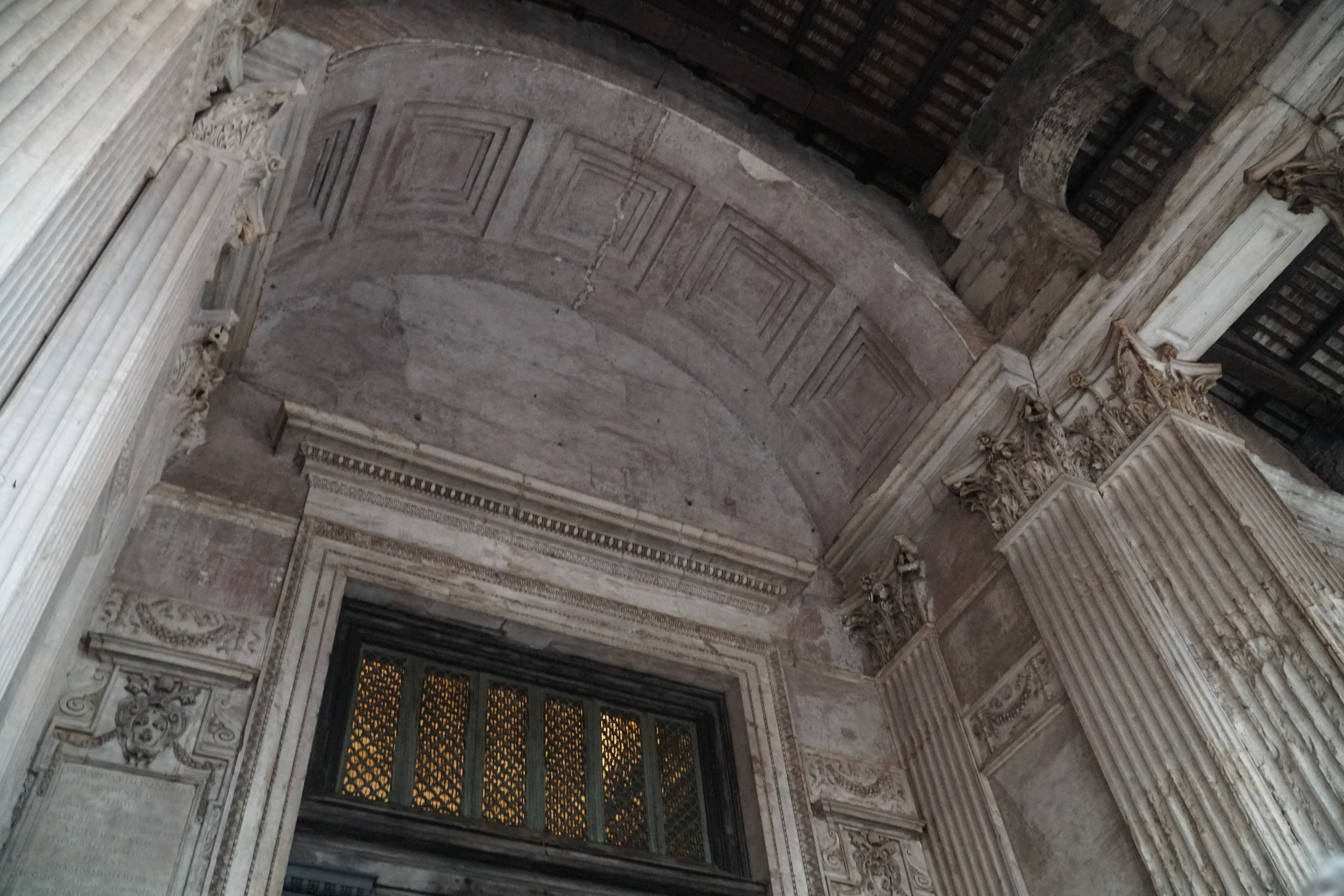
Upper part of the doors, featuring a bronze ventilation grille

It is uncertain whether these doors are contemporaneous with the Pantheon, with opinions both for and against. Some researchers of the Pantheon believed these doors to be genuinely ancient, not stolen by conquerors, Eastern Emperors (with Constans II exporting bronze), or medieval Popes. Johann Joachim Winckelmann was also confident in the ancient age of the doors, as he stated in his work Storia dell’arte nell’antichità. Doubts have been expressed about the ancient age of the doors, with the noted disproportion of the doors to comply with the prescriptions of Vitruvius suggesting their manufacture in the Modern Age. There have been suggestions that the original doors were looted during the Sack of Rome by King Gaiseric of the Vandals in the 5th century, as the Vandals' booty included copper stripped from the roof of the Temple of Jupiter, as mentioned by Procopius of Caesarea.

There is also a version suggesting that the doors only partially contain ancient elements, with some elements unquestionably more recent. There is evidence that during restoration work on the Pantheon in 1759, the doors were repaired because they were damaged due to a fall during an attempt to remove them two years earlier, resulting in the death of the unfortunate master mason Corsini.

Researchers doubt that the wooden beam frame, to which the bronze parts of the doors are attached, could be of ancient age and lean towards the belief that the doors underwent substantial reconstruction in the Middle Ages or during the time of Pope Urban VIII.

The right door remained completely blocked and the left one opened only partially for 241 years. After careful examination in 1998, the doors were slightly raised using specially made plates coated with a layer of soap. The pins were replaced, making the doors fully functional again.

== Gallery ==
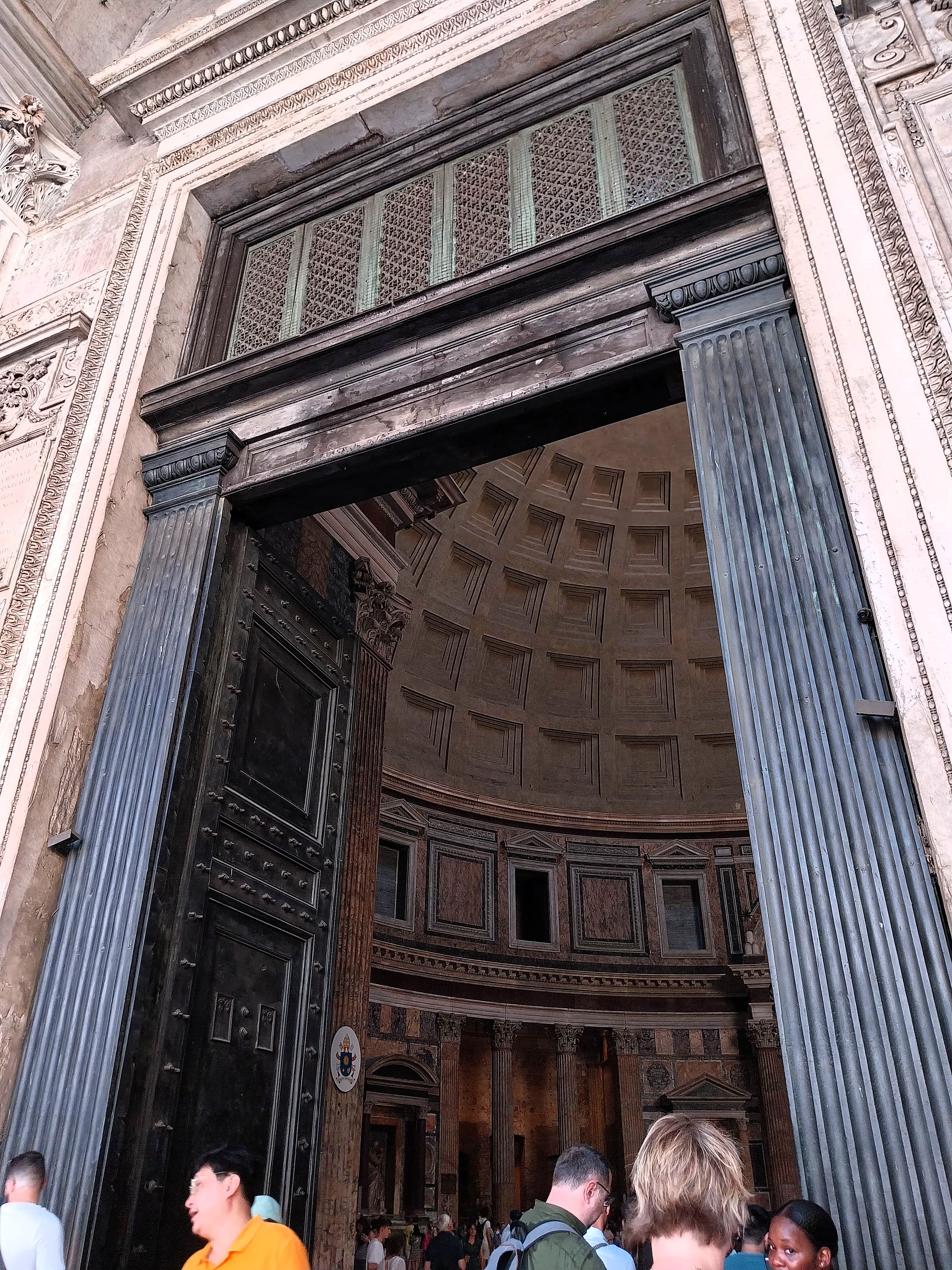
View from the exterior

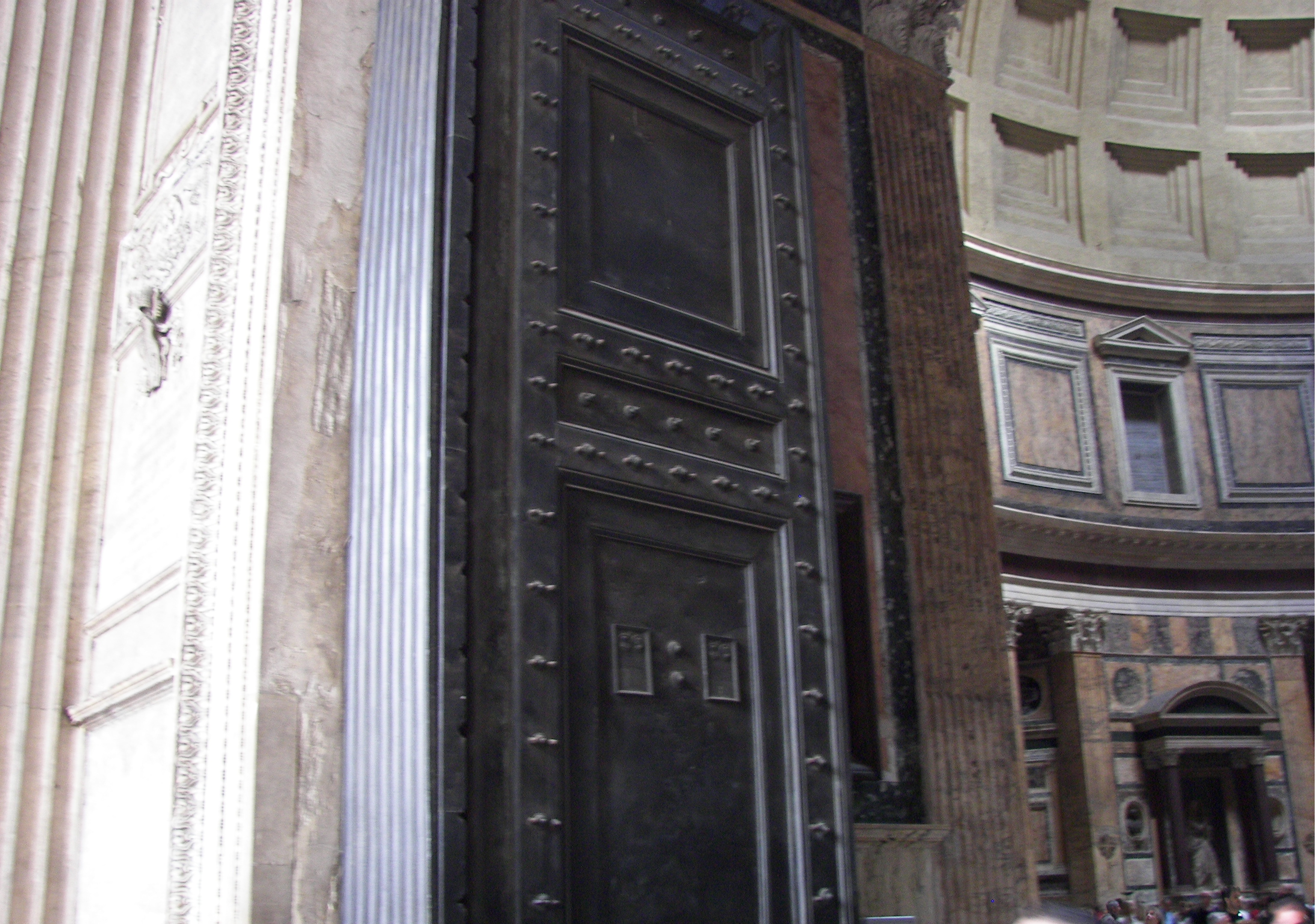
Closeup from the exterior

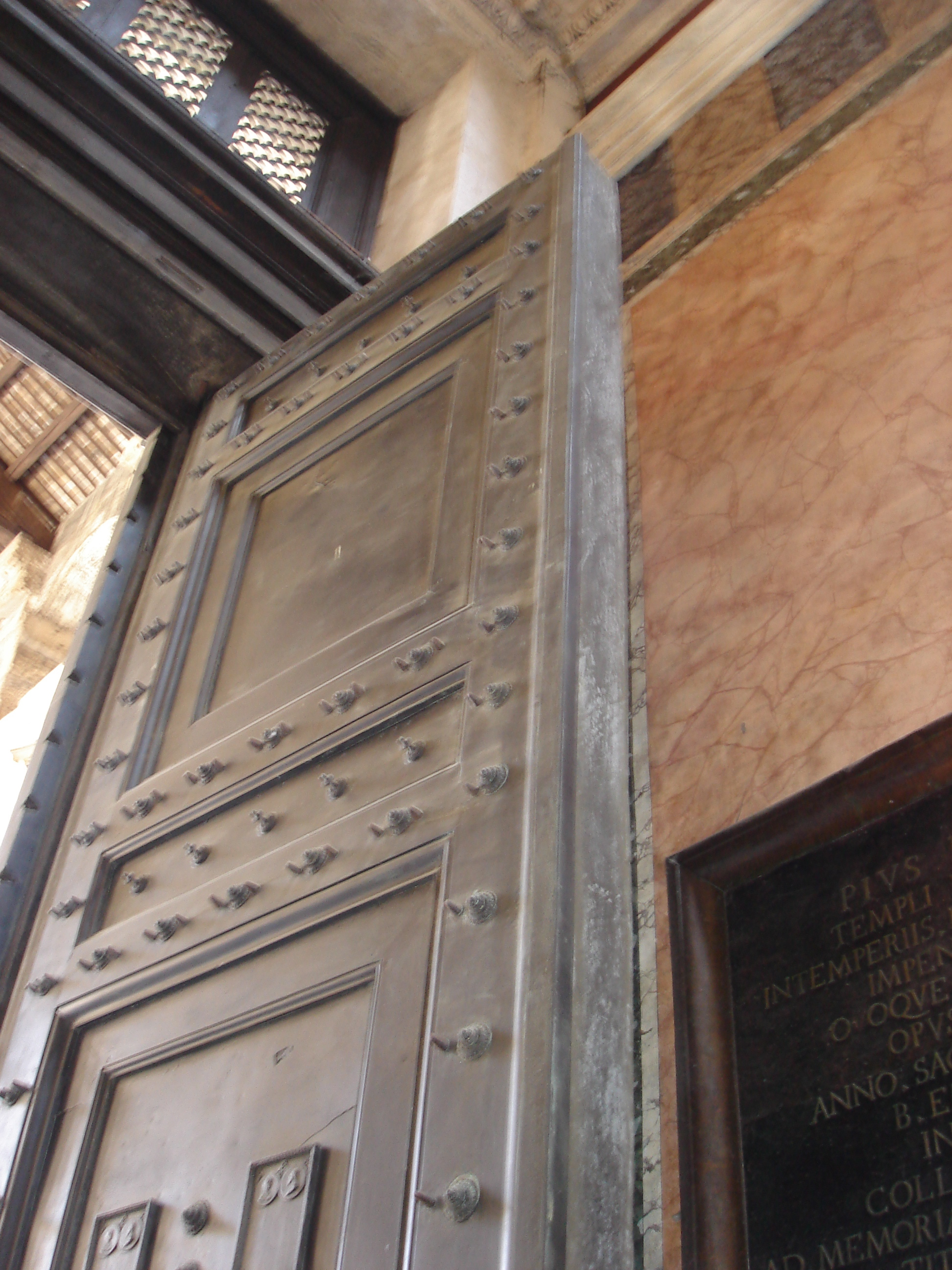
Closeup from the interior

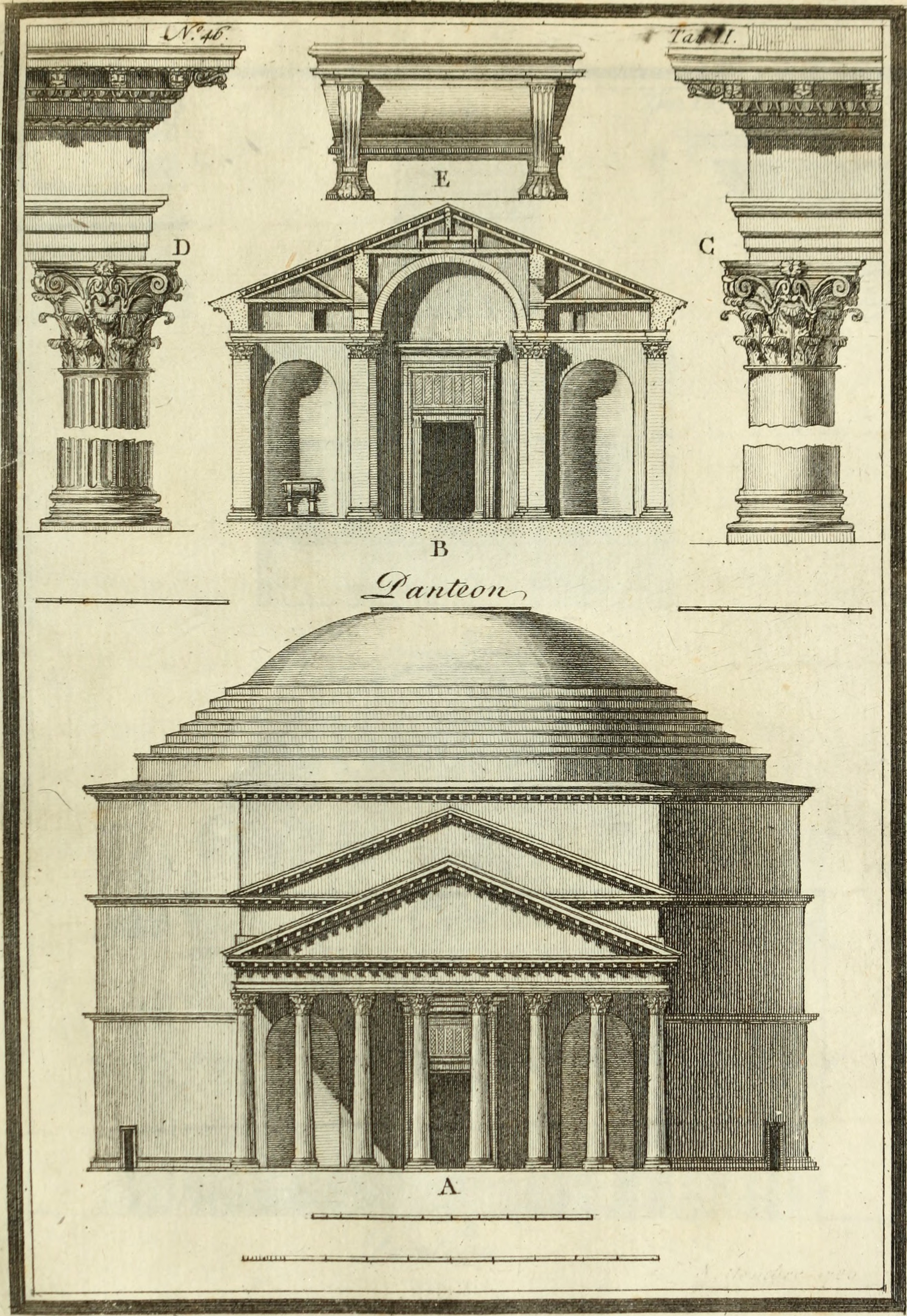
Position of the doorway on the facade. Engraving from the book by Giuseppe Antonio Guattani, 1805

== Literature ==
- Donaldson, Thomas (1833). A Collection of the Most Approved Examples of Door-ways: From Ancient Buildings in Greece and Italy, Expressly Measured and Delineated for this Work, Preceded by an Essay on the Usages of the Ancients Respecting Door-ways; a New Translation of the Chapter of Vitruvius on the Subject, with the Original Text Taken from an Ancient and Valuable M.s. in the British Museum; and Copious Descriptions of the Plates. Great Britain: Bossange, Barthès and Lowell. pp. 41–43. ISBN 9780267640829.
- Middleton, John Henry (1885). Ancient Rome in 1885. Great Britain: A. & C. Black. p. 343. ISBN 9781358147654.
