= Ruth Tappe Scruggs =

American clubwoman

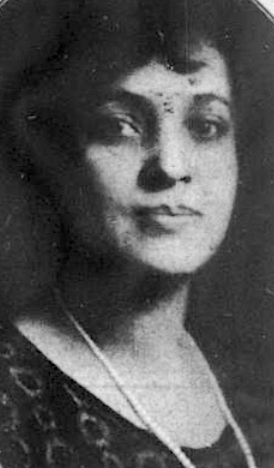
- Ruth Tappe Scruggs, from a 1927 issue of The Crisis
- Born: Ruth Eliza Tappe; August 4, 1893; Washington, D.C., United States
- Died: July 2, 1980 (aged 86); Detroit, Michigan, United States
- Known for: National president of Zeta Phi Beta (1926–1930)

Ruth Eliza Tappe Scruggs (August 4, 1893 – July 2, 1980) was an American clubwoman. She was the sixth national president (Grand Basileus) of the Zeta Phi Beta sorority, in office from 1926 to 1930.

== Early life and education ==
Ruth E. Tappe was born in Washington, D.C., the daughter of James Henry Tappe and Mary Susan Monroe Tappe. She earned a bachelor's degree in education from Howard University in 1919.

== Career ==
Tappe worked at the Government Printing Office in Washington as a young woman. Scruggs was the sixth national president of Zeta Phi Beta, serving in that leadership role from 1926 to 1930. During her tenure, the sorority joined the National Pan-Hellenic Conference, and its official national magazine, The Archon, began publication.

Besides Zeta Phi Beta, Scruggs was active in church work. In 1950, she helped found the Niagara-Buffalo chapter of The Links, another Black women's service organization.

== Personal life ==
Ruth Tappe married physician and community leader Ivorite Lorimer Scruggs in 1920. They moved to Buffalo, New York in 1921, where they were socially prominent, and owned an apartment building. Her husband died in 1974, and she died in 1980, in her late eighties, in Detroit, Michigan.
