= Knud Blak Jensen =

Danish footballer (1925-1980)

Personal information
- Date of birth: 10 August 1925
- Date of death: 22 July 1980 (aged 54)
- Position: Defender

Senior career*
Years	Team	Apps	(Gls)
- KB
- * Club domestic league appearances and goals

Knud Blak Jensen (10 August 1925 – 22 July 1980) was a Danish footballer. He was part of Denmark's squad at the 1952 Summer Olympics, but he did not play in any matches.
