= Peeter Matsov =

Estonian boxer

Peeter Matsov (7 August 1905 – 31 July 1980) was an Estonian boxer and sports figure.

He was born in Tallinn.

He started his sporting exercising in 1921 at the sport club "Sport". He was one of the founders of Tallinn Boxing Club, and sport club "Gong". He was Estonian boxing judge and representative at 1936 Summer Olympics in Berlin.

1959–1965 he was the chairman of Estonian Boxing Association.

In 1971 he was named as Merited Coach of Estonian SSR.
