= Carmen Tessier =

French journalist and gossip columnist

- Born: Carmen Clotilde Julienne Tessier; 24 June 1911; Allaines-Mervilliers
- Died: 31 July 1980 (aged 69); Neuilly-sur-Seine
- Spouse(s): André-Louis Dubois

Carmen Tessier (24 June 1911 – 31 July 1980) was a French journalist and gossip columnist.

== Biography ==
Carmen Tessier was born in Allaines (Eure-et-Loir). She was secretary to Maurice Bourdet at the Le Poste Parisien in 1937, and then joined Paris-Soir. After the Second World War and the Liberation, she was refused a press card because she worked for that newspaper during German occupation. She recalled: "Thanks to the intervention of Pierre Lazareff [(the director of France-Soir)], I was able to appear again before the committee that decided on the granting of the card. The presiding magistrate asked me loudly: 'So, madam, what did you do during the war?' 'Mr. President, you know it as well as I do: I reported on the cases you tried'. It was all over. As a consequence, I have press card No. 750."

As a journalist at France-Soir, Tessier became a household name. She wrote about rumours surrounding celebrities and stars in column "Les Potins de la commère" ("neighbourhood busybody") that was widely read in France, reputedly by both ministers and concierges. She modelled herself on the American journalist Elsa Maxwell, whom Lazareff had admired when he lived in the United States. Though her writing was ironic and at times caustic, she steered clear of outright scandal. From these revelations she published several books, including the collections of her mémoires, the Bibliothèque Rosse, Histoires de Marie-Chantal and La Commère en dit plus. Olivia de Havilland remarked that her "power and prestige as a lady journalist [were] unequalled in all of Europe"

In 1956, when Romain Gary won the Prix Goncourt for Les Racines du ciel, columnist Tessier suggested that because the writer was from Lithuania, he thus had a poor command of French, so Albert Camus and Jacques Lemarchand must have written his book for him. Albert Camus then shot off a letter to Charles Gombault, co-director of France-Soir, who said, after reading the missive: "Ok, we will only talk about Camus in this newspaper to announce his death".

Philippe Bouvard succeeded her in writing the gossip column of France-Soir in 1973. She retired in 1975.

== Private life ==
In 1961 she married André-Louis Dubois, prefect of Paris and later the director of Paris Match. This opened doors for Tessier across Paris, and expanded her network of friends and informants. Since Dubois was known as the police chief who had prohibited the honking of car horns for which Paris was notorious, Jean Cocteau quipped "Le Préfet du Silence épouse la Commère" ("the Prefect of Silence marries the Gossip").

Retirement brought the opportunity to write her books, but she missed her accustomed crowded life of invitations and phone calls, and suffered severe depression. She died by suicide in 1980, jumping from the balcony of the 9th floor of a seniors' residence in Neuilly-sur-Seine, west of Paris, where she lived with her husband.

== Honours ==
- Knight of the Legion of Honour

== Bibliography ==
- Tessier, Carmen (1953). Bibliothèque rosse. Gallimard, Paris
- Tessier, C. (1955). Histoires de Marie-Chantal: Et de beaucoup d'autres. Paris: Gallimard.
- Tessier, C. (1958). Le Bottin de la Commère: Pour bien manger à Paris. [4e édition.]. Paris: Gallimard.
- Tessier, Carmen (1975). La commère en dit plus. Stock, Paris
