= Howard Montgomery =

American football and basketball player and coach (1916–1980)

Biographical details
- Born: January 15, 1916; Temple, Texas, U.S.
- Died: July 30, 1980 (aged 64)

Playing career

Football
- 1936–1937: Arkansas State Teachers

Coaching career (HC unless noted)

Football
- 1941–1946: Arkansas HS (AR)
- 1947–1951: Arkansas State Teachers

Basketball
- 1948–1949: Arkansas State Teachers

Head coaching record
- Overall: 26–17–5 (college football); 14–11 (college basketball); 30–24–3 (high school football)
- Bowls: 0–1

Howard R. "Pee Wee" Montgomery (January 5, 1916 – July 30, 1980) was an American football and basketball player and coach. He served as the head football coach at Arkansas State Teachers College—now known as the University of Central Arkansas—in Conway, Arkansas from 1947 to 1951, compiling a record of 26–17–5. Montgomery was also the head basketball coach at Arkansas State Teachers for one season, in 1948–49, tallying a mark of 14–11.

== Head coaching record ==
=== College football ===
Year	Team	Overall	Conference	Standing	Bowl/playoffs
Arkansas State Teachers Bears (Arkansas Intercollegiate Conference) (1947–1951)
1947	Arkansas State Teachers	8–1–1			L Kickapoo Bowl
1948	Arkansas State Teachers	5–3–1			
1949	Arkansas State Teachers	3–5–2			
1950	Arkansas State Teachers	7–2–1			
1951	Arkansas State Teachers	3–6			
Arkansas State Teachers:		26–17–5			
Total:		26–17–5			

=== High school football ===
Year	Team	Overall	Conference	Standing	Bowl/playoffs
Arkansas High School Razorbacks () (1941–1946)
1941	Arkansas	1–6			
1942	Arkansas	4–6			
1943	Arkansas	6–2			
1944	Arkansas	6–5			
1945	Arkansas	7–2–1			
1946	Arkansas	7–3–2			
Arkansas:		30–24–3			
Total:		30–24–3			
