= Elias Pereira =

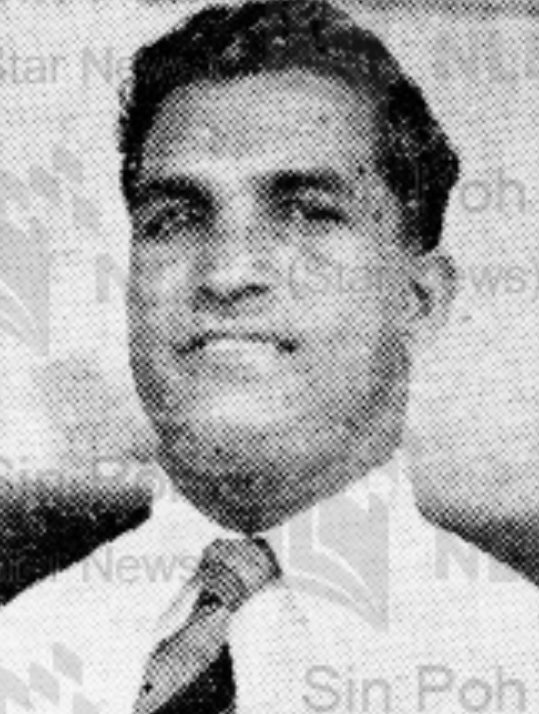
Pereira in 1951

Elias Philips Pereira (1916 – 2 July 1980) was a prominent educator and educationist in Singapore. He was the founder and director of the Stamford College in Singapore, as well as the founder of the CYMA School of Commerce and the president of the Singapore Indian Association. A vocal proponent of correspondence education, he also served as the vice-president of the International Council for Correspondence Education.

== Early life and education ==
Pereira was born in Kerala, India in 1916. He later moved to Colombo, Sri Lanka. However, due to financial difficulties, Pereira decided not to pursue higher education, instead choosing to work in an export firm. He served with the British Indian Army in the Burma campaign. Pereira later studied at the University of London, where he received his Bachelor of Commerce degree in 1950 and his Bachelor of Science in economics (Honours) in 1952. He received his degree in accountancy from the University of Queensland in 1955.

== Career ==
In 1947, he came to Singapore, where he was employed as a statistical clerk at the Department of Civil Aviation. After he was employed, he began purchasing books and reading to educate himself. This was followed by correspondence classes, which he believed aided in providing "greater regularity and planning" for achieving goals. While working for the Department of Civil Aviation, he became the first Malayan to be made a member of the Incorporated Association of Statisticians in London. He was transferred to a senior appointment in the Electricity Department soon after. He was then made a clerk of cost-accounting for the City Council of Singapore. After graduating from university, Pereira became an accountant at the University of Malaya in Singapore and gave part-time lectures on accountancy at two universities.

Pereira founded the CYMA School of Commerce, which eventually came to be known as the City School of Commerce, in 1950. He served as its principal, running it after his lectures. The school started as a singular classroom he rented along Bras Basah Road with only 10 students. Classroom materials such as a blackboard, desks, chairs and tables were purchased using his savings. The school taught a syllabus which he came up with himself. Pereira was a strong proponent for the provision of government aid and encouragement to youths seeking higher education. In 1956, he left the university to serve as the principal as the school full-time, expanding its curriculum to include arts and sciences subjects. In the same year, he founded his own public accountants firm. He then founded schools of commerce in Penang and Kuala Lumpur and established Stamford College. By 1969, the college had reportedly become the "largest group of commercial training colleges in S.E. Asia". It eventually grew to include campuses in Malaysia and London in addition to Singapore. In the 1950s, he also served as the treasurer of the Singapore Education Society.

The Straits Times reported in January 1964 that Pereira was known as "one of Malaysia's foremost educationists." He attended the 1965 International Conference on Correspondence Education, which was held in Stockholm, Sweden, where he delivered a speech on correspondence education in developing countries. In September of the following year, he delivered a paper on correspondence education in Southeast Asia at a conference of correspondence education jointly organised by the National Home Study Council of the United States and the University of Michigan. At the eighth session of the International Council for Correspondence Education, which was held at the UNESCO Headquarters in Paris in 1969, he was elected the council's vice-president. He was the first Malayan to hold this position. Pereira had established the Stamford Centre for Executive and Commercial Training just prior to the session.

Pereira was also a prominent member of the Rotary Club of Singapore and served as the Singapore representative to several foreign seminars and conferences on education. From 1968 to 1970, he served as the president of the Singapore Indian Association. From the late 1960s to the 1970s, he served as the president of the Singapore Association of the Chartered Institute of Secretaries. He had previously sat on the organisation's committee. In September 1979, the London Chamber of Commerce & Industry (LCCI) presented Pereira with its Gold Medallion Award for his "long and outstanding, services to business education in association with the examinations of the LCCI."

== Personal life and death ==
Pereira was married to Mary Jer Pereira. They lived on 32 Bin Tong Park. In 1974, they found out from their daughter that their son, Eric, had already married prior to completing his studies and that his wife was already eight to nine months pregnant. According Mary, they were "angry and disappointed" at Eric for choosing not to disclose the fact that he was marrying them and that he did not get married in a church. However, she also claimed that Elias eventually warmed up to Eric's wife, who "became a favourite" of his. However, Mary Jer and an accomplice would later be charged with conspiring to attack Eric's wife with acid in 1981, the year following Elias's death. She claimed to have been acting on the belief Eric's wife was to blame for a rift in the family. However, a judge decided in November that there was insufficient evidence to convict Mary Jer.

According to colleague Lawrence Thomas, Pereira's "entire life was focused on education, even at the expense of neglecting his family." Prominent businessman and philanthropist Ee Peng Liang was a friend of his. He was supportive of the increase of women finding employment as secretaries as he believed it was "making use of women power" and "helping alleviate the labour problem." In 1980, Pereira left for the United States, where he received a heart surgery which proved unsuccessful. He died in California on 2 July 1980. The funeral was held on 6 July at the Cathedral of the Good Shepherd, after which his body was buried at the Choa Chu Kang Cemetery. Winston Pereira, founder of the Olympia College in Malaysia, was a nephew of his. In July 2014, a book on Pereira, written by Thomas and titled Remembering Elias Pereira, An Education Icon, was launched.
