= Katrina Zepps =

Australian nurse (1918 – 1980)

Katrina Zepps MBE (15 November 1918 – 8 July 1980) was an Australian nurse (general), nurse educator and refugee. She was born in Hlukhiv (then part of the Russian Empire now of Ukraine) and died in Turramurra, Sydney, New South Wales, Australia.

She trained at the Red Cross Hospital in Jelgava, Latvia. Her Australian naturalisation papers were cleared while she was working in Tully, Queensland.

In 1967, she was appointed acting administrator of the New South Wales College of Nursing.

In 1977, she received an Australian MBE for her services to nursing.

== Early years ==
Katrina Zepps was born on 15 November 1918 at Glukhov, Ukraine. She was the daughter of Alexander and Praskovia Chalders, Latvian refugees from WWI. The family returned to Latvia in 1922, where her father became prison governor at Jelgava.

== Education and career ==
Katrina qualified in general nursing and midwifery at the Red Cross hospital, Jelgava Latvia in 1943. She worked as a charge sister (1945–46) at the displaced persons' hospital at Lübeck, Germany. She migrated to Melbourne, Australia with her husband in 1948. She worked as a registered nurse, mainly at Tully District Hospital, Queensland between 1951 and 1960. After moving to Sydney, she worked at Royal Prince Alfred Hospital (RPAH) from 1961. At RPAH, she was worked as an educator at the nurses training school. She eventually became the executive director of the college of nursing, which eventually moved to the New South Wales College of Paramedical Studies. She retired from the NSW College of Nursing in 1976 but served as its president between 1979 and 1980.
