= William O. Mehrtens =

American judge

Senior Judge of the United States District Court for the Southern District of Florida
- In office September 15, 1975 – July 16, 1980

Judge of the United States District Court for the Southern District of Florida
- In office September 1, 1965 – September 15, 1975
- Appointed by: Lyndon B. Johnson
- Preceded by: Emett Clay Choate
- Succeeded by: Sidney Aronovitz

Personal details
- Born: William Osborne Mehrtens; January 24, 1905 Savannah, Georgia, U.S.
- Died: July 16, 1980 (aged 75)
- Education: Fredric G. Levin College of Law (LL.B.)

William Osborne Mehrtens (January 24, 1905 – July 16, 1980) was a United States district judge of the United States District Court for the Southern District of Florida.

== Education and career ==
Born on January 24, 1905, in Savannah, Georgia, Mehrtens received his Bachelor of Laws from the Fredric G. Levin College of Law at the University of Florida in 1932. He was in private practice in Miami, Florida from 1933 to 1965 and served in the United States Naval Reserve as a lieutenant commander from 1942 to 1945, during World War II.

== Federal judicial service ==
President Lyndon B. Johnson nominated Mehrtens to the United States District Court for the Southern District of Florida on August 20, 1965, to a seat vacated by Judge Emmett Clay Choate. He was confirmed by the United States Senate on August 31, 1965, and received his commission the next day. Mehrtens assumed senior status on September 15, 1975, and remained in that status until his death on July 16, 1980.

== Notable decisions ==
=== Treasure Salvors, Inc. v. Unidentified Wrecked & Abandoned Sailing Vessel ===
Judge Mehrtens presided over a case where the State of Florida claimed ownership over the wreck of the Nuestra Señora de Atocha, a Spanish Galleon carrying over $400 Million worth of treasure which had sunk in a hurricane in the 1700s. While the wreck was found by Mel Fisher in international waters, the State of Florida confiscated the treasure claiming that it was found within the state's terrestrial waters. On August 21, 1978, Judge Mehrtens, upon remand from the United States Court of Appeals for the Fifth Circuit, issued an opinion chastising the State of Florida's Division of Archives for using coercive backroom tactics to try and lay claim to treasure it knew it didn't belong to it. Ultimately, Judge Mehrtens granted summary judgment in Mel Fisher's favor, and the case was appealed to the United States Supreme Court, which affirmed the majority of Mehrtens' ruling.

== Sources ==
Legal offices
Preceded by Emett Clay Choate	Judge of the United States District Court for the Southern District of Florida; 1965–1975	Succeeded by Sidney Aronovitz
