= John Towner =

Australian rules footballer

Personal information
- Full name: John William Towner
- Born: 19 November 1933
- Died: 19 January 2023 (aged 89)
- Original team: Ascot Vale
- Height: 183 cm (6 ft 0 in)
- Weight: 75 kg (165 lb)
- Position: Defender

Playing career^{1}
Years	Club	Games (Goals)
1953–1959	Essendon	87 (36)
1960–1962	West Perth	35 (10)
- ^{1} Playing statistics correct to the end of 1962.

Career highlights
- Essendon best clubman: 1957, 1959

John William Towner (19 November 1933 – 19 January 2023) was an Australian rules footballer who played 87 senior games for the Essendon Football Club from 1953 to 1959.

== Career ==
Recruited from the Ascot Vale Football Club, Towner made his debut for Essendon Firsts as a reserve in the second home-and-away round match against South Melbourne at the Lake Oval on 2 May 1953. In his first year, he played 11 senior matches, including the Firsts Semi-Final team that lost 5.11 (41) to Footscray's 6.13 (49).

He played 16 senior games in 1954, a single game in 1955, 10 games in 1956 (plus 1 night game), 16 games in 1957 (plus 1 night game) — he played on the half-back flank in the losing Essendon Grand Final team of 1957 — 16 games in 1958 (plus 2 night games), and 17 games in 1959.

His game at full-back for the Essendon 1959 Grand Final team, which was beaten by Melbourne 17.13 (115) to 11.12 (78), was his last game for Essendon.

Well-liked at Essendon (he was chosen as Best Clubman in 1957 and 1959), he left Essendon due to an employment transfer to Western Australia.

He played at full-back with West Perth for three years (1960–1962).

He later moved to Queensland and was captain-coach of Surfers Paradise Football Club in 1965.

== Forward to back-line ==
In 1953 and 1954 Towner played on the forward line. With a lot of pace across the ground, and strong in the air, he was tried at full-forward as a replacement for the injured John Coleman in 1954; however, once at full-forward, he demonstrated that he was not a very accurate kick (he kicked 23 goals in 9 matches).

Once he was switched to defence, he was highly successful, initially on the half-back flank and, later in his career at Essendon, as the team's regular full-back.

As a full-back, much of his game was centred on his ability to judge and understand the manner in which his full-forward opponent went for the ball; and much of his value to Essendon was his ability to consistently punch the ball out of the hands of a full-forward attempting to mark over his head.

Towner regularly held South Melbourne’s Fred Goldsmith, a Brownlow Medallist, goalless.
