= Xiang Runkun =

Chinese politician

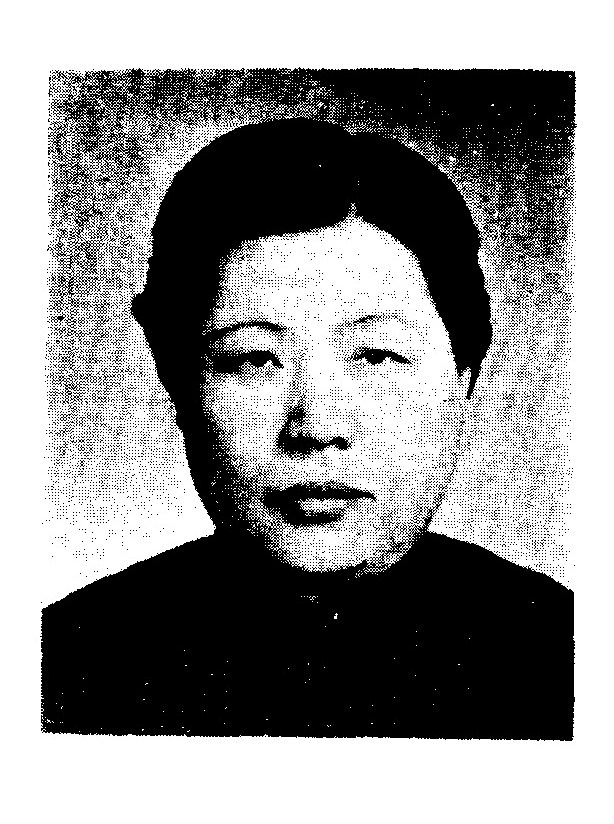

Member of the Legislative Yuan
- In office 1948–1980
- Constituency: Shenyang

Personal details
- Born: 11 October 1906
- Died: 24 July 1980 (aged 73)

Xiang Runkun (Chinese: 項潤崑, 11 October 1906 – 24 July 1980) was a Chinese politician. She was among the first group of women elected to the Legislative Yuan in 1948.

== Biography ==
Originally from Shenyang, Xiang graduated from the Faculty of Law at Chaoyang University. She joined the Kuomintang and became an executive member of the party and chair of the Shenyang Women's Association.

Xiang was a Kuomintang candidate in Shenyang in the 1948 elections for the Legislative Yuan and was elected to parliament. She relocated to Taiwan during the Chinese Civil War and remained a member of the Legislative Yuan until her death in 1980.
