= Prosper Ellis =

Australian golf course architect (1895–1980)

- Born: 14 August 1895; Newtown, New South Wales
- Died: 29 July 1980 (aged 84); Bowral, New South Wales
- Education: Newington College
- Occupations: Surveyor; Golf course architect
- Spouse: Alice Victoria Grace (née Birdsall)
- Parent(s): George and Christina Ellis

Prosper de George Ellis (14 August 1895 – 29 July 1980) was an Australian surveyor, golf course architect and amateur scratch golfer whose name is "prominent in golf history in Australia."

== Family and education ==
Ellis was born at Newtown, New South Wales, the second child of George and Christina Ellis. He attended Newington College from 1908 until 1912. Whilst still at school Ellis joined Bonnie Doon Golf Club and at the age of 17 won the L.E. Gannon Trophy, a stroke event.

== Working life ==
After completing high school, Ellis trained as a surveyor and worked for the Department of Railways New South Wales. In 1923, Ellis married Alice Victoria Grace Birdsall (1897–1967) in Sydney. On his retirement from surveying, he became a golf club administrator and was Secretary at Pymble Golf Club and Bonnie Doon Golf Club. He was instrumental in arranging the amalgamation of the Metropolitan Golf Club at Pagewood with the Bonnie Doon Golf Club in 1950. He presented the club with a perpetual trophy for a 4 Ball competition.

== Columnist ==
On its founding in 1949 The Sunday Herald carried a golf column, On The Fareways, by Ellis. The byline described him as "three times Pymble champion ... one of Sydney's oldest "A" grade golfers."

== Golf course designs ==
Ellis was often a remodeller of existing courses but his status as a leading amateur golfer led to major design commissions. He at times remodelled The Australian Golf Club (since totally remodelled throughout the 1970s), Bonnie Doon Golf Club, Pymble Golf Club, Killara Golf Club, Castle Hill Golf Club, North Ryde Golf Club, Liverpool Golf Club (since relocated to a new site), Avondale Golf Club, Blackheath Golf Club, Deniliquin Golf Club, Chatswood Golf Club, Tamworth Golf Club, Merewether Golf Club and Kogarah Golf Club. In the 1960s he did a redesign of the Coolamon Golf Club, introducing new water and substantial planting. His major design commissions include Federal Golf Club (1946), Belmont Golf Club (1952), Windsor Golf Club (1963), Woollahra Golf Club (1960) and Camden Valley Golf Resort (1964). Other designs are Muswellbrook Golf Club's extension by 12 holes (1964), Toronto Golf Links between 1968 and 1982, Nelson Bay Golf & Country Club's second 9 holes (1970) and Mittagong-Highlands Golf Club (1972).

== Death ==
Ellis retired to the Southern Highlands and lived at Wintersloe, Burradoo. He died in Bowral on 29 July 1980, having been predeceased by his wife in 1967. The Prosper Ellis Plate is played for at Bowral Golf Club where Ellis was the club's first Honorary Life Member. Income from his bequest to Newington College is used to support The Sir Percival Halse Rogers Scholarship for all-round achievement.
