= Gerold C. Dunn =

American lawyer

Associate Justice of the California Court of Appeal for the Second Appellate District in Division 4
- In office 1968–1977
- Appointed by: Ronald Reagan

Judge of the Los Angeles County Superior Court
- In office 1967–1968
- Appointed by: Ronald Reagan

Personal details
- Born: July 11, 1911
- Died: July 19, 1980 (aged 69)
- Education: Stanford University
- Occupation: Attorney, judge

Gerold Camarillo Dunn (July 11, 1911 – July 19, 1980) was an American attorney and jurist, who served as an associate justice of the California Court of Appeal for the Second Appellate District in Division 4 from 1968 to 1977 and a Judge of the Los Angeles County Superior Court from 1967 to 1968. Dunn was appointed to both posts by California Governor Ronald Reagan.

Born in Ventura, California, Dunn attended Stanford University, where he earned his Bachelor of Arts (A.B.) degree in 1934. Dunn continued on to Stanford University School of Law, where he earned his Bachelor of Laws (LL.B.) degree in 1938. Dunn was then admitted to the State Bar of California to practice law on November 1, 1938.

Dunn served for a brief period as a special deputy counsel for the County of Los Angeles, California, from 1939 to 1940. After leaving his position with the County of Los Angeles in 1940, Dunn entered private practice in the City of Los Angeles.

During the Second World War, Dunn joined the United States Army, serving from 1942, shortly after the American entry into World War II due to the Japanese attack on Pearl Harbor, Hawaii, until 1945, when the war came to an end.

Dunn returned to private practice after the war and continued until December 11, 1967, when he left his practice as an attorney to accept an appointment as a Judge of the Los Angeles County Superior Court from Republican governor Ronald Reagan.

However, Dunn would serve as a Superior Court Judge for just less than a year, as Governor Reagan quickly appointed him to be an associate justice of the California Court of Appeal for the Second Appellate District in Division 4 on December 2, 1968.

Dunn would serve as an associate justice of the California appellate court for nearly nine years, retiring on October 21, 1977, at the age of 66.
