= Jane Geddes (art historian) =

British art historian and academic

Jane Geddes (born 26 April 1950) is a British art historian and academic, specialising in Scottish architecture, British Medieval manuscripts, Pictish sculpture and Medieval decorative ironwork. She is Emeritus Professor of Art History, University of Aberdeen.

== Education ==
Geddes graduated with a degree in history from University of Cambridge. She earned her PhD from the Courtauld Institute of Art, then a constituent College of the University of London, before working as an Inspector of Ancient Monuments for English Heritage. After this, she became lecturer then senior lecturer in the history of art at University of Aberdeen.

She is currently (August 2020) Emeritus Professor of Art History, University of Aberdeen.

== Awards and recognitions ==
Geddes secured a Leverhulme Research Award to produce two volumes for the Buildings of Scotland series, Aberdeenshire and North-East Scotland, 2008 - 2014.

In 2003, Geddes published the electronic version of the St Albans Psalter, in a project funded with a major grant from the UK Arts and Humanities Research Board (now Arts and Humanities Research Council). Geddes analysed the images and text of the Psalter to argue that the book was made for the medieval anchoress and prioress Christina of Markyate.

Diane Watt said of the St Albans Psalter project that ‘This electronic publication marked a significant moment in scholarship on women’s literary culture in post-Conquest England’. In a review of the printed version of Geddes's project for the Studies in Iconography journal, Patricia Stirnemann wrote that 'the book is something of a new genre. It is what one might call a "hardcopy-internet" interface [...] that complements the website".

== Publications ==
- Geddes, J 2017, Hunting Picts: Medieval Sculpture at St Vigeans, Angus. vol. 1&2, Historic Environment Scotland, Edinburgh. ISBN 1849172269
- Geddes, J (ed.) 2016, Medieval Art, Architecture and Archaeology in the Dioceses of Aberdeen and Moray. The British Archaeological Association Conference Transactions, Routledge Taylor & Francis Group, Abingdon. ISBN 1138640670
- Geddes, J 2011, Blacker, Beasts & the Bestiary: the inaugural Temenos Thetis Blacker memorial lecture. Temenos Academy Papers, no. 34, vol. 34, 1 edn, Temenos Academy, London, United Kingdom. ISBN 0956407846
- Geddes, J 2005, The St. Albans Psalter: A Book for Christina of Markyate. British Library Publishing Division. ISBN 0712306773
- Geddes, J 1999, Medieval Decorative Ironwork in England. Society of Antiquaries of London. ISBN 0854312730

== Personal life ==
Geddes is the daughter of David Campbell Geddes and Gerda Bruun. She has British/Norwegian nationality.

After marrying Peter Watt in 1979, she changed her name to Jane Watt. After their divorce, in 2008, she returned to Jane Geddes.

They have two children. She lives with her family near Aboyne.
