= Alf Jewett =

English footballer

Personal information
- Full name: Alfred William Jewett
- Date of birth: 15 November 1899
- Place of birth: Bitterne, Hampshire, England
- Date of death: 13 July 1980 (aged 80)
- Place of death: Southampton, Hampshire
- Height: 5 ft 11 in (1.80 m)
- Position: Centre half

Senior career*
Years	Team	Apps	(Gls)
- Bitterne United
1921–1922	Southampton	0	(0)
1922	Thornycrofts		
1922–1923	Arsenal	0	(0)
1923–1924	Lincoln City	37	(3)
1926	Wigan Borough	1	(0)
1926–19??	Bournemouth & Boscombe Athletic		
- * Club domestic league appearances and goals

Alfred William Jewett (15 November 1899 – 13 July 1980) was an English footballer who made 38 appearances in the Football League playing for Lincoln City and Wigan Borough as a centre half. He was on the books of Southampton and Arsenal, without representing either club in the league, and also played non-league football for Bitterne United, Thornycrofts, and Bournemouth & Boscombe Athletic.
