= Emett Clay Choate =

American judge

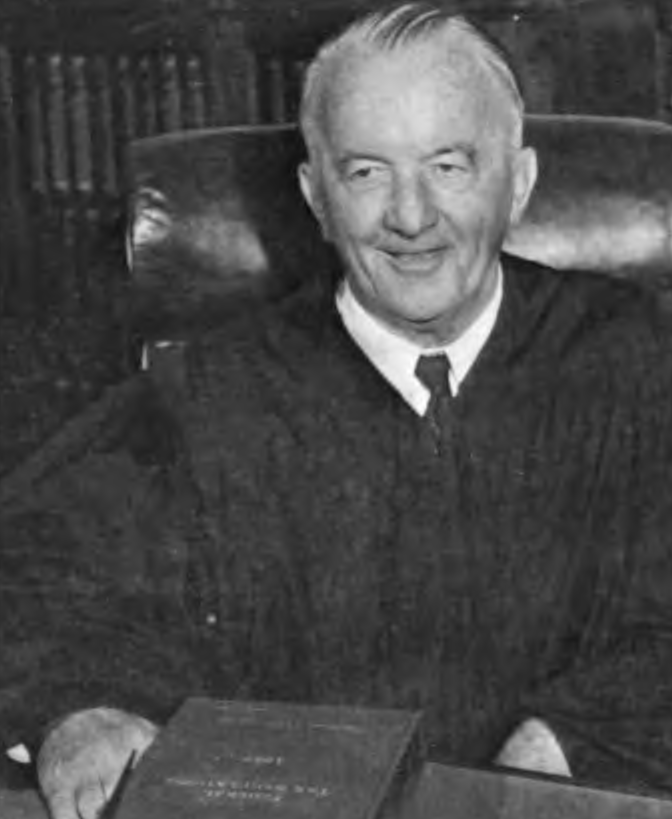

Senior Judge of the United States District Court for the Southern District of Florida
- In office January 31, 1965 – August 14, 1974

Judge of the United States District Court for the Southern District of Florida
- In office July 20, 1954 – January 31, 1965
- Appointed by: Dwight D. Eisenhower
- Preceded by: Seat established by 68 Stat. 8
- Succeeded by: William O. Mehrtens

Personal details
- Born: Emett Clay Choate; May 21, 1891 Columbus, Ohio, U.S.
- Died: August 14, 1974 (aged 83)
- Education: Indiana University Maurer School of Law (LL.B.)

Emett Clay Choate (May 21, 1891 – August 14, 1974) was an American lawyer and a United States district judge of the United States District Court for the Southern District of Florida.

== Education and career ==
Born in Columbus, Ohio, Choate received a Bachelor of Laws from Indiana University Maurer School of Law in 1914. Choate was a United States Army major from 1917 to 1918, during World War I. He was in private practice in Oklahoma City, Oklahoma from 1917 to 1921, in New York City, New York from 1922 to 1925, and in Miami, Florida from 1925 to 1954.

== Federal judicial service ==
Choate was nominated by President Dwight D. Eisenhower on June 22, 1954, to the United States District Court for the Southern District of Florida, to a new seat authorized by 68 Stat. 8. He was confirmed by the United States Senate on July 20, 1954, and received his commission the same day. He assumed senior status on January 31, 1965. His service terminated on August 14, 1974, due to his death.

Among his cases was that of Richard Paul Pavlick, a would-be-assassin stalking President-elect John F. Kennedy. Choate ruled that Pavlick was mentally ill and had him confined to a mental hospital.

== Sources ==
Legal offices
Preceded by Seat established by 68 Stat. 8	Judge of the United States District Court for the Southern District of Florida; 1954–1965	Succeeded by William O. Mehrtens
