= Stuart Rigold =

British archaeologist and numismatist (1919–1980)

- Born: 8 December 1919
- Died: 5 July 1980 (aged 60)
- Education: University of St Andrews, St. Peter's Hall University of Oxford
- Known for: Timber framing Numismatics
- Spouse: Married Eleanor Pike
- Scientific career
- Fields: Archaeology Photography
- Workplaces: Inspectorate of Ancient Monuments

Stuart Eborall Rigold FSA FRHistS FRSA (8 December 1919 – 5 July 1980) was a British photographer and archaeologist, who served as president of the British Numismatic Society between 1971 and 1975 and principal inspector of England for the Inspectorate of Ancient Monuments between 1976 and 1978. He had a keen personal interest in medieval architecture on which he studied and wrote extensively, and was a pioneer of the scholarship of timber framing.

== Early life and education ==
The Rigold family came originally from either Germany or Austria, the surname thought to be a likely variant of Reginald, and is also found as Rigault, Rigauld and Rigaud. His father was a mining engineer, and Stuart took his middle name, Eborall from his mother's maiden name. Stuart was reportedly proud of his initials S.E.R. due to his great-grandfather having been the general manager of the South Eastern Railway.

Stuart grew up close to Rolvenden in Kent, to which he remained particularly attached. As a student at Sutton Valence he stuttered which he managed in later life.

In 1936, at the age of 17, Stuart went up to the University of St Andrews to read geology together with English, French and classics. This was, however, to be cut short by the outbreak of war. Following service at Bletchley Park, working with the Enigma outfit and becoming a warrant officer II, he went up to St. Peter's Hall, Oxford to read Greats, matriculating in 1946.

== Employment ==
On coming down from Oxford in 1948 a BA (later progressing to MA), Rigold joined the Inspectorate of Ancient Monuments, which was to be the primary focus of his life's work. Here he worked for 30 years, becoming principal inspector for England in his final two years.

In 1963 Rigold was elected a Fellow of the Society of Antiquaries of London, serving on its council ten years later. He was also a prominent member of numerous other societies, including the Kent Archaeological Society, to whose publication, Archaeologia Cantiana he contributed a large number of articles. He played a prominent part in the Society for Medieval Archaeology, using his wide-ranging knowledge on the editorial committee, and also in the Royal and British Numismatic Societies, the latter of which he was president from 1971 to 1975 and gold medallist. He was familiar at both Burlington House and the Warburg Institute, where he was a highly valued contributor to discussions.

Photographs by Rigold are held in the Conway Library of art and architecture at the Courtauld Institute of Art.

== Personal life ==
Rigold Married Eleanor Pike in 1955, who survived him. The couple had no children.

== Bibliography ==
=== Biography ===
- Collectanea Historica. Essays in Memory of Stuart Rigold. (published by the Kent Archaeological Society) - Edited by Alec Detsicas. - First Edition: 1 April 1982. 320 pages.

=== Books ===
- Yarmouth Castle, Isle of Wight, Rigold, Stuart Eborall. London. 2012.
- Totnes Castle, Isle of Wight, Rigold, Stuart Eborall. London. 1987.
- Portchester Castle, Hampshire. Rigold, Stuart Eborall. London. 1985.
- Eynsford Castle, Kent. Rigold, Stuart Eborall. London. 1984.
- Nunney Castle, Somerset. Rigold, Stuart Eborall. London. 1977.
- Lilleshall Abbey, Shropshire. Ministry of Public Building and Works Ancient Monuments and Historic Buildings. Rigold, Stuart Eborall. London. 1969.

=== Select journal articles ===
==== Archaeologia Cantiana ====
- "A moated site at Moat Farm, Leigh, Kent". Dunning, Gerald C. • Parfitt, J. H. • Rigold, Stuart Eborall. - In: Archaeologia Cantiana vol. 92 (1976) p. 173-201
- "Eynsford Castle: the moat and bridge". Fleming, Andrew J. • Rigold, Stuart Eborall. - In: Archaeologia Cantiana vol. 88 (1973) p. 87-116
- "Eynsford Castle and its excavation." Rigold, Stuart Eborall. - In: Archaeologia Cantiana vol. 86 (1971) p. 109-171
- "Three Anglo-Saxon Disc brooches." Rigold, Stuart Eborall • Webster, Leslie E.. - In: Archaeologia Cantiana vol. 85 (1970) p. 1-18
- "Two lost court lodges - Longfield and Wootton." Baker, A. • Biddle, Martin • Rigold, Stuart Eborall. - In: Archaeologia Cantiana vol. 85 (1970) p. 61-70
- "Fourteenth-century halls in the East Weald." Rigold, Stuart Eborall. - In: Archaeologia Cantiana vol. 82 (1968) p. 246-256
- "Two types of court hall." Rigold, Stuart Eborall. - In: Archaeologia Cantiana vol. 83 (1968) p. 1-22
- "Two Kentish Carmelite houses - Aylesford and Sandwich." Rigold, Stuart Eborall. - In: Archaeologia Cantiana vol. 80 (1965) p. 1-28
- "Two Kentish hospitals re-examined: St. Mary, Ospringe, and St. Stephen and St. Thomas, New Romney." Rigold, Stuart Eborall. - In: Archaeologia Cantiana vol. 79 (1964) p. 31-69

==== British Numismatic Journal ====
- "The principal series of English sceattas." Rigold, Stuart Eborall. - In: British Numismatic Journal vol. 47 (1977) p. 21-30
- "A check-list of English finds of sceattas." Metcalf, David Michael • Rigold, Stuart Eborall. - In: British Numismatic Journal vol. 47 (1977) p. 31-52
- "A group of three sceattas from excavations at Mucking, Essex." Rigold, Stuart Eborall. - In: British Numismatic Journal vol. 47 (1977) p. 127-12
- "The two primary series of sceattas." Rigold, Stuart Eborall. - In: British Numismatic Journal vol. 35 (1966) p. 1-6
- "The trail of the Easterlings." Rigold, Stuart Eborall. - In: British Numismatic Journal vol. 26 (1949/51) p. 31-55

==== The Archaeological Journal ====
- "North Elmham Cathedral" (TF 988217). Rigold, Stuart Eborall • Heywood, Stephen. - In: The Archaeological Journal vol. 137 (1980) p. 327-329
- "Baconsthorpe Castle" (TG 121381). Rigold, Stuart Eborall. - In: The Archaeological Journal vol. 137 (1980) p. 331-332
- "New Buckenham Castle" (TF 084904). Rigold, Stuart Eborall. - In: The Archaeological Journal vol. 137 (1980) p. 353-355
- "The distribution of Early Romanesque towers to minor churches." Rigold, Stuart Eborall. - In: The Archaeological Journal vol. 136 (1979) p. 10-117
- "Thornton Abbey" (TA 115189). Rigold, Stuart Eborall. - In: The Archaeological Journal vol. 131 (1974) p. 373-377
- "Cotehele House" (SX 423685). Rigold, Stuart Eborall. - In: The Archaeological Journal vol. 130 (1973) p. 256-259
- "Charing Palace." Rigold, Stuart Eborall. - In: The Archaeological Journal vol. 126 (1969) p. 267
- "Chartham Church." Rigold, Stuart Eborall. - In: The Archaeological Journal vol. 126 (1969) p. 265-266
- "Lympne Castle." Rigold, Stuart Eborall. - In: The Archaeological Journal vol. 126 (1969) p. 260-262
- "Leeds Church." Rigold, Stuart Eborall. - In: The Archaeological Journal vol. 126 (1969) p. 256
- "Maidstone, the archiepiscopal precinct." Rigold, Stuart Eborall. - In: The Archaeological Journal vol. 126 (1969) p. 252-254
- "Patrixbourne Church." Rigold, Stuart Eborall. - In: The Archaeological Journal vol. 126 (1969) p. 214-215
- "Yardhurst, Daniel's Water." Rigold, Stuart Eborall. - In: The Archaeological Journal vol. 126 (1969) p. 267-269
- "Battel Hall, Leeds." Rigold, Stuart Eborall. - In: The Archaeological Journal vol. 126 (1969) p. 255-256
- "The demesne of Christ Church at Brook." Rigold, Stuart Eborall. - In: The Archaeological Journal vol. 126 (1969) p. 270-272
- "Timber-framed buildings in Kent." Rigold, Stuart Eborall. - In: The Archaeological Journal vol. 126 (1969) p. 198-200
- "Walmer Old Manor House." Rigold, Stuart Eborall. - In: The Archaeological Journal vol. 126 (1969) p. 215-217
- "Leeds Castle." Rigold, Stuart Eborall. - In: The Archaeological Journal vol. 126 (1969) p. 254-255
- "Two Camerae of the Military Orders." Rigold, Stuart Eborall. - In: The Archaeological Journal vol. 122 (1965) p. 86-132
- "Totnes Castle." Rigold, Stuart Eborall. - In: The Archaeological Journal vol. 114 (1957) p. 177-178

==== Medieval Archaeology ====
- "Structural aspects of medieval timber bridges: Addenda." Rigold, Stuart Eborall. - In: Medieval Archaeology vol. 20 (1976) p. 152-153
- "The Anglian Cathedral of North Elmham, Norfolk." Rigold, Stuart Eborall. - In: Medieval Archaeology vol. 6/7 (1962) p. 67-108

==== Journal of the British Archaeological Association ====
- "Brome, Suffolk, the excavations of a moated site, 1967." West, Stanley E. • Rigold, Stuart Eborall • Yaxley, David C.. - In: Journal of the British Archaeological Association Ser. 3, vol. 33 (1970) p. 89-121
- "Excavations at Dover Castle." Cook, A. M. • Mynard, Dennis C. • Rigold, Stuart Eborall. - In: Journal of the British Archaeological Association Ser. 3, vol. 32 (1969) p. 54-104
- "The "Double Minsters" of Kent and their analogies." Rigold, Stuart Eborall. - In: Journal of the British Archaeological Association Ser. 3, vol. 31 (1968) p. 27-37
- "Excavations at Dover Castle 1964–1966." Rigold, Stuart Eborall. - In: Journal of the British Archaeological Association Ser. 3, vol. 30 (1967) p. 87-121
- "The supposed see of Dunwich." Rigold, Stuart Eborall. - In: Journal of the British Archaeological Association Ser. 3, vol. 24 (1961) p. 55-59
