= Bill Cookson =

Australian rules footballer

Personal information
- Full name: William Henry James Cookson
- Born: 10 December 1900; Collingwood, Victoria
- Died: 19 July 1980 (aged 79); Parkville, Victoria
- Height: 168 cm (5 ft 6 in)
- Weight: 60 kg (132 lb)

Playing career^{1}
Years	Club	Games (Goals)
1924	Essendon	2 (3)
- ^{1} Playing statistics correct to the end of 1924.

William Henry James Cookson (10 December 1900 – 19 July 1980) was an Australian rules footballer who played with Essendon in the Victorian Football League (VFL).
