= Sven Helleberg =

Norwegian politician

Sven Helleberg (21 April 1929 – 15 July 1980) was a Norwegian politician for the Christian Democratic Party.

He served as a deputy representative to the Parliament of Norway from Telemark during the terms 1973–1977 and 1977–1971. In total he met during 72 days of parliamentary session. He worked as a school teacher in Skien.
