= János Komlós (writer) =

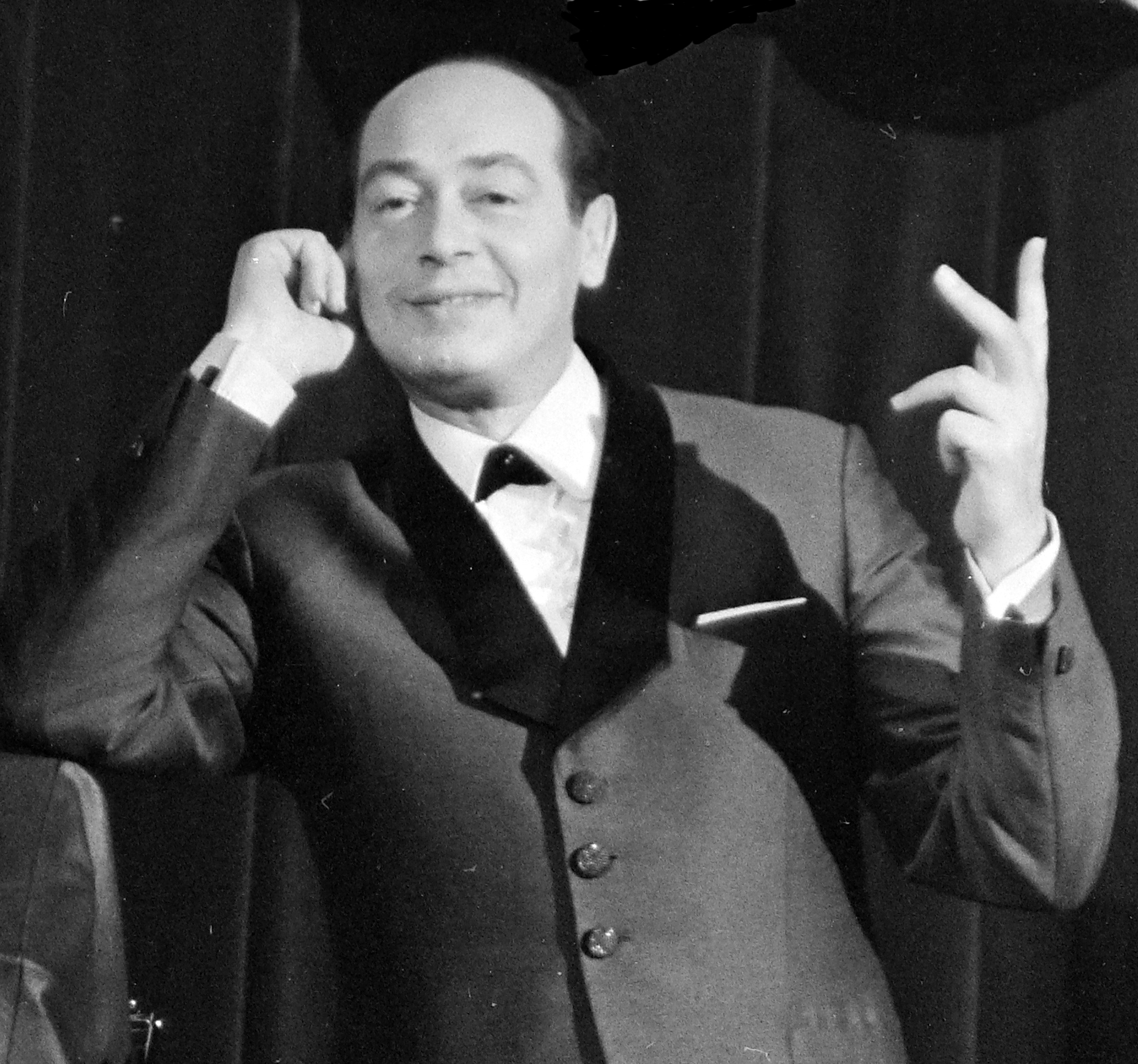
János Komlós (1970)

János Komlós (9 February 1922, in Budapest – 18 July 1980, in Budapest) was an influential Hungarian-Jewish writer, journalist, stand-up comedian during the Kádár political era in Hungary. A member of the ÁVH before 1956, he became an editor of the Népszabadság the Communist Party daily. In 1967, he founded the Mikroszkóp Színpad, which he directed until his death.

He was known for Minden kezdet nehéz (1966), Nem várok holnapig... (1967) and Teenager party (1966).
