= National Institute for the Honour Guard of the Royal Tombs of the Pantheon =

Coat of arms of the institute.

The National Institute for the Honour Guard of the Royal Tombs of the Pantheon (Italian: Istituto nazionale per la guardia d'onore alle reali tombe del Pantheon) is an Italian paramilitary company, originally chartered by the House of Savoy and subsequently operating with the authorisation of the Italian Republic, which mounts guards of honor at the royal tombs of the Roman Pantheon.

The organization was founded in 1878. As of 2014 it had about 4,000 personnel, of whom between 15 and 20 percent were women. Members, uniformed in black berets and cloaks bearing the coat of arms of the Kingdom of Italy, volunteer to assume shifts guarding the tombs of the Savoy dynasty.

Enlistment in the Honour Guard is open to Italian citizens who "share the aims of the Institute" and pay an initiation fee of €100, however, a majority of the total membership must be veterans of the Italian Armed Forces.
