= Stefania Turkewich =

Ukrainian composer, pianist, and musicologist (1898–1977)

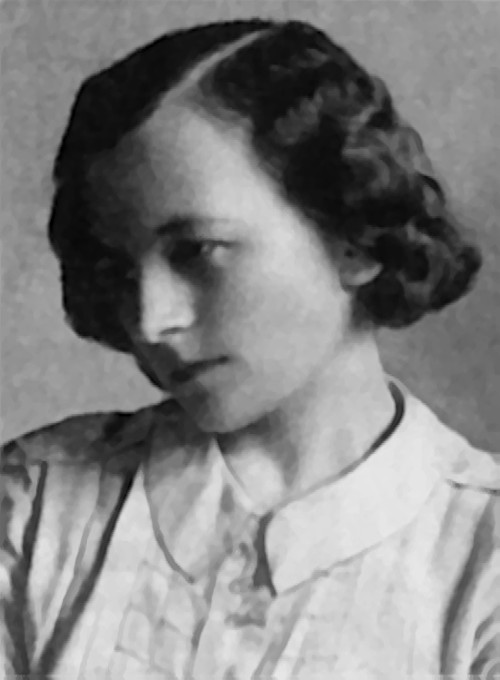
The composer as a young woman in 1920

Stefania Ivanivna Turkewich-Lukianovych (Note: also spelled Turkevycz and Turkevich.) (Ukrainian: Стефанія Іванівна Туркевич-Лукіянович; 25 April 1898 – 8 April 1977) was a Ukrainian composer, pianist, and musicologist. She is recognized as Ukraine's first woman composer. In the USSR, her works were banned by the state authorities.

== Biography ==
=== Childhood ===
Stefania Turkewich-Lukianovych was born in Lemburg, Austria-Hungary (now Lviv, Ukraine). Her grandfather, Lev Turkevich, and her father, Ivan Turkevich, were priests. Her mother, Sofia Kormoshiv, was a pianist who studied with the Polish pianist Karol Mikuli and the Czech pianist Vilém Kurz, and also accompanied the young Ukrainian soprano singer Solomiya Krushelnytska. The family was musically inclined and everyone played an instrument. Stefania played piano, harp, and harmonium. Later in life, she recalled her childhood love of music:

At the centre of everything was my mother, who played a wonderful piano. As a child, I loved very much to listen to her play. Then, we began a salon orchestra in our home. We played thus: father on the bass …, my mother on the piano, Lyonyo on cello, me on the harmonium, Marika and Zenko … on violins. Father started a family choir as well. These were our first steps into the world of music. Father never skimped on money or made excuses when it came to our musical life.

=== Studies ===
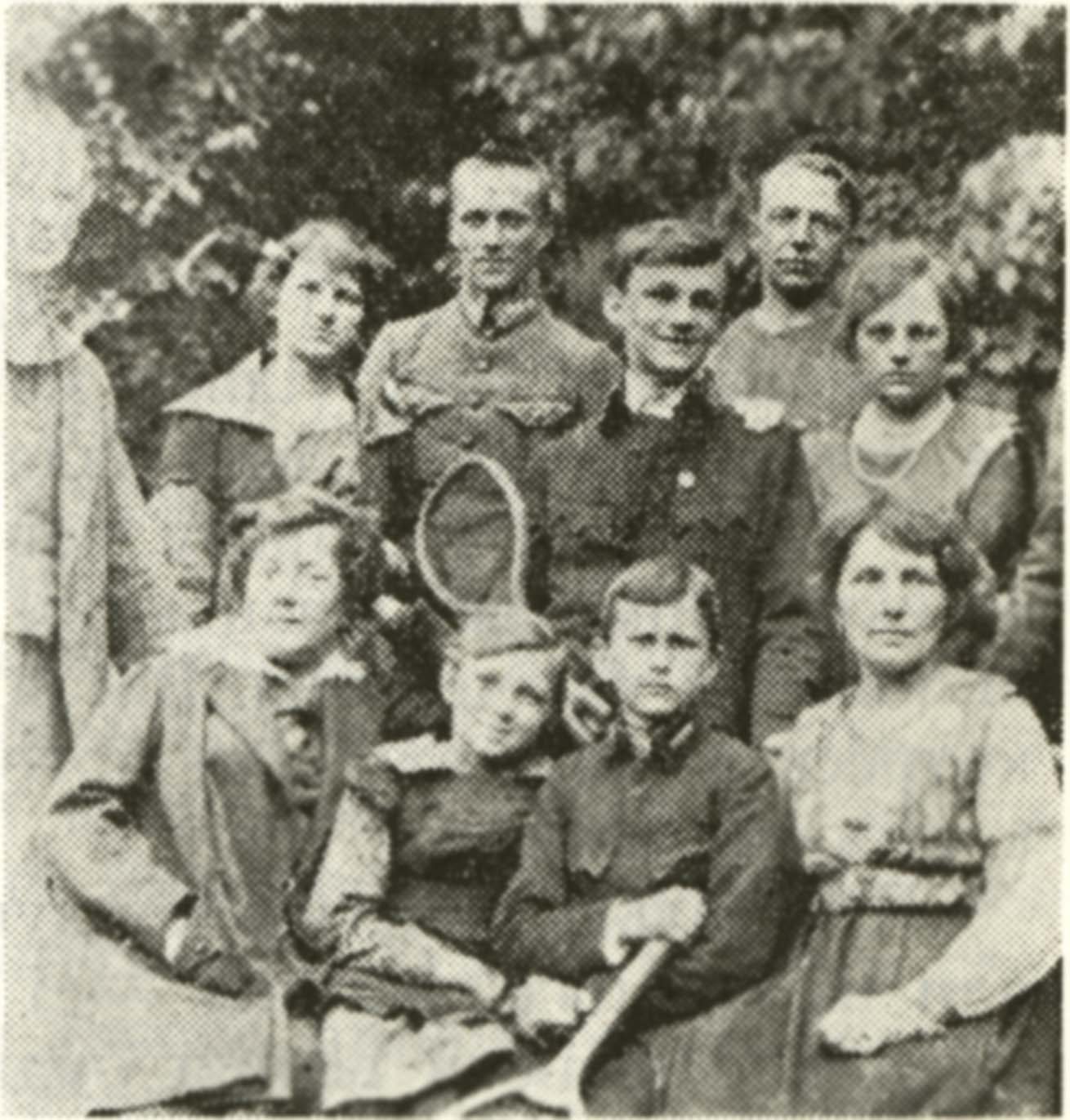
The Turkevycz family in Ukraine, c.1915: middle row (from left to right) Stefania's sister Irena, her brother Lev (with racket), and Stefania

Turkewich began her music studies with the Ukrainian composer Vasyl Barvinsky. From 1914 to 1916, she studied the piano in Vienna with Kurz. After World War I, she studied with the Polish musicologist Adolf Chybiński at the University of Lviv, and also attended his lectures on music theory at the Lviv Conservatory. In 1919, she wrote her first musical composition, a liturgy, which was performed in St. George's Cathedral, Lviv.

In 1921, Turkewich studied with the music historian Guido Adler at the University of Vienna and the Austrian composer Joseph Marx at the University of Music and Performing Arts Vienna, from where she graduated in 1923 with a teaching diploma. In 1925 she married the Ukrainian graphic artist Robert Lisovskyi and travelled with him to Berlin, where she lived from 1927 to 1930, and studied with the composers Arnold Schoenberg and Franz Schreker. In 1927, their daughter Zoya was born.

In 1930, Turkewich travelled to Prague, where she studied with the musicologist Zdeněk Nejedlý at Charles University, and with the composer Otakar Šín at the Prague Conservatory. She studied composition with the composer Vítězslav Novák at the music academy. In autumn 1933 she taught piano and became an accompanist at the Prague Conservatory. In 1934, she defended her doctoral dissertation on the topic of Ukrainian folklore in Russian operas.

She received her doctorate in musicology in 1934 from the Ukrainian Free University in Prague. She became the first woman from Galicia (which was then part of Poland) to receive a Doctor of Philosophy degree. Returning to Lviv in 1934, Turkewich worked as a teacher of musical theory and piano at the Lviv Conservatory, and became a member of the National Union of Composers of Ukraine.

=== World War Two ===
In autumn 1939, after the Soviet annexation of Eastern Galicia and Volhynia, Stefania worked as a tutor and a concertmaster at the Lviv Opera House. From 1940 to 1941 she was associate professor at the Lviv Conservatory. After the closure of the Conservatory during the Nazi occupation, she continued teaching at the State Musical School. In spring 1944 she left Lviv for Vienna.

Fleeing from the Red Army, in 1946 she moved to southern Austria, and from there to Italy, where her second husband, Nartsiz Lukyanovich, was a physician under the British command.

=== Postwar life in Britain ===
In autumn 1946, Turkewich moved to the UK, initially living in Brighton before moving to live in London in 1951. She later lived in Barrow Gurney near Bristol from 1952 to 1962, Belfast from 1962, and Cambridge from 1973. In the late 1940s, Turkewich returned to composing. From time to time she acted again as a pianist, in particular in 1957 in a series of concerts performed for Ukrainian communities in Britain, and in 1959 at a concert of piano music in Bristol. She was a member of the British Society of Women-Composers and Musicians.

Turkewich's opera Oksana's Heart was performed in Winnipeg in 1970 at the Centennial Concert Hall, under the artistic direction of her sister Irena Turkevycz-Martynec. She continued to compose through the 1970s. She died on 8 April 1977, aged 78, in Cambridge.

== Compositions ==
StefaniaTurkewich is recognized as Ukraine's first woman composer. Her works were banned in Ukraine by the Soviet authorities.

The following is a list of compositions by Turkewich, classified by genre and type of work.

=== Symphonic works ===
- Симфонія – Symphony no. 1 – 1937
- Симфонія no. 2(a) – Symphony no. 2(a) – 1952
- Симфонія no. 2(b) (2-гий варіант) – Symphony no. 2(b) (2nd version)
- Симфонієта – Symphoniette – 1956
- Три Симфонічні Ескізи – Three Symphonic Sketches – 3-го травня, 1975
- Симфонічна поема – Symphonic Poem «La Vitа»
- Space Symphony – 1972
- Суіта для подвійного струнного оркестру – Suite for Double String Orchestra
- Fantasy for Double String Orchestra

=== Ballets ===
- Руки – The Girl with the Withered Hands – Bristol, 1957
- Перли – The Necklace
- Весна (Дитячий балет) – Spring – (Children's Ballet) 1934-5
- Мавка (a) – Mavka – ‘The Nymph’ – 1964-7 – Belfast
- Страхопуд – Scarecrow – 1976

=== Opera ===
- Мавка – Mavka – (unfinished) based on Lesia Ukrainka’s Forest Song

=== Children’s operas ===
- «Цар Ох» або Серце Оксани – Tsar Okh or Heart of Oksana – 1969
- «Куць» – The Young Devil
- «Яринний городчик» – A Vegetable Plot (1969)

=== Choral works ===
- Літургія 1919 – Liturgia/Liturgy
- Psalm to Sheptytsky (Псалом Шептицькому)
- До Бою – To Battle
- Триптих – Triptych
- Колискова (А-а, котика нема) 1946 – Lullaby

=== Chamber – Instrumental works ===
- Соната для скрипки і фортепіано 1935 – Sonata for violin and piano
- Cтрунний квартет 1960 – 1970 – String quartet
- Тріо для скрипки, альта і віолончела 1960 – 1970 – Trio for Violin, Viola and Cello
- Квінтет для двох скрипок, альта, віолончела фортепіано 1960 – 1970 – Piano Quintet
- Тріо для флейти, кларнету, фагота 1972 – Wind Trio

=== Piano works ===
- Варіації на Українську тему 1932 – Variations on a Ukrainian Theme
- Фантазія: Суїта фортепянна на Українські теми – Fantasia: Suite for Piano on Ukrainian Themes 1940
- Імпромпту – Impromptu 1962
- Гротеск – Grotesque 1964
- Гірська сюїта – Mountain Suite 1966 – 1968
- Цикл п’єс для дітей – Cycle of Pieces for Children 1936 – 1946
- Українські коляди та щедрівки – Ukrainian carols and Shchedrivka
- Вістку голосить – Good Tidings
- Christmas with Harlequin 1971

=== Miscellaneous ===
i. – Серце – Heart – Solo voice with orchestra
ii. – Лорелеї – Lorelei – Narrator, Harmonium and Piano 1919 – words by Lesia Ukrainka
iii. – Май – May – 1912
iv. – Тема народної пісні – Folk Song Themes
v. – На Майдані – Independence Square – piano piece
vi. – Не піду до леса з конечкамі – Лемківська пісня – Lemky song for voice and strings

== Discography (selected) ==
- Violin Sonata, String Trio, Piano Quintet. Immersio Vienna and Friends. CPO Records, 2026.

== Sources ==
- Pavlyshyn, S. (2004). Перша українська композиторка: Стефанія Туркевич-Лісовська-Лукіянович [The First Ukrainian Female Composer: Stefaniya Turkevich-Lisovska-Lukiyanovych] (in Ukrainian). Lviv.
