= Mieczysław Sołtys =

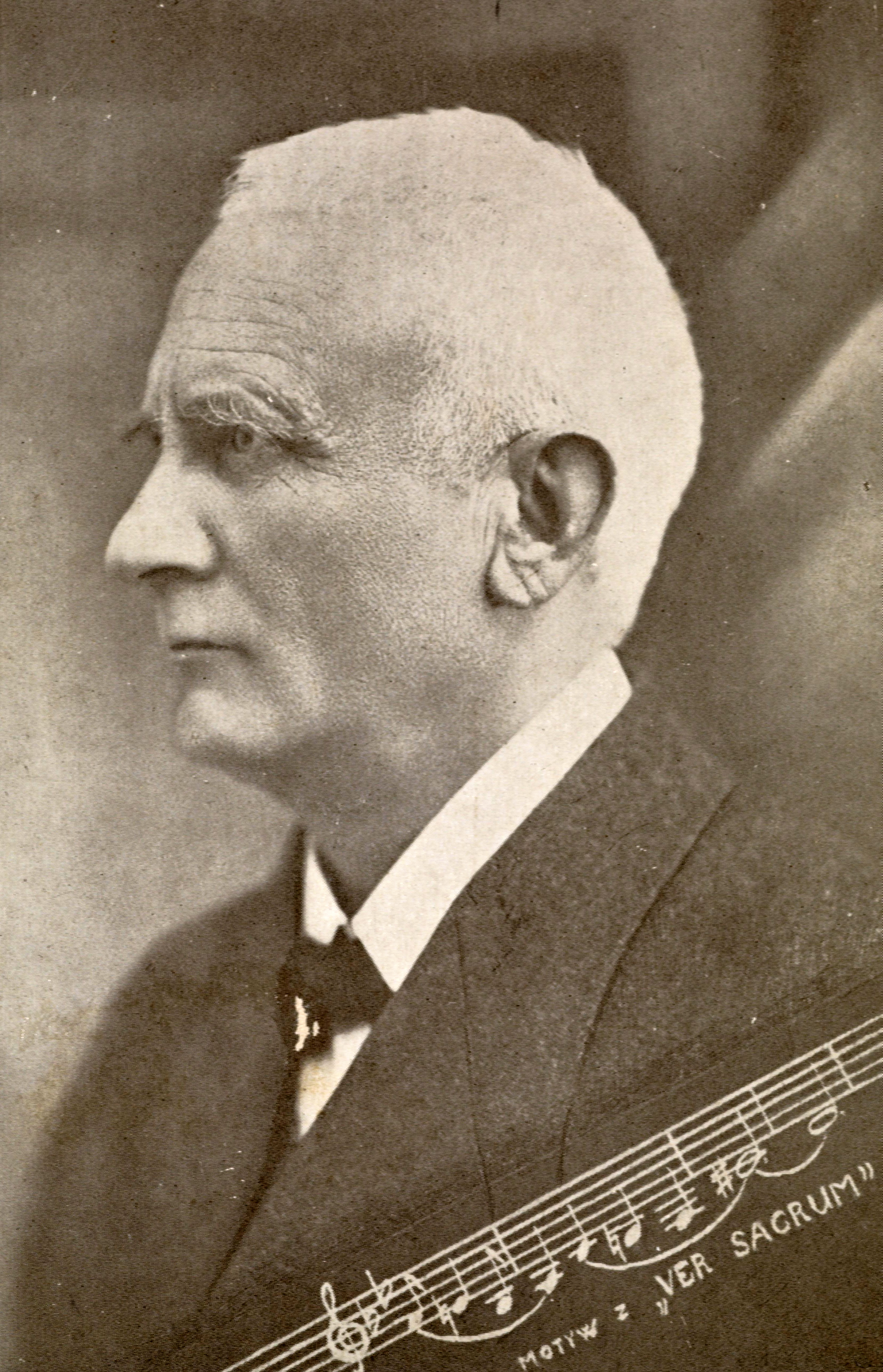
Mieczysław Sołtys

Mieczysław Sołtys (February 7, 1863 – November 11, 1929) was a Polish composer, conductor, teacher, music and public figure.

== Biography ==
He studied in Lviv Conservatory as a composer (under Carl Mikuli) and at the same time as philosopher in Lviv University. Then continued to study composition in Vienna and Paris (under Camille Saint-Saens).

In the 1890s he was the conductor of the Lviv choirs of the Echo and Lute societies. From 1891 he was a professor, and from 1899 to 1929 he was director of the Lviv Conservatory. From 1919 he was the chairman of the Polish Union of Musicians in Lviv. He died in Lviv, buried in Lychakiv Cemetery.

Among his students are Stanyslav Lyudkevych and Yosyf Lerer. Mieczysław Sołtys is the author of five operas, including "Maria, Ukrainian Tale" (1909), two symphonies, three symphonic poems, three oratorios, piano concertos, works for organs, choir and solo songs.

His son, Adam Sołtys, was a prominent Polish conductor and composer.

== Awards ==
- 1908 - Order of Franz Joseph I
- 1929 - the Commander's Cross of the Order of Polonia Restituta.
