= Irena Turkevycz-Martynec =

Austrian performer (1899–1983)

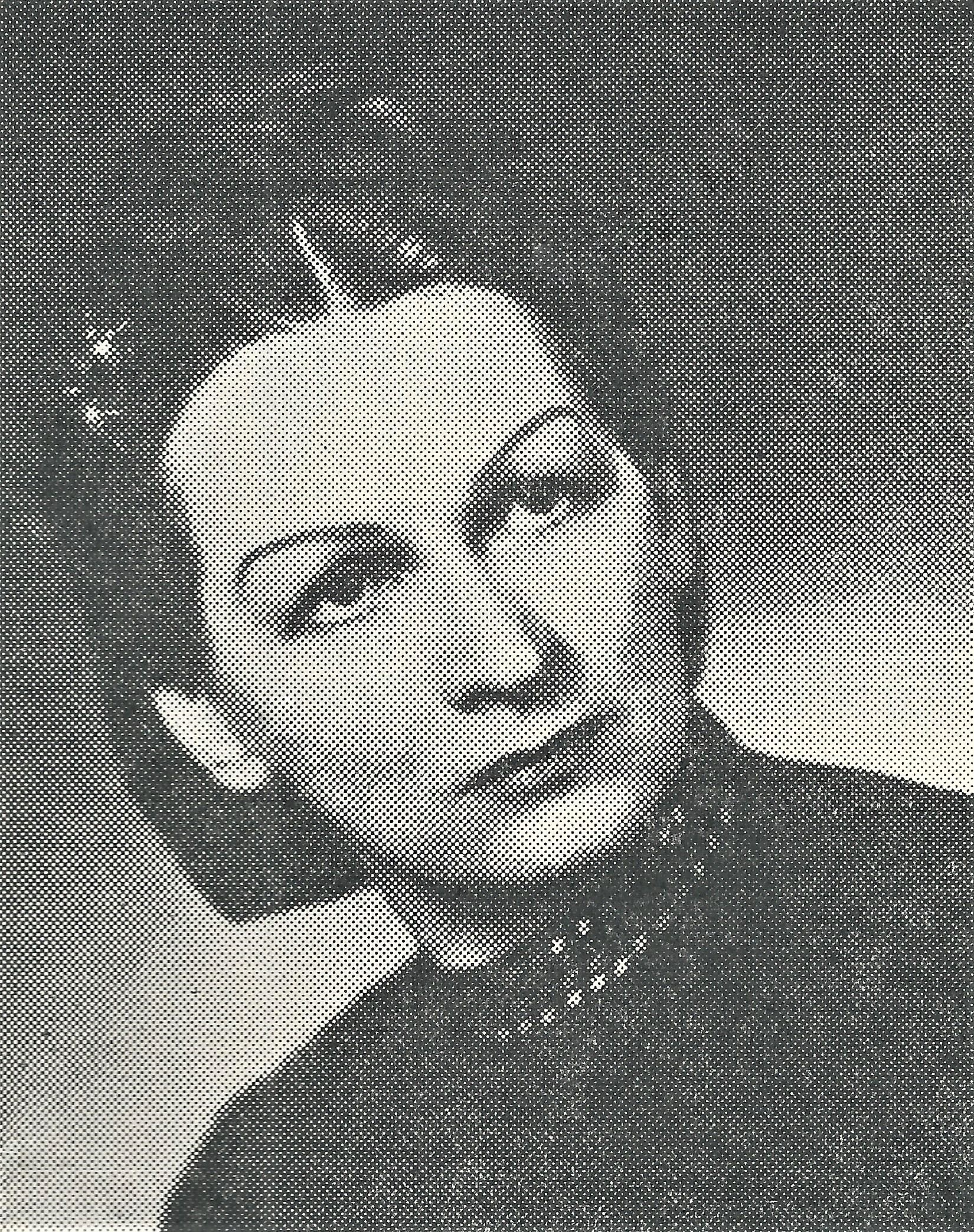
- Born: Irena Turkevycz; Birth date, December 25, 1899; Brody, Kingdom of Galicia and Lodomeria, Austria-Hungary
- Died: Death date, July 5, 1983; Winnipeg, Manitoba, Canada
- Education: University of Lviv, Lviv Conservatory, Berlin Conservatory
- Occupations: Opera (Prima donna); Director; Singing teacher
- Years active: 1920's–1970's
- Spouse: Volodymyr Martynec

Irena Turkevycz-Martynec (25 December 1899 – 5 July 1983) was born in Brody, Kingdom of Galicia and Lodomeria, and came to Canada, to Winnipeg, in 1949. She was a Prima donna in the Lviv Theatre of Opera and Ballet, and performed in Paris, Vienna, Berlin, Prague, and many other European cities during her long and storied career.

== Early life ==
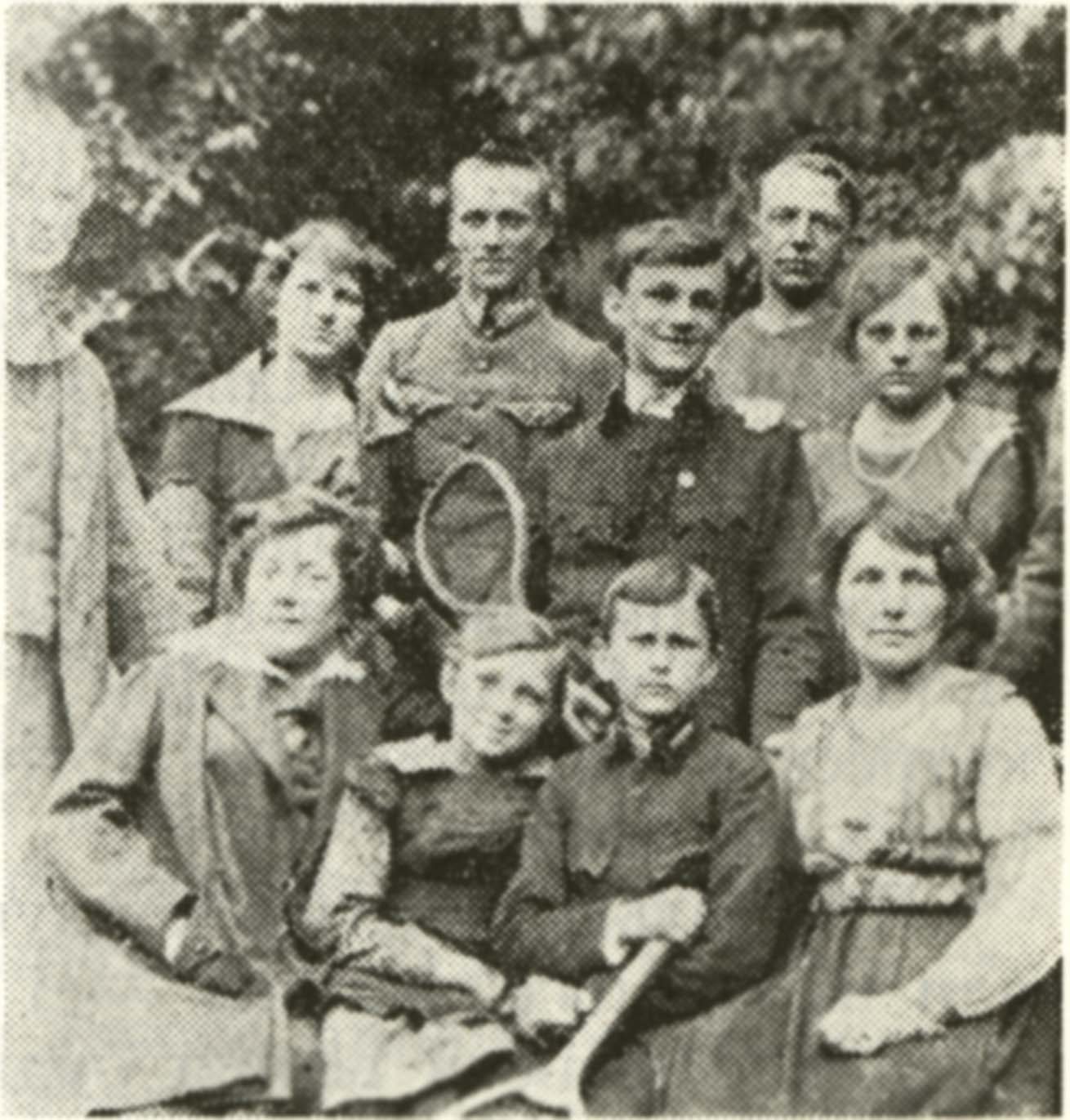
Middle Row (left to right): Irena, brother Lev (with racket), sister Stefania, circa 1915

Irena Turkevycz was born on December 25, 1899, in Brody, in today's Lviv Oblast, Ukraine. She was the third child in the family of priest, choir conductor, catechist, and music critic Ivan Turkevycz (Туркевич). Her mother was Sofia Kormoshiv (Кормошів).

When Irena was six, her father was appointed catechist of the Teaching Seminary in Zalishchyky (Заліщики), where he was provided with a separate house located near the Dniester river. He became the soul of the musical life of the city, often involving his wife Sophia, a musically gifted pianist, and his children. Irena received her first music lessons from her mother, and later a professional music teacher appeared in their house. From a very young age Irena acquired musical and artistic skills and participated in Shevchenko concerts.

In 1911, her father was appointed catechist of the 2nd Ukrainian Gymnasium in Lviv, and the family moved there to a permanent residence. Here Irena enrolled as a pupil in the gymnasium of the Basilian Sisters, where besides school, she took piano lessons, and Stanyslav Lyudkevych (Станіслав Людкевич) taught her music theory.

Before the start of the First World War the family left for Vienna, where they stayed until 1916. There, at the Church of St. Barbara her father directed the choir, which at that time was one of the largest and best Ukrainian church choirs in Europe. Upon returning to Lviv, Irena continued her studies with the Basilian Sisters.

== Studies ==
Irena became a student in the Faculty of Law at the University of Lviv. When she began her studies in music, it was at the Lviv Conservatory, a state conservatory, with Professor Flem-Plomensky (Флям-Пломенський) and with Professor Zaremba (Заремба). She graduated from drama school in Lviv studying with Professor Kozlovsky (Козловський), and with Professor Kryzhanivsky (Крижанівський, Богдан Володимирович). Her concert activity began in 1923 as a soloist with the Lviv choir "Bandurist" (Бандурист).

On the opera stage, she first performed as Mařenka in Bedřich Smetana’s The Bartered Bride. This opera was staged at the "Ukrainian Discourse Theatre" (Театр Української Бесіди) by Yosyp Stadnyk (Стадник, Йосип Дмитрович) on the occasion of the centenary of the composer's birthday.

On June 21, 1929, on the stage of the Lviv Theatre of Opera and Ballet, a performance of the opera Fidelio by Ludwig van Beethoven was given. Senior students of the Lviv Conservatory under the direction of their teacher Adam Soltys participated. Among these performers was Irena. In a review in the newspaper "Dilo" (Діло), June 22, 1929, she was singled out for praise.

She also showed promise as a dramatic actress. She tried directing. Writer Zinovy Knysh writes in his memoirs about the musical life of Lviv, and that in 1929 Irena organized a theatrical group in her father's house and put on plays: "The Sin" by Volodymyr Vynnychenko, and "The Fires Of St. John" by Hermann Sudermann.

In the spring of 1930, her first solo concert was held, at which Irena performed arias, of Gorislava from the opera Ruslan and Lyudmila by Mikhail Glinka, of Cio-Cio-san from Madama Butterfly by Giacomo Puccini, several romances, and Ukrainian folk songs.

In 1930, she went to Berlin, where her sister Stefania lived at that time, and Irena studied for three years at the Berlin University of the Arts with Professor Weissenborn (Вайсенборн) who worked with students of the likes of Dietrich Fischer-Dieskau. She learned voice control in the Berlin State Opera, and completed her drama schooling at the Hochschule für Musik.

In 1933 Irena moved to Prague where her sister, Stefania, now taught piano and was an accompanist at the Prague Conservatory. Irena took vocal lessons with professors at the Prague Conservatory and sang in the Prague Opera.

== Career ==
Irena married the politician, Volodymyr Martynec and followed him where his work took them, and resourcefully found herself singing in cities across Europe. This nomadic life lasted for 12 years.

In the summer of 1942, Irena returned to Lviv with her husband, where she was invited to join the Lviv Theatre of Opera and Ballet. From 1942 to 1944, she sang these roles in the following operas:

Opera	Composer	Role
Zaporozhets za Dunayem	Semen Hulak-Artemovsky	Oksana
Kateryna	Mykola Arkas	Mother
Halka	Stanisław Moniuszko	Halka
Faust	Charles Gounod	Margarita
Carmen	Georges Bizet	Micaëla
La traviata	Giuseppe Verdi	Violetta
Manon	Jules Massenet	Manon
Tosca	Giacomo Puccini	Tosca
The Queen of Spades	Pyotr Ilyich Tchaikovsky	Liza

In the summer of 1943, Irena, along with the coloratura soprano Nina Shevchenko and the baritone Mikhail Olkhov, did a large concert tour of the cities and villages of Galicia. Her voice was often heard on Lviv Radio.

Her husband, a politician, was aware of the changing landscape that the war was bringing in its wake. In the spring of 1944, Irena and a group from the Lviv opera, packed and headed west for Germany just weeks before the Soviet army's arrival.

Irena became a leader of the opera ensembles "Duma" (Дума) in Karlsbad (Baden), and "Orlik" (Орлик) in Berchtesgaden, Germany. These collectives put on, along with other works, the operas: Natalka Poltavka (Наталка Полтавка) by Mykola Lysenko, and Drowned (Утоплена) a lyric-fantastic opera again by the Ukrainian composer Mykola Lysenko, the libretto written by the Ukrainian writer and playwright Mykhailo Starytsky from Nikolai Gogol's story May Night from the collection Evenings on a Farm Near Dikanka.

On January 28, 1946, in the camp for displaced persons located near Augsburg, Germany an organization called "The Association of Ukrainian Stage Artists" (Об’єднання мистців української сцени) was created, and Irena was on the board, along with: V. Blavatsky, Y. Barnych, E. Kuril, S. Kryzhanivsky and T. Fedorovich.

== Canada ==
In 1949 Irena immigrated to Canada and settled in Winnipeg. Her husband took the post of editor of the newspaper "New Pathway" (Новий шлях), and Irena became a member of the "Renaissance" (Ренесанс) theater.

In 1960, Irena became very active working with children's opera in Winnipeg at the Canadian-Ukrainian Institute Prosvita, on Pritchard Avenue and Arlington Street, in the city's North-End. Her musical company rehearsed at The Ukrainian National Home Association building on McGregor St. and Burrows Ave. Her very presence attracted a talented group of musicians, choreographers, and set and costume people. She became the nucleus for an ensemble of gifted children whom she began to mentor. She was known to the kids as Pani Martynec (Пані Мартинець). In 1964, they performed Mykola Lysenko's Koza Dereza (Коза-Дереза).

Koza Dereza, a Children's operetta by Mykola Lysenko, will be presented by the women's council of the Ukrainian Canadian Committee May 28 at the Playhouse Theatre. A Ukrainian operetta, Koza Dereza was written by the father of Ukrainian music and will be performed by 100 children from various Ukrainian schools in Metro Winnipeg. Production is under the direction of Mrs. Irene Turkevycz-Martynec, a former prima-donna of the Lviv Opera Theatre. The producer is Sonia Zyla. Choreography and dancing will be directed by Mrs. Daria Nyzankiwska-Snihurowycz. The orchestra will be directed by Oleh Lewytskyj. Sets were designed by E. Kozak of Detroit. The costumes, designed to represent different regions and periods of the Ukraine, were designed by Luba Huk. The animal masks were created by Nadya Kostyshyn. Accompanist for the production is Wirlana Kysilewsky.

In 1965, the cast performed The Snow Queen (Зимова Краля) by Mykola Lysenko. Both Koza Dereza and The Snow Queen were staged at the Pantages Playhouse Theatre in Winnipeg.

In 1967, her musical troupe traveled from Winnipeg by train to Montreal to perform Koza Dereza at the International and Universal Exposition (Expo 67) which was also being held to celebrate Canada's centennial year. From Montreal, the performers were bused to Ottawa for an encore concert.

== Legacy ==
The Ukrainian Canadian Congress presented the Shevchenko Medal to Irena on October 7, 1977, in Winnipeg.

Many of the young people in her company carried on her spirit when they grew up. Irena Welhasch (Baerg), who played the crab in Koza Dereza, went on to a career in opera herself, performing on stages of major opera houses across North America. Genia Blum, a dancer, writer and translator, who danced the role of Lada in Snow Queen, studied at the Royal Winnipeg Ballet School, danced professionally in Europe under her maiden name Eugenia Snihurowycz, and founded a ballet studio in Lucerne, Switzerland, where she continues to support the arts through a dance foundation named after her mother, Daria Nyzankiwska. Russell Mychajluk (Mitchell), who played the rabbit in Koza Dereza, went on to write and produce music for the pop charts, for television, and for theatre. Myroslav (Slavko) Klymkiw, who played the bear in Koza Dereza, went on to become Head of Network Programming for the C.B.C. Still others, from her musical group, became facilitators and administrators in cultural institutions in Canada.

Irena Turkevycz-Martynec died July 5, 1983, in Winnipeg.

== Bibliography ==
- Marunchak, Michael, H. The Ukrainian Canadians: A History, Winnipeg, Ottawa: Ukrainian Free Academy of Sciences, 1970.
