= Allan Evans =

Allan Evans may refer to:

- Allan Evans (Australian sportsman) (1897–1955), Western Australian cricketer and footballer
- Allan Evans (footballer) (born 1956), Scotland international footballer and Aston Villa player
- Allan Evans (politician) (1917–1992), politician in Newfoundland, Canada
- Allan Evans (record producer) (1956–2020), American musicologist and record producer

== See also ==
- Alan Evans (1949–1999), Welsh darts player
- Alan Evans (academic), Canadian neurologist and neuroscientist
- Alan Evans, drummer for Soulive
- Alun Evans (disambiguation)
