= Daria Nyzankiwska-Snihurowycz =

Ballet dancer (b. 1912, d. 1980)

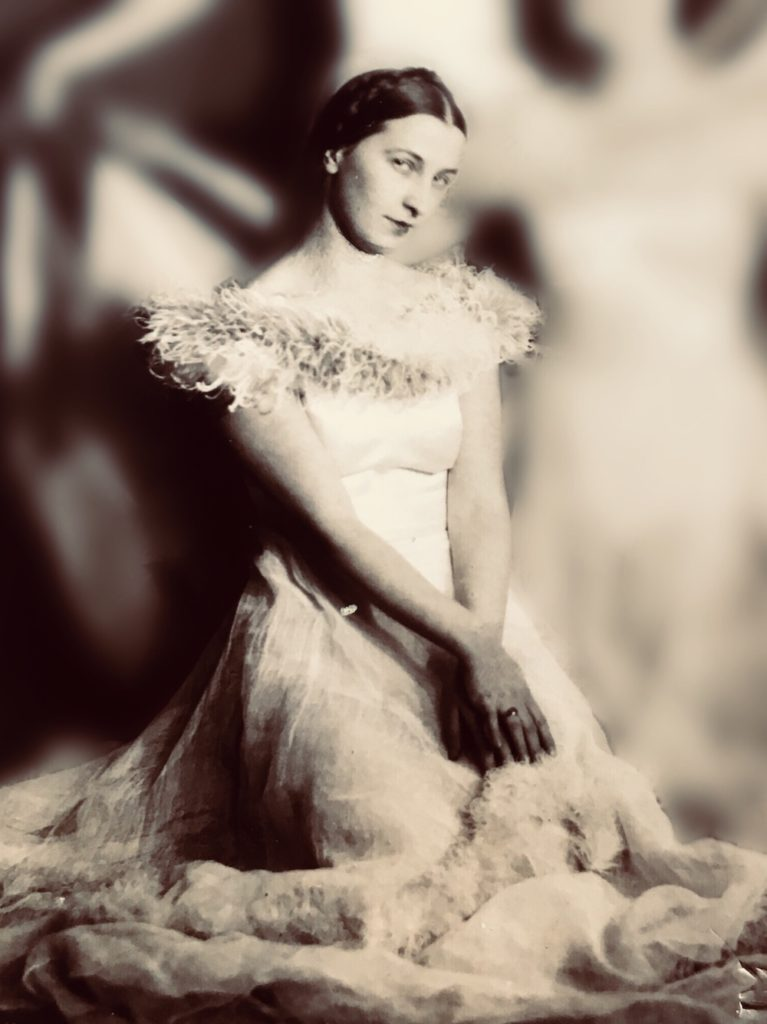
- Born: Daria Nyzankiwska; Birth date, August 15, 1912; Lviv, Ukraine
- Died: Death date, July 23, 1980; Winnipeg, Manitoba, Canada
- Education: Ballet School of Oksana Suchoverska
- Occupations: Opera (Principal dancer); Choreographer; Teacher
- Years active: 1920s–1970s
- Spouse: Taras Snihurowycz

Daria Nyzankiwska-Snihurowycz (Ukrainian: Дарія Нижанківська-Снігурович, romanized: Dariia Nyzhankivska-Snihurovych; August 15, 1912 – July 23, 1980) was born in Lviv, Ukraine. She was a teacher, a choreographer, and a Prima Ballerina in the Lviv Theatre of Opera and Ballet.

== Family's theatrical history ==
Nyzankiwska-Snihurowycz's grandfather was the actor Julian Nizhankivsky (Ukrainian: Юліян Нижанківський, romanized: Yuliian Nyzhankivskyi; 1838 – 91), an actor in the Ruska Besida Theater founded in 1864 in Lviv. He acted in the theatre's premier production of "Marusya" that year. Her father, Ambrosi, Julian's son, followed in his father's footsteps and became an actor. After Daria's mother, Genia, married her father, she joined him for a life on the stage, touring the cities, towns, and villages of Ukraine. The actors sewed their own costumes and helped build the sets for their performances.

== Education ==
At the age of eight, Nyzankiwska-Snihurowycz joined the ballet school of Oksana Suchoverska, whom she studied with for ten years. After graduating, she went to Prague to continue to work on her dance, alongside the ballerina Mia Slavenska. Being the same age, the young women became friends. When Slavenska left for Paris in 1937, Nyzankiwska-Snihurowycz returned to Lviv in late 1938, and for a time she studied with Prof. Buri, and ballet masters A. Falishevsky and V. Pereyaslavets.

== Principal dancer ==
In the summer of 1939, Nyzankiwska-Snihurowycz became a principal dancer of the Lviv Opera and Ballet Theater. Here, she worked with ballet-master Yevhen Dmytrovych Vihilov who worked from 1941 to 1944 at the Lviv Opera House. "The traditions of the romantic epoch and academic ballet were preserved predominantly in the opera theater ballet troupe performances. It was considered to be the leading one in the region (with ballet-masters - S.Falishevski, A.Fortunato, A.Romanovski, M.Statkevich)."

Nyzankiwska-Snihurowycz's first onstage experience here was in the opera Aida by Giuseppe Verdi, not as a dancer but as a Nubian slave, holding a large papier-mâché palm leaf over the ruler. A ballet interlude would be added in the opera afterwards.

During her years as principal dancer, some of the operas that included ballets in which she danced were: La traviata by Giuseppe Verdi, Il trovatore by Giuseppe Verdi, Carmen by Georges Bizet, Tosca by Giacomo Puccini, Madama Butterfly by Giacomo Puccini, Pagliacci by Ruggero Leoncavallo, The Bartered Bride by Bedřich Smetana, and Faust by Charles Gounod.

Nyzankiwska-Snihurowycz became the leading ballerina in ballets: Odette in Swan Lake by Pyotr Ilyich Tchaikovsky, Dulcinea in Don Quixote by Ludwig Minkus, Swanhilda in Coppélia by Léo Delibes, Taï-Choa in The Red Poppy by Reinhold Glière, Anitra in Peer Gynt by Edvard Grieg, and others.

== Post-war ==
In the spring of 1944, Nyzankiwska-Snihurowycz, along with a group from the Lviv opera, packed and headed west for Germany before the Soviet army's arrival. She met her husband in a displaced persons' camp in Austria, and they married. She taught dance to the children of the camp. Her "Ukrainian Dance Knot" was performed by Ukrainian children at the International Festival of 1945 in Innsbruck.

In the spring of 1950, Nyzankiwska-Snihurowycz, along with her husband Taras Snihurowycz, emigrated to Canada and settled in Winnipeg.

== Canada ==
Ukrainian immigrant theatre had been flourishing since the turn of the century in Winnipeg. Now, the post-war generation prepared to make their contribution. On July 23, 1950, Nyzankiwska-Snihurowycz participated in a concert with other Ukrainian artists newly arrived from Europe, as part of the Renaissance theater: I. Turkevich-Martynets, G. Manko, A. Stepniak, I. Fedyshin and L. Levyts'ka. Their concert took place at the church of St. Nicholas on McGregor Street and Flora Avenue, in its church hall which was a memorable structure partially sunken in the earth, in the North-End of Winnipeg.

=== Ballet choreographer ===
In 1970, in Winnipeg at the Centennial Concert Hall, the premier of Stefania Turkewich's opera "Tsar Okh or Heart of Oksana" brought together the three who had worked together at the Lviv Theatre of Opera and Ballet: Stefania Turkewich who had served as a concertmaster, Irena Turkevycz-Martynec who had been a Prima donna, and Nyzankiwska-Snihurowycz who had been a Prima Ballerina. Nyzankiwska-Snihurowycz choreographed Stefania's opera and Irena directed the piece.

Nyzankiwska-Snihurowycz choreographed a three-act ballet "The Night of Ivan Kupala" a celebration of the summer solstice in Ukraine and other Slavic countries, when nights are at their shortest. She wrote her own libretto for this ballet, and worked with the dance group Yevshan in Saskatoon, where the premiere took place in the summer of 1971.

=== Ballet teacher ===
Nyzankiwska-Snihurowycz was a member of the board of the Royal Winnipeg Ballet from 1973 to 1976. She became a teacher at the RWB School in 1975. Her choreography was part of the RWB School repertoire in 1980, the year that she died.

Maria Pasternakova, in her book Ukrainian Women in Choreography wrote: "Daria Nyzankiwska-Snihurowycz's ballet classes combine technique with the character of stylized Ukrainian folk dances, while revealing detailed knowledge of the basic laws of composition. In this kind of creative work, she reveals the wide possibilities of folk dances, enriching and raising the Ukrainian choreographic art to a high level."

=== Legacy ===
Nyzankiwska-Snihurowycz died July 23, 1980, in Winnipeg. Her daughter, Genia Blum, who danced the role of Lada in the children's opera Snow Queen in the 1965 production that her mother choreographed, studied at the Royal Winnipeg Ballet School and danced professionally in Europe under her maiden name Eugenia Snihurowycz. From 1992 until 2018 she carried on her mother's work and legacy with her own ballet studio in Lucerne, Switzerland. Today, she is a writer and translator, and continues to support the arts through the Daria Nyzankiwska Dance Foundation.

== Bibliography ==
- Pasternakova, Maria. Ukrainian Woman in Choreography (Пастернакова, Марія. Українська жінка б хореографії); Published by Ukrainian Women's Association of Canada, Winnipeg, Edmonton, Canada, 1963.
