= Alun Evans (disambiguation) =

Alun Evans (born 1949) is an English former footballer.

Alun Evans may also refer to:

- Alun Evans (cricketer) (born 1975), Welsh cricketer
- Alun Evans (FAW) (1942–2011), Football Association of Wales Secretary General
- Alun Evans (New Zealand footballer) (born 1965), New Zealand footballer
- Alun Evans (priest) (born 1947), Welsh Anglican priest
- Alun Tan Lan, singer-songwriter (born Alun Evans)

== See also ==
- Allan Evans (disambiguation)
