= Marie Rosenthal-Hatschek =

German artist (1896–1942)

Marie Olga Rosenthal
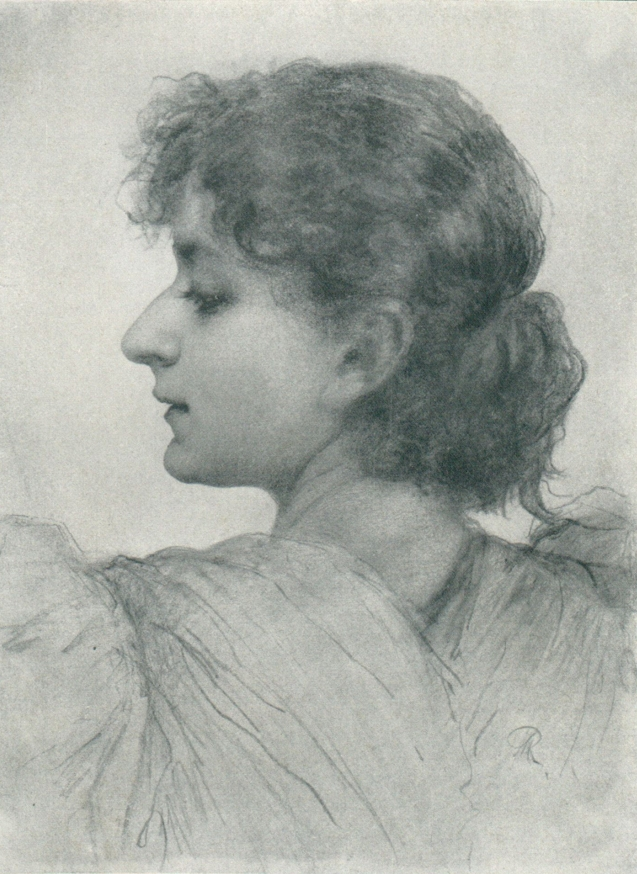
- A self-portrait painted between 1890 and 1900
- Born: 28 March 1869; Lviv, Austrian Empire
- Died: 1942 (aged 72–73); Banjica concentration camp, Serbia
- Spouse: Berthold Hatschek
- Children: 2
- Relatives: Moriz Rosenthal (brother)

Marie Olga Rosenthal-Hatschek (28 March 1869 – 1942) was an Austrian painter, known for her portraits.

Hatschek was born on 28 March 1869 in Lviv, Austrian Empire (now Ukraine). She studied in Vienna at the Academy of Fine Arts Vienna and also in Munich, Germany, with Carl von Marr.

She was the wife of the Austrian zoologist Berthold Hatschek (1854–1941) and the sister of the pianist Moriz Rosenthal.

The Hatschek home was looted and destroyed in 1938 by Nazis, and most of the family's possessions were destroyed, including many of Marie's paintings. The Hatschek daughters were able to escape to America in 1939, taking Marie's surviving work with them, but neither Marie nor Berthold Hatschek were able to leave Europe.

Hatschek-Rosenthal died in 1942 in the Banjica concentration camp in what is now Belgrade, Serbia.

== Gallery ==
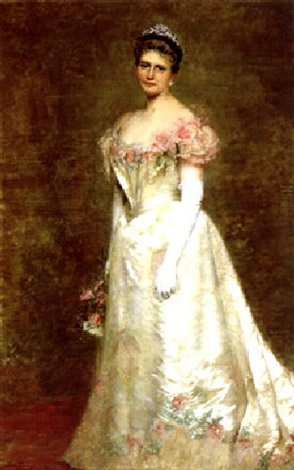
Archduchess Maria Josepha, Mother of Emperor Charles I of Austria, 1900

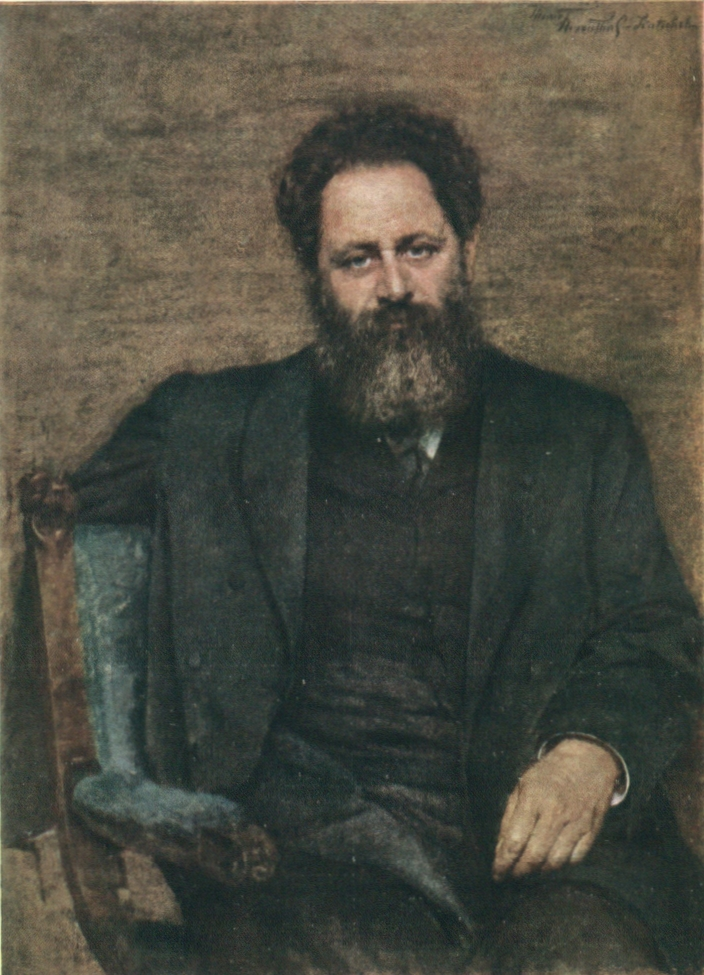
Berthold Hatschek, before 1913

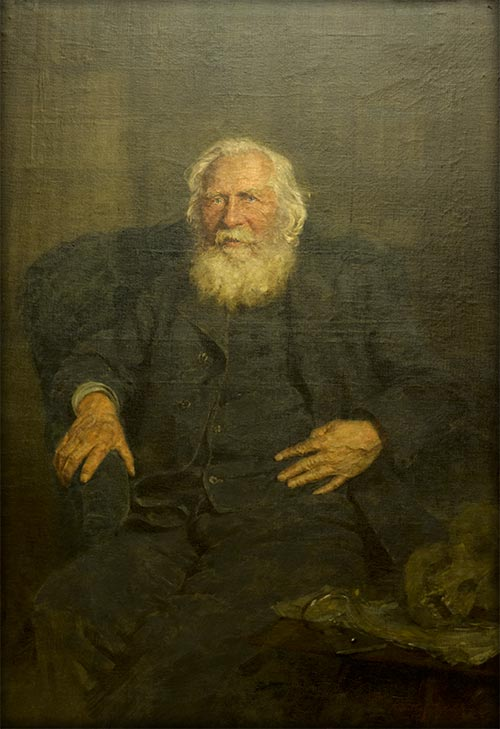
Ernst Haeckel, 1911/1915

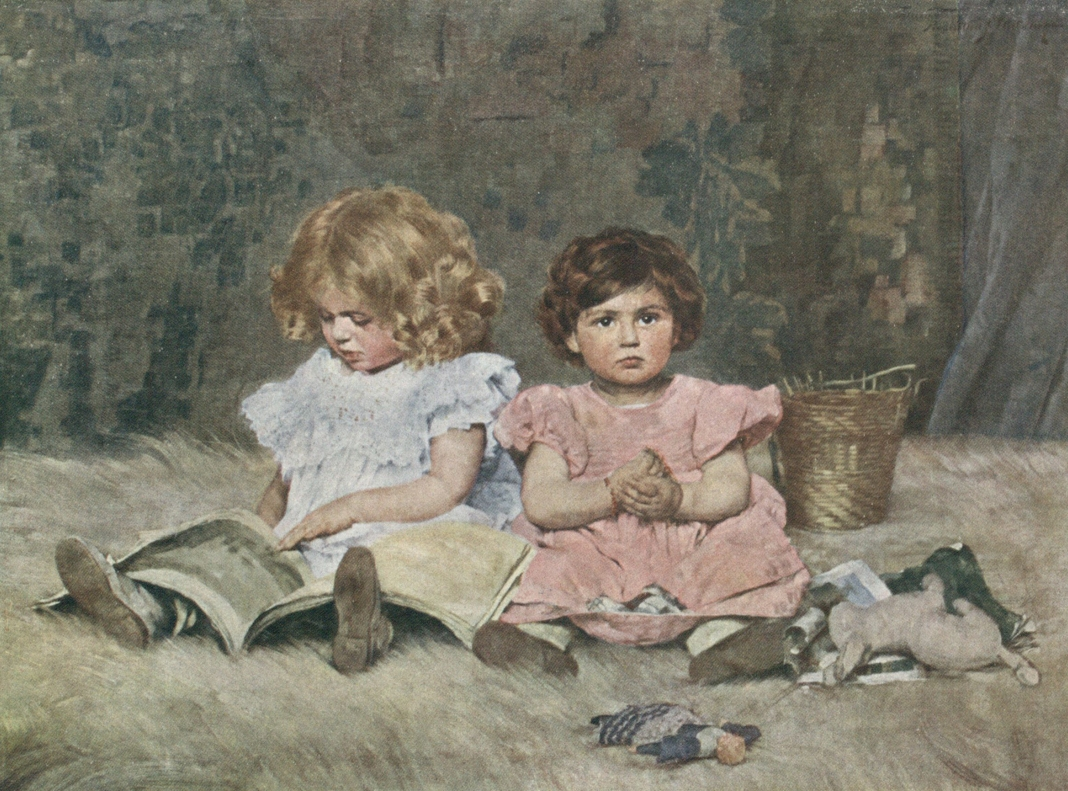
Gusti und Anni, c. 1902

== See also ==
- List of Austrian women artists
- List of painters from Austria
- List of people from Lviv
