= Skrbeň =

- Municipality
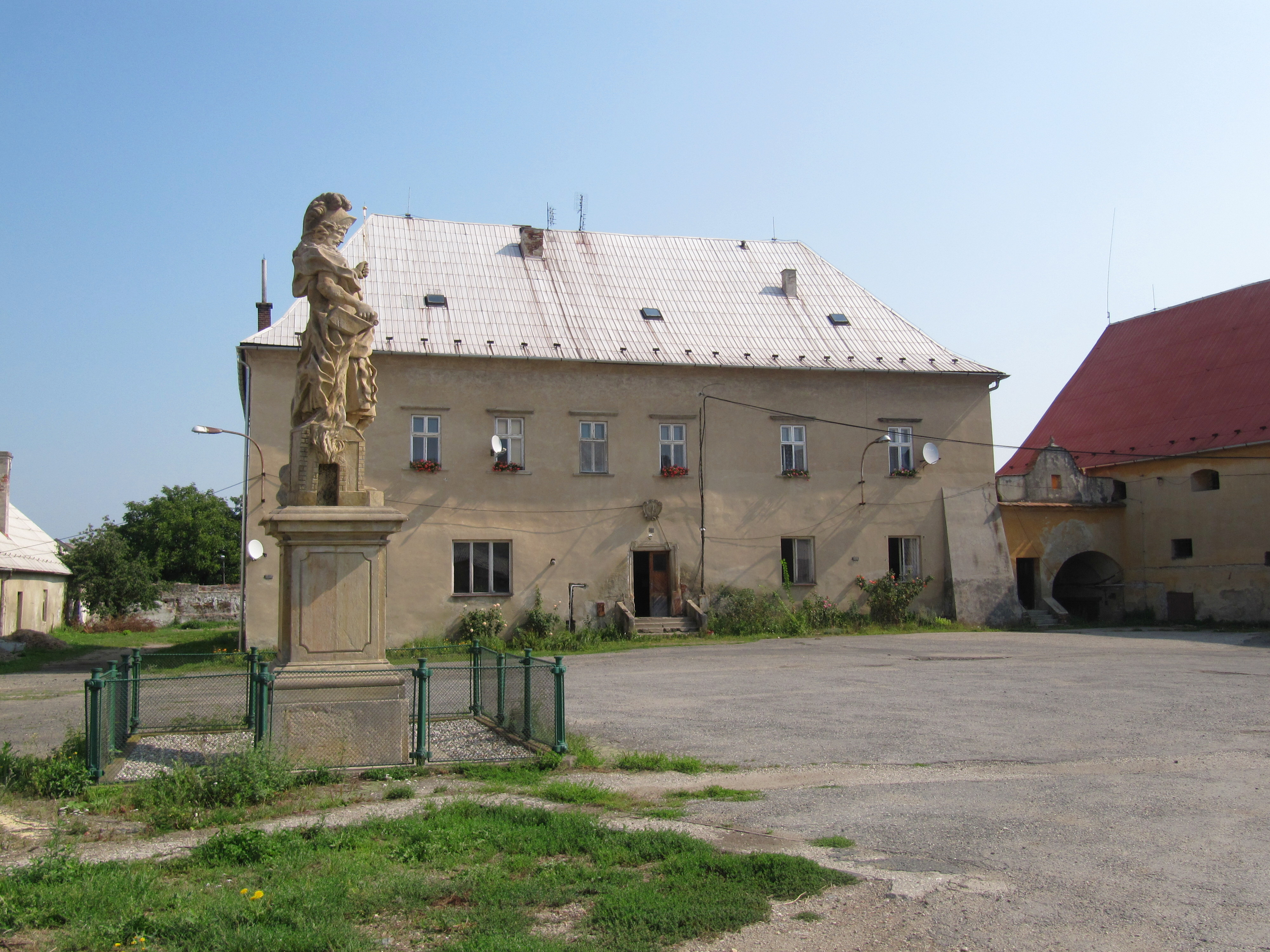
- Skrbeň Fortress

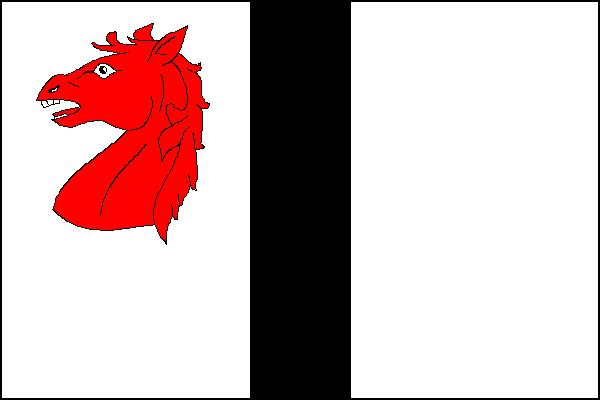
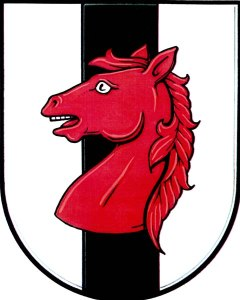
- Flag Coat of arms

- Location in the Czech Republic
- Coordinates: 49°38′28″N 17°10′36″E
- Country: Czech Republic
- Region: Olomouc
- District: Olomouc
- First mentioned: 1174

Area
  - Total: 7.88 km^{2} (3.04 sq mi)
- Elevation: 224 m (735 ft)

Population (2026-01-01)
  - Total: 1,158
  - Density: 147/km^{2} (381/sq mi)
- Time zone: UTC+1 (CET)
  - Summer (DST): UTC+2 (CEST)
- Postal code: 783 35
- Website: www.skrben.cz

Skrbeň is a municipality and village in Olomouc District in the Olomouc Region of the Czech Republic. It has about 1,200 inhabitants.

Skrbeň lies approximately 8 kilometres (5 mi) north-west of Olomouc and 204 km (127 mi) east of Prague.

== Demographics ==
Historical population
Year	Pop.	±%
1869	760	—
1880	757	−0.4%
1890	820	+8.3%
1900	913	+11.3%
1910	1,000	+9.5%
1921	969	−3.1%
1930	994	+2.6%
1950	904	−9.1%
1961	1,015	+12.3%
1970	1,134	+11.7%
1980	1,122	−1.1%
1991	983	−12.4%
2001	1,038	+5.6%
2011	1,141	+9.9%
2021	1,116	−2.2%
Source: Censuses

== Notable people ==
- Berthold Hatschek (1854–1941), Austrian zoologist
