= Lviv National Music Academy =

Conservatory in Lviv, Ukraine

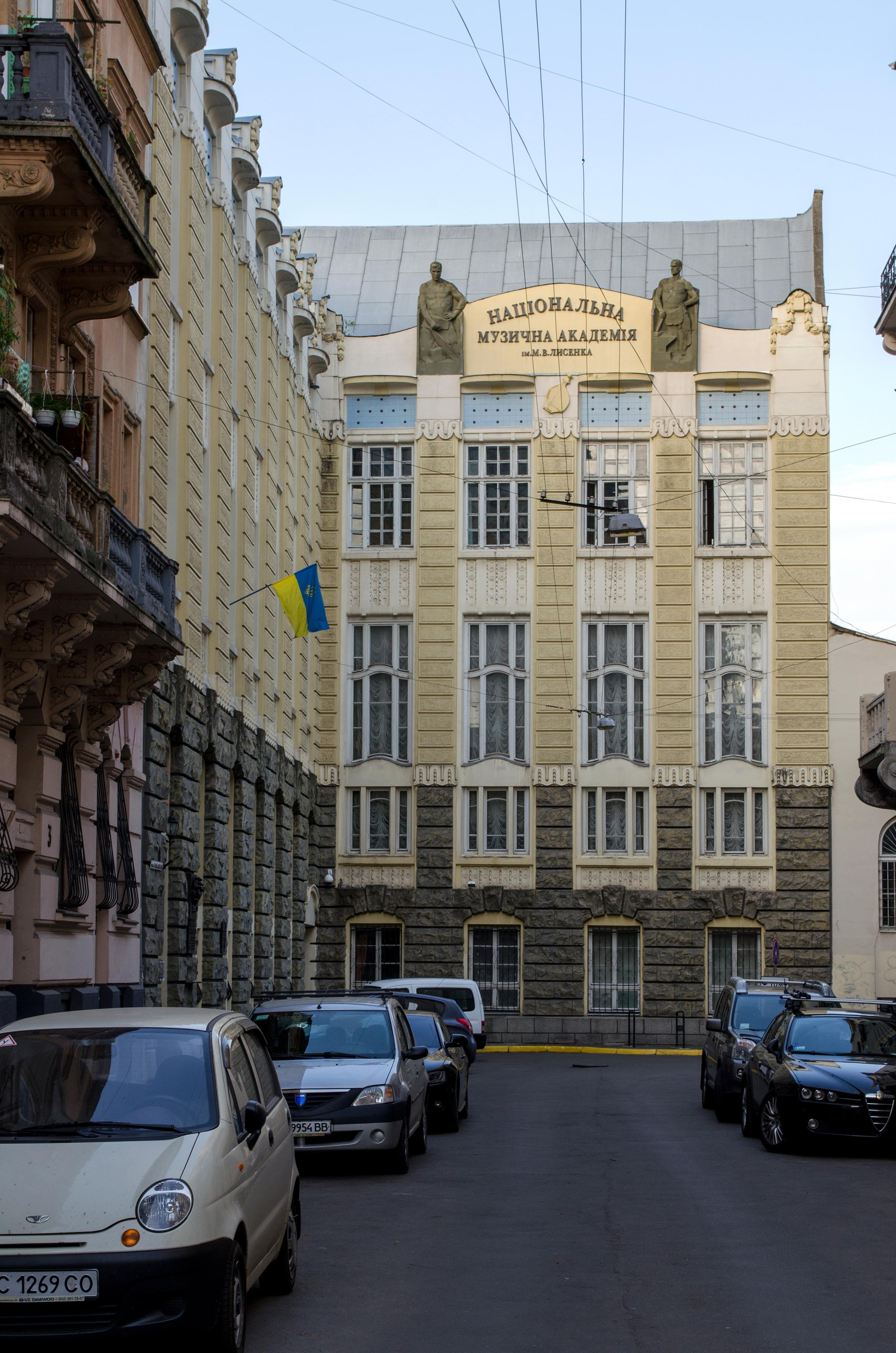
- Established: 1854
- Accreditation: Ministry of Education and Science of Ukraine
- Website: Official website

The Mykola Lysenko Lviv National Music Academy (Ukrainian: Львівська національна музична академія імені Миколи Лисенка), or informally Lviv Conservatory, is a national musical institution of higher education in Lviv, Ukraine.

== History ==
The LNMA Mykola Lysenko traces its origins to earlier music institutions in Lviv, going back to the 19th century, when Franz Xaver Mozart created the Saint Cecilia Society.

In 1838, the first music society of Lviv was created under the name of Society for Teaching of Music in Galicia (German: Gesellschaft zur Beförderung der Musik in Galizien). This by 1848 had become the Galician Music Society. In 1854, the society opened its Music Conservatory. Its first director was a pianist and composer Karol Mikuli, a pupil of Chopin, and in different years among the teachers were Ludwig Marek, Mieczysław Sołtys, his son Adam Sołtys, Henryk Melcer-Szczawiński, Józef Koffler, Ludomir Różycki, Vilém Kurz, Jan Gall, Wilhelm Stengel, Bronisław von Poźniak and others. The list of alumni includes some of the most renowned musicians of the 19th and the early 20th century Central Europe. Among them were composers Zdzisław Jachimecki, Vasyl Barvinsky, and Roman Palester; pianists such as Moritz Rosenthal, Mieczysław Horszowski, Raoul Koczalski, Stefan Askenase, and Aleksander Michałowski; and singers such as Adam Didur (bass), Solomiya Krushelnytska (soprano), Aleksander Myszuga (tenor), Marcelina Sembrich (coloratura soprano). Among the notable graduates were also Irena Anders, Olga Drahonowska-Małkowska, Henryk Mikolasch, Zofia Terné, and Ida Fink.

As the education in most institutions of higher education in Austro-Hungarian Galicia was carried out mostly in Polish and German languages, in 1903 the Ukrainian minority of Lviv founded a separate Higher Musical Institute of Mykola Lysenko (Ukrainian: Вищий музичний інститут ім. М. В. Лисенка). Its teachers included Stanyslav Lyudkevych and Vasyl Barvinsky, and among the students were Roman Sawycky, Daria Gordinskaya-Karanovich, and Galina Levitskaya.

Simultaneously, the Galician Music Society continued to exist and prosper, and soon was renamed to the Polish Music Society in Lviv. Its conservatory, financing the society's daily operations, moved to a new building at Chorążczyzny Street (presently occupied by the Lviv Regional Philharmonic). Partially thanks to the Society's teachers, in 1911 the Lviv University opened a faculty of musicology, led by musicologist Adolf Chybiński. During World War I, the conservatory continued to function, but the Russian occupation of the city forced most of its students and teachers into a brief exile. A short-lived branch of the Polish Music Society was opened in Vienna. After the war, both Polish and Ukrainian societies continued to coexist until 1939. Following the joint Nazi and Soviet invasion of Poland, the city had been occupied by the Soviet Union. Both societies were merged with the University's faculty of musicology into a new Lviv State Conservatory, M.V. Lysenko (Russian: Львовская государственная консерватория им. Н. В. Лысенко).

Following the war, the city was permanently annexed by the Soviet Union, and the conservatory continued to exist in a building formerly occupied by Academy of Foreign Trade in Lwów. However, after 1944 most of its Polish teachers and students were expelled, forced to emigrate and continued their careers in post-war Poland or abroad. Likewise, some Ukrainian teachers of the Higher Music Institute continued activities in exile in New York, from 1947, under the leadership of Roman Sawycky (1907–1960), creating the Ukrainian Music Institute of America.

After the war, teachers in Lviv included Vsevolod Zaderatsky. Since 1992 the conservatory had been called Higher State Music Institute. M.V. Lysenko and was changed in 2000 to Lviv State Musical Academy M.V. Lysenko. On September 13, 2007, Ukrainian President Viktor Yushchenko signed a decree conferring the national status on the Lviv State Music Academy.

Recent and current teachers at LNMA include: composers Mykola Kolessa, Myroslav Skoryk, conductor Yuri Lutsiv, Maria Boyko, organist Vladimir Ignatenko, professor of singing Igor Kushpler, violinist Lydia Shutko, director Igor Pilatyuk, pianist Oleg Krishtalsky, pianist Maria Krushelnytska, pianist Josef Ermin, pianist Ethella Chuprik, and others.

== Directors ==
- Karol Mikuli
- Mieczyslaw Soltys (1899–1929)
- Adam Soltys (1929–1939)

== Notable teachers ==
- Hadzhera Avidzba, Abkhazia's first professional pianist
- Alexander Eidelmann
- Volodymyr Flys, choral composer
- Halyna Levytska
- Alexander Kozarenko
- Vilem Kurz
- Lidiya Shutko
- Stanislav Lyudkevich
- Stefania Pavlyshyn

== Notable Lviv Conservatory alumni ==
- Marcella Sembrich 1858–1935, soprano
- Moritz Rosenthal 1862–1946, pianist
- Solomiya Krushelnytska 1872–1952, soprano
- Bertha Kalich 1874–1939, actress
- Raoul Koczalski 1884–1948, pianist
- Vasyl Barvinsky 1888–1963, composer
- Josef Munclinger 1888–1954, Czech bass singer
- Eduard Steuermann 1892–1964, pianist
- Stefan Askenase 1896–1985, pianist
- Irena Turkevycz-Martynec 1899–1983 soprano
- Roman Palester 1907–1989, Polish composer
- Walter V. Bozyk 1908–1991, bandura player
- Joseph Beer 1908–1987, composer of operettas
- Maria Kryvko b. 1946, composer and teacher
- Volodymyr Ivasyuk 1949–1979, composer
- Igor Matsiyevsky b. 1941, pedagogue
- Oksana Bilozir b. 1957, Ukrainian pop-singer and political activist
- Roman Yakub b. 1958, electronic composer in USA
- Taras Chubay b. 1970, Ukrainian pop-singer
- Ruslana b. 1973, Ukrainian pop-singer, Eurovision Song Contest winner
- Nataliya Polovynka, b. 1965, singer and actress
- Bohdana Frolyak, b. 1968, composer
- Hanna Havrylets, b. 1958, composer
- Ludmila Anatolievna Yaroshevskaya 1906–1975, composer
- Zhou Shen, b. 1992, Chinese singer and vocalist

== See also ==
List of universities in Ukraine
