= Berthold Hatschek =

Austrian zoologist (1854–1941)

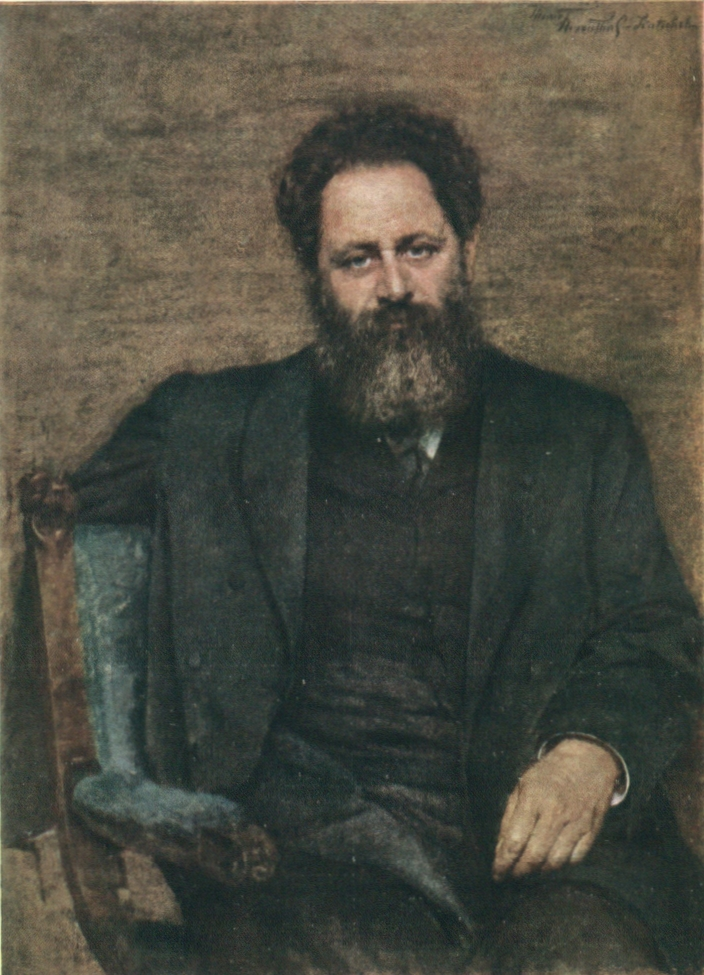
- A portrait of Hatschek c. 1913 by his wife
- Born: April 3, 1854; Skrbeň, Austrian Empire
- Died: January 18, 1941 (aged 86); Vienna, Austria
- Education: University of Leipzig
- Spouse: Marie Rosenthal-Hatschek
- Children: 2
- Scientific career
- Fields: Zoology
- Workplaces: Charles University in Prague, University of Vienna

Berthold Hatschek (3 April 1854 in Skrbeň – 18 January 1941 in Vienna) was an Austrian zoologist remembered for embryological and morphological studies of invertebrates.

== Life ==
Berthold Hatschek studied zoology in Vienna under Carl Claus (1835–1899), and in Leipzig with Rudolf Leuckart (1822–1898). He gained his doctorate at the University of Leipzig with a dissertation titled Beiträge zur Entwicklungsgeschichte der Lepidopteren. Hatschek was deeply influenced by the works of Ernst Haeckel (1834–1919). In 1885 he was appointed professor of zoology at Charles University in Prague, and from 1896 was a professor and director of the second zoological institute at the University of Vienna. Hatschek suffered from severe depression, which greatly affected his work in the latter stages of his life.

Hatschek is remembered for his "trochophore theory", in which he explains the trochophore to be the larval form of a hypothetical organism- the "trochozoon" (which in adult form corresponded to a trochophore-like rotifer, and was the suggested common ancestor of almost all bilaterian animal lifeforms).

In 1888 he split Frey and Leuckart's Coelenterata into three phyla: Spongiaria, Cnidaria and Ctenophora. From his research of lancelets (amphioxus), the anatomical terms "Hatschek's pit" and "Hatschek's nephridium" are derived.

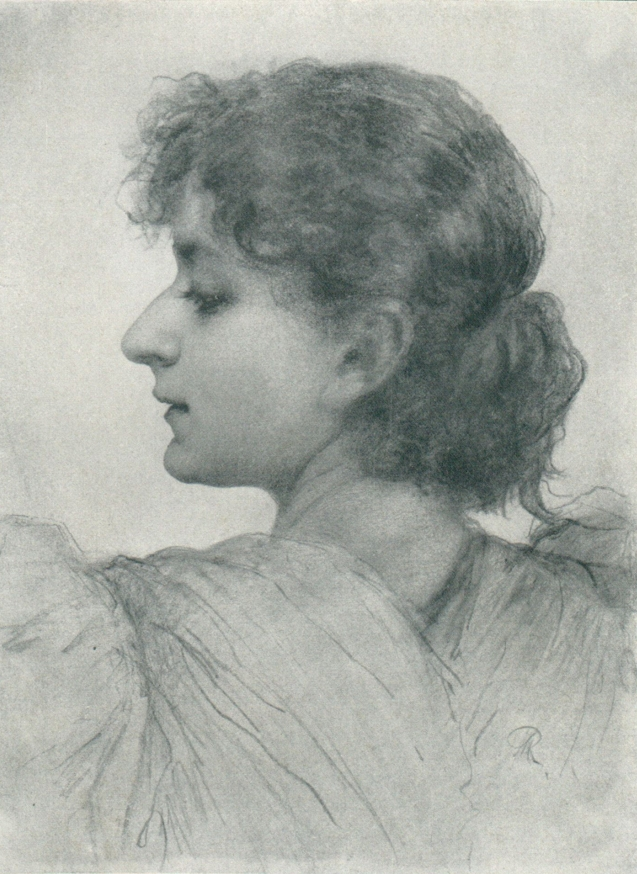
Hatschek's wife, Marie

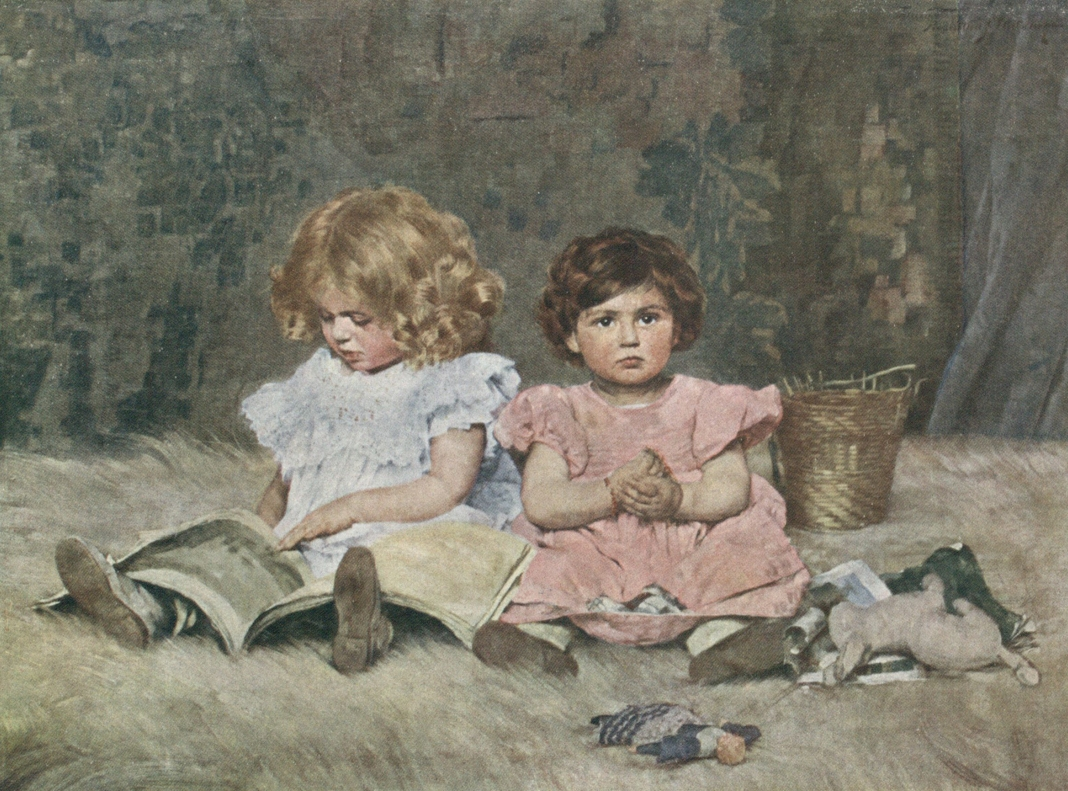
Hatschek's daughters, Gusti and Anni

In 1898 he married the artist Marie Rosenthal. They had two daughters, Gusti and Anni.

The Hatschek home was looted and destroyed in 1938 by Nazis, and most of the family's possessions were destroyed, including many of Marie's paintings. The Hatschek daughters were able to escape to America in 1939, taking Marie's surviving work with them, but neither Marie nor Berthold Hatschek were able to leave Europe.

Hatschek died on January 18, 1941 in Vienna, Austria. Marie Rosenthal-Hatschek died the following year in the Banjica concentration camp in what is now Belgrade, Serbia.

== Selected writings ==
- Studien über Entwicklungsgeschichte der Anneliden. Ein Beitrag zur Morphologie der Bilaterien, 1878.
- Studien über entwicklung des Amphioxus, 1881.
- Lehrbuch der Zoologie : eine morphologische Übersicht des Thierreiches zur Einführung in das Studium dieser Wissenschaft, 1888.
- "The Amphioxus and its development", translated into English, 1893.
- Das acromerit des Amphioxus, 1906.
- Das neue Zoologische System, 1911.
