= Hatschek's pit =

Anatomical structure in lancelets

In the lancelet, Hatschek's pit, not to be confused with Hatschek's nephridium, is a deep ciliated fossa on the dorsal midline of the buccal cavity (the region of the gut behind the mouth). Among other things, it secretes mucus which entraps food particles from the water. It is named after Berthold Hatschek, an Austrian zoologist who worked on the lancelet.
