= Maria Kryvko =

Ukrainian musician (born 1946)

- Марія Кривко
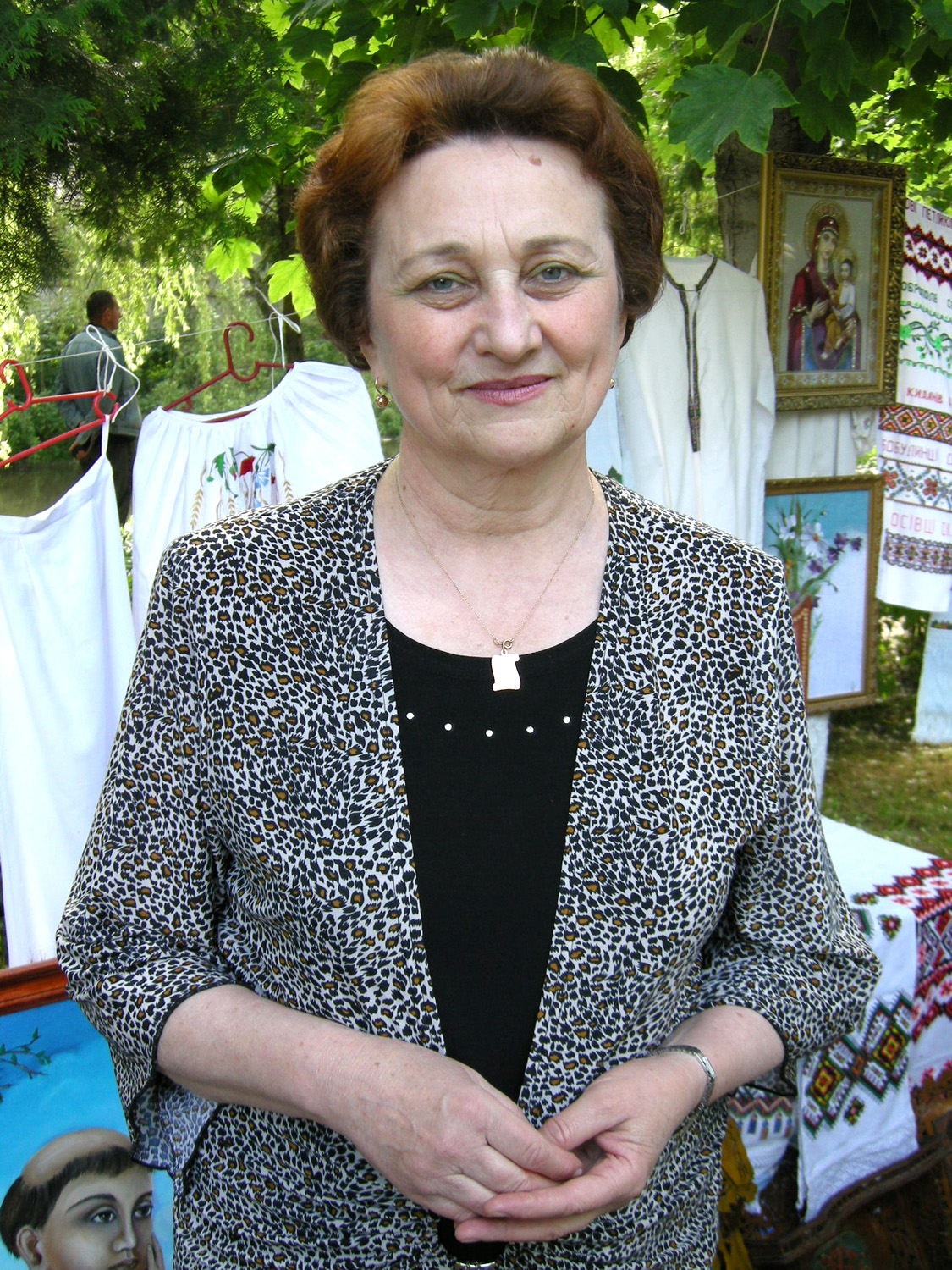
- Maria in 2008
- Born: 12 November 1946 (age 79); Verbivka, Ternopil Oblast, Ukrainian SSR, Soviet Union
- Education: Lviv National Music Academy
- Occupations: Musician, conductor and teacher
- Honours: Merited Culture Worker of Ukraine

Maria Ivanivna Kryvko (Ukrainian: Марія Іванівна Кривко; born 12 November 1946) is a Ukrainian musician, conductor and teacher who was awarded the Merited Culture Worker of Ukraine in 2006.

== Early life and education ==
Born on 12 November 1946, in Verbivka, Borshchiv Raion, Ternopil Oblast, Maria attended Verbiv School for her early schooling before transferring to Skala-Podilska High School. She demonstrated her musical ability as a soloist in the student four-voice choir throughout her stay at the high school. Her interest in music inspired her to seek professional study, which culminated in her 1967 graduation from the conductor and choral department of the S. A. Krushelnytska-named Ternopil Music School. At the Lviv National Music Academy, where she studied and received her degree in 1985.

== Career ==
Maria was asked to join the Bukovinian Song and Dance Ensemble at the Chernivtsi Philharmonic Hall by Andriy Kushnirenko. She is the choir director at Buchach Communal Music School, and has devoted her career to developing musical talent since 1967. She also teaches vocal and solfeggio. From 1985 to the present day, she has held the position of director at this institution. Notably, she is recognized for her contributions to Ukrainian music, having authored approximately 100 adaptations of folk songs and compositions by Ukrainian composers.

== Awards ==
Maria is known to have earned the following recognitions and awards:

- "Person of the Year" in Buchach Raion in the nomination "Artist of the Year" (2000)
- Diploma of the Ministry of Culture of Ukraine
- Merited Culture Worker of Ukraine (2006)
