= Otakar Šín =

Czech composer and musicologist (1881–1943)

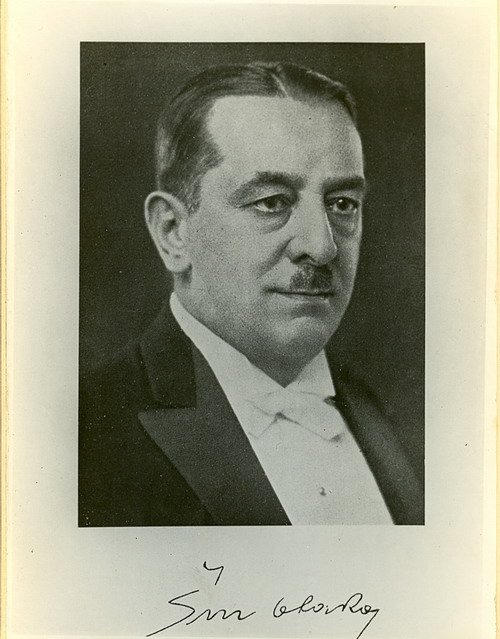
- Born: 23 April 1881; Rokytno, Austria-Hungary
- Died: 21 January 1943 (aged 61); Prague, Czechoslovakia
- Education: Prague Conservatoire
- Occupations: Czech music composer; Theoretician; Pedagogue
- Years active: 1910s–1940s
- Spouse: Libuše Ichová

Otakar Šín (23 April 1881 – 21 January 1943) was a Czech composer, theoretician and pedagogue.

== Biography ==
Otakar was born in the village of Rokytno (today part of Nové Město na Moravě), where his father was an innkeeper; he later moved to Fryšava pod Žákovou horou. Otakar took his first musical lessons from educator and forester František Dušek, who taught him the violin for five years, and the piano for a year. His father doubted his son's talent and sent him to the Higher Industrial School in Brno, where Otakar failed in the second year. So he started to learn brewing in Nové Město na Moravě. After training, he became a brewer in the brewery in Maffersdorf near Liberec (today Vratislavice nad Nisou). In the brewery he started a band, with great success.

During his work in the brewery, he enrolled in the first year of the Prague Conservatory. He studied Pipe organ and composition, where his teachers were Josef Klička and Karel Stecker. He continued to master the piano with Josef Jiránek, and in 1911 he passed the state exam in piano. Then, he taught piano privately, and harmony, and became a choirmaster of the "Škroup" choir. He married Libuši Ichová. In 1919 he became a teacher of theoretical subjects at the Conservatory. A year later in 1920, he was appointed a professor of theory at the Conservatory. One of his students was Stefania Turkewich.

His composer's work is based on the music of Vítězslav Novák and Josef Suk. Studying the scores of these masters led him to the theoretical problems of harmony in 20th century music. He produced several theoretical writings in which he published significant theoretical discoveries, the textbooks Uplná nauka o harmonii na základĕ melodie a rytmu (A Complete Harmony Course on the Basis of Melody and Rhythm; 1922; 6th ed., rev., 1949), Nauka o kontrapunktit, imitaci a fuge (Counterpoint, Imitation and Fugue; 1936; second ed., 1945), and Všeobecná nauka o hudbé (A General Music Course; 1949; completed by F. Bartoš and K. Janeček).

For his theoretical and musical work he was elected a full member of the Czech Academy of Sciences and Art in 1928 and twice won the State Prize (1930 and 1937). He died in Prague on 21 January 1943. He was buried in the Fryšava cemetery.

== Compositions ==
ORCH.: 2 symphonic poems: Tillotama (1908) and King Menkera (1916–18); Radio Overture (1936); 3 CzechDances for Orch. (1939; also for Nonet). CHAMBER: 2 string quartets (1923; 1926–28); Cello Sonata (1934); Small Suite for Violin and Piano (1937); Hunting, festive greeting for Horns (1938); numerous piano pieces. VOCAL: Choruses; songs.

== Bibliography ==
- Československý hudební slovník osob a institucí II. (M–Ž), 1965, Státní hudební vydavatelství, Praha
- Český biografický slovník XX. století. 3. díl, Q-Ž. Praha 1999
- Šlechtová, A. - Levora, J.: Členové České akademie věd a umění 1890-1952. Praha 2004
