= Moriz Rosenthal =

Polish pianist and composer (1862–1946)

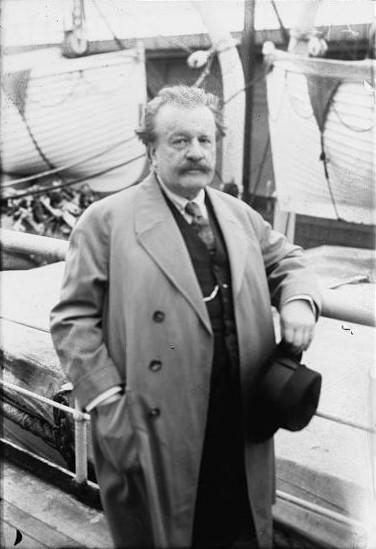
- Born: December 17, 1862; Lemberg, Austrian Empire
- Died: September 3, 1946 (aged 83); New York City, U.S.
- Education: University of Vienna
- Occupation: Musician
- Years active: 1870s–1940s
- Relatives: Marie Rosenthal-Hatschek (sister)

Moriz Rosenthal (17 December 1862 – 3 September 1946) was a Polish pianist and composer. He was an outstanding pupil of Franz Liszt and a friend and colleague of some of the greatest musicians of his age, including Johannes Brahms, Johann Strauss, Anton Rubinstein, Hans von Bülow, Camille Saint-Saëns, Jules Massenet and Isaac Albéniz.

== Biography ==
Rosenthal was born in Lemberg, Austrian Empire into a Jewish family, where his father was professor at the chief academy. At eight years of age he commenced his piano studies under Galoth (1869–1872). His sister was the painter Marie Rosenthal-Hatschek.

In 1872, Rosenthal became a pupil of Karol Mikuli, Chopin's pupil and editor, who trained him along more academic lines at Lviv Conservatory. At the age of twelve he became a pupil of Rafael Joseffy in Vienna. His debut occurred in Vienna in 1876. He had immediate success and after a tour of Romania he was made Court Pianist of Romania when he was fourteen years of age. From 1878 to 1879 he studied with Liszt at Weimar and Rome. He was associated with the great Hungarian master until 1886, when Liszt died in Bayreuth. Having the conviction that a well-rounded classical education was necessary in his work as an interpreter, he studied at the Staats Gymnasium in Vienna and at the University, where he was a pupil in philosophy under Von Zimmerman and Franz Brentano and in esthetics under Eduard Hanslick. His virtuosity guided by a probing intellect was nonpareil. In 1912 he was made Kammervirtuoso for the Emperor of Austria.

As Liszt's pupil, Rosenthal made appearances in St. Petersburg, Paris, and elsewhere. His general education, however, was not neglected, and in 1880 Rosenthal qualified to take the philosophical course at the University of Vienna. Six years later he resumed his career with the piano, achieving brilliant success in Leipzig, and in Boston, where he made his U.S. debut in 1888, and subsequently in England in 1895. He taught at the Curtis Institute of Music from 1926–1928. From 1939, he taught in his own piano school in New York City, where he died in 1946.

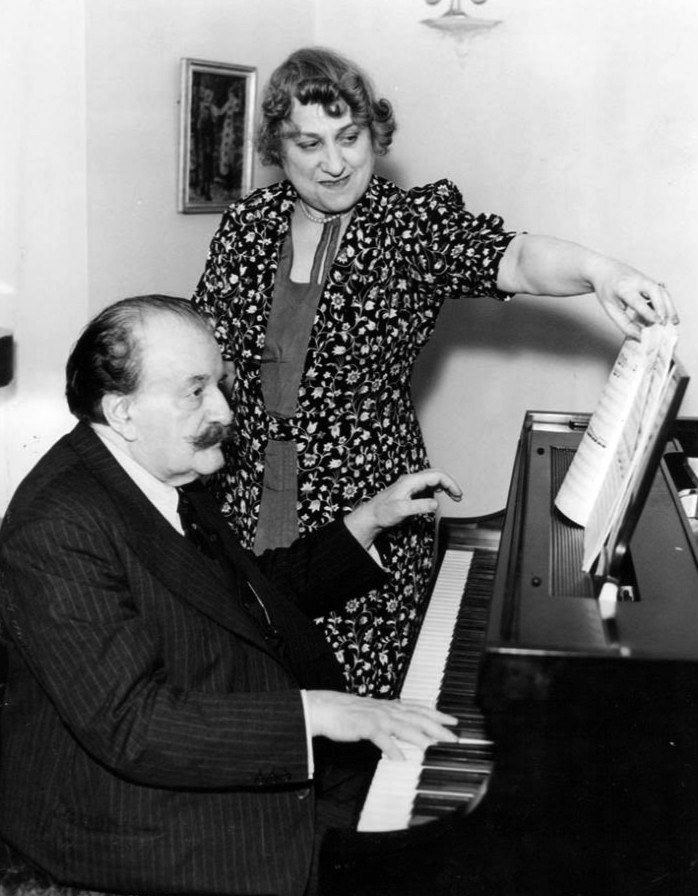
Rosenthal as he prepared for a Chicago Grant Park concert in 1938. His wife, Hedwig Kanner-Rosenthal, was also an accomplished pianist.

Rosenthal recorded around three hours' worth of music between 1928 and 1942, for Columbia, Edison, Ultraphon, EMI, and RCA Victor. Several of the discs are often regarded as among the finest piano recordings from his time. In addition to 78-rpm records, a number of American Piano Company (Ampico) piano rolls also exist.

Rosenthal's usually malicious wit was legendary. When he heard Vladimir Horowitz blaze through the octave passages of Tchaikovsky's First Piano Concerto at his Vienna debut, he remarked: "He is an Octavian, but not Caesar." In similar vein, after hearing Ignacy Jan Paderewski, whose reputation had preceded him, Rosenthal said: "Yes, he plays well, I suppose, but he's no Paderewski". A colleague once played Rosenthal's arrangement of Chopin's Minute Waltz in thirds at a recital, after which Rosenthal thanked the pianist "for the most enjoyable quarter of an hour of my life". Towards the end of his life Rosenthal lived at the Great Northern Hotel in New York, which he referred to as "more Northern than Great".

His pupils included Charles Rosen, Robert Goldsand, and Jorge Bolet. An anthology of Rosenthal's autobiographical writings was published as Moriz Rosenthal: In Word and Music (ed. Mark Mitchell, Allan Evans. Indiana University Press, 2006), which also contains a CD of representative and unpublished recordings.
