= Roman Yakub =

Roman Yakub (born 1958) is a composer who received his early musical training in Lviv, Ukraine. He graduated from Lviv Conservatory in 1982 with a diploma in Music Composition. In 1991, he moved to the United States, where he earned a master's degree in music composition at the University of Massachusetts Amherst and a Doctor of Musical Arts Degree in composition at Boston University., In 2006, he won First Prize in the Ithaca College Choral Composition Competition for "Wynken, Blynken, and Nod" ("Dutch Lullaby"). In 1997, Yakub became a runner-up in the ALEA III International Composition Competition.

In 2003, Roman Yakub received a National Telly Award for the music to the TV commercial promoting a new concert venue for the Memphis Symphony Orchestra. He was also a recipient of the ASCAP annual Composer Award (2002-2010) and fellow of the MacDowell Colony (2000).

Yakub's music has been performed in the US and Europe. His music has been commissioned by the Wiedikon Orchestra (Zurich, Switzerland), New York City festivals "Bridge" and "Bachanalia", University of Massachusetts, Lviv Philharmonic Orchestra, and by numerous theater and TV companies. He was a faculty member at Boston University, Amherst College, Hampshire College, and Voronezh Academy of Arts among others. Yakub's music is published by Santa Barbara Music Publishing

== Discography ==
- Tea Ceremonies Music (Emergency Exit, Moscow 2004)
- Opium Ceremonies Music (Emergency Exit, Moscow 2004)
