= Nadiia Nikitenko =

Ukrainian historian (born 1944)

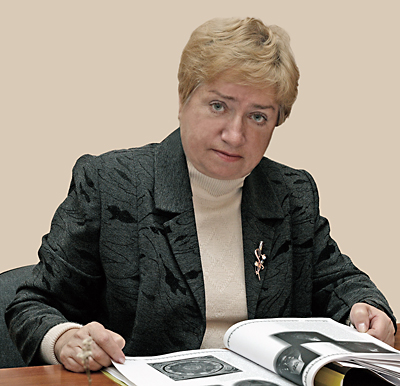
- Born: Nadiia Mykolaiivna Zavorotna; 1944 (age 81–82); Kyiv, Ukrainian SSR
- Occupation: historian
- Known for: Research of Saint Sophia Cathedral

Nadiia Mykolaiivna Nikitenko (Ukrainian: Надія Миколаївна Нікітенко; born 2 December 1944) is a Ukrainian historian, culturalist, museologist, doctor of historical sciences (2003), researcher of Saint Sophia Cathedral, professor (2005), and Merited Culture Worker of Ukraine (2009).

== Early life and education ==
Nadiia Nikitenko was born in the family of Mykola Kyrylovych Zavorotny, an honored football coach of Ukraine. Her mother, Zapryvoda (Dossi) Ludmila Ovsiivna, comes from Pontic Greeks (Romans) and Zaporozhian Cossacks. Nikitenko studied at High School No. 19 in Kirovohrad, then at High School No. 2 in Rivne, and graduated from High School No. 5 in Cherkasy.

In 1968, Nikitenko graduated from the history faculty of Kyiv University.

== Career ==
From 1968 to 1977, Nikitenko worked as a research assistant in the museums of Kerch and Kryvyi Rih, and as the responsible secretary of the board of the Kerch city organization of the Ukrainian Society for the Protection of Historical and Cultural Monuments. Since December 1977, she has worked in scientific positions at the Sophia Kyiv National Nature Reserve.

In 1993, Nikitenko defended her candidate's thesis Historical problems in the frescoes of Sophia of Kyiv (Institute of Universal History of the Russian Academy of Sciences, Moscow, scientific supervisor, Academician of the Russian Academy of Sciences Gennadii Lytavrin), and in 2002 - a doctoral dissertation Rus-Ukraine and Byzantium in the monumental complex of Sophia of Kyiv: historical, social and ethnic-confessional aspects (Institute of Ukrainian Archeography and Source Studies named after Mykhailo Hrushevsky, National Academy of Sciences of Ukraine, Kyiv).

Nikitenko taught the history and culture of Byzantium, Kyivan Rus, medieval Ukraine, and Kyiv at the National University "Kyiv-Mohyla Academy" (1994-2006), as well as museum studies at the Kyiv National University of Culture and Arts (1997-2002). She raised many young scientists.

Nikitenko many years researched Sophia of Kyiv as a phenomenon of spiritual culture and a unique historical source. She discovered and comprehensively substantiated the fact of the emergence of Sophia in 1011-1018, at the end of the reigns of the baptizer of Russia Volodymyr the Great and his son Yaroslav the Wise.

This dating, which received significant public resonance and the support of many scientists, became the basis for celebrating the 1000th anniversary of Sophia.

In September 2011, according to the decision of the 35th session of the UNESCO General Conference (October 2009) and according to the Decree of the President of Ukraine dated June 11, 2010, the 1000th anniversary of the founding of Sophia of Kyiv was solemnly celebrated at the international and national levels. For the first time, Nikitenko put forward and substantiated the hypothesis about the 1000th anniversary of the Golden Gate with the gateway church and defensive earthen rampart, which arose simultaneously with Sophia of Kyiv as integral parts of a single urban planning complex, conceived and started by Volodymyr and completed by Yaroslav.

In June 2012, Nikitenko was forced to temporarily leave the Sophia Nature Reserve due to the repressive actions of its new management. Since May 2015, she has been working at the reserve again, heading the research department of the Saint Sophia Institute.

== Awards and honors ==
Nikitenko holds state, church, and social awards. On 12 May 2009, she was awarded the title Merited Culture Worker of Ukraine for a significant personal contribution to the preservation of monuments of the history and culture of Ukraine and many years of conscientious work in the field of museum development.

Among other awards:

- Honorable Mention of the Ministry of Culture and Arts of Ukraine "For Achievements in the Development of Culture and Art" (2004)
- Order of Venerable Agapit Pecherskyi (2007)
- Order of the Holy Great Martyr Barbara II degree of the Ukrainian Orthodox Church (2011)
- Order of Queen Anna "Honor of the Fatherland" (2010; 2021),
- Gold Medal of the Ministry of Culture of the Republic of Armenia "For Contribution to the Development of Armenian-Ukrainian Cultural Relations" (2016).

== Personal life ==
Nikitenko’s husband, Mykhailo Mykhailovych Nikitenko, born in 1941, is a historian-archaeologist. Her daughter, Maryana Mykhaylivna Nikitenko, born in 1968, is a candidate of science in science, museum worker, and researcher of the Kyiv-Pechersk Lavra.

== Selected works ==
Nadiia Nikitenko is the author of more than 30 monographs and books, and more than 300 articles.

- Saint Sophia of Kyiv: a new look at its history, architecture, and painting. (Ottawa, 1996). 98 p.
- Rus and Byzantium in the monumental complex of Sophia of Kyiv: Historical problems. K., 1999. 294 p.
- Saint Sophia Cathedral in Kyiv. K., 2000. 230 p.,
- Saint Sophia of Kyiv: history in art. K., 2003. 334 p.
- From Tsargorod to Kyiv: Anna Porfirorodna; The price of the Kyiv throne. K., 2007. 264 p.
- Saint Sophia of Kyiv. K., 2008. - 384 p.
- Saint Sophia Cathedral in Kyiv. M., 2008. - 272 p.
- From Tsargrad to Kyiv: Anna Porfirorodnaya. Wise or Wicked? To the 1025th anniversary of the baptism of Rus. Kyiv, 2012. (Kyiv-Yerevan, 2015-2017)
- Sofia of Kyiv and its creators: secrets of history. Kamenets-Podolsky, 2014. 248 p.
