= Igor Matsiyevsky =

Russian composer

- Ігор Мацієвський
- Born: 1941 (age 84–85); Kharkiv, Ukrainian SSR, Soviet Union (now Ukraine)
- Occupations: Film music composer, music ethnographer

Igor Vladimirovich Matsiyevsky (Note: Ukrainian: Ігор Володимирович Мацієвський, romanized: Ihor Volodymyrovych Matsiievskyi; Russian: Игорь Владимирович Мациевский, romanized: Igor Vladimirovich Matsiyevsky) is a Ukrainian film music composer and music ethnographer.

Matsiyevsky was born in Kharkiv, Ukraine. He completed studies at the Lviv Conservatory, post graduate studies in composition at the Leningrad Conservatory, and doctorate at the Russian Institute of Culture. He has prepared 5 doctor habitalis and 22 doctorates with graduates specializing in Kazakh, Uzbek, Kyrgiz, Tatar, Azerbaijani, and other cultures. He has authored 4 books and 10 collections of his musical compositions. His compositions include symphonic works and the music to 12 films. He has over 150 publications.

He is head of the Eurasian School of Contemporary Musicology and head of instrumental studies at the Russian Institute for Art History (РИИИ РАН) in Saint Petersburg. Doctor of Art Criticism, academic of the Russian Academy of Sciences, officer of the NGO International Informatization Academy in Moscow. Merited worker of culture of Ukraine and Poland.

== Publications ==
In Ukrainian and Russian:

- 1969 - Про двоподілний принцип композиції в гуцульській народно-інструментальній музиці (Українське музикознавство. #5)
- 1970 - Гуцульские скрипичные композиции: Дис. кан. мис.
- 1972 - Музичні інструменти Закарпатською України (Свидник)
- 1972 - Фольклор и композиторская техника (Баку)
- 1976 - Исследовательськие проблемы транскрипции инструментальной народной муыки
- 1978 - К проблемы эпического в народной инструментальной музыке
- 1983 - Формирование системно-этнофонического метода в органологии
- 1980 – Мациевский И.В. Народный музыкальный инструмент и методология его исследования // Актуальные проблемы современной фольклористики. Л., 1980, с. 143-169.
- 1985 - Троиска музыка: к вопросу традиционных инструментальных ансамблей
- 1987 – Мациевский И.В. Основные проблемы и аспекты изучения народных музыкальных инструментов и инструментальной музыки // Народные музыкальные инструменты и инструментальная музыка. Ч. 1. М., 1987, с. 6-38.
- 1997 - Питання документації народної інструментальної музики.
- 1989 - Питання документації народної інструментальної музики
- 2000 - Жанрові угрупування української традиційної інструментальної музики (Львів)
- 2002 - Ігри і співголосся, Контонація. (Тернопіль)
- 2007 - Народная инструментальная музыка как феномен культуры - Алматы.

== Compositions ==
Film Music:

- 1983 - Believe it or not (ru: Небывальщина).
- 2001 - Tale of Fedot the crossbowman (ru: Сказ про Федота-Стрельца)
- 2007 - Chernobyl (uk: Тернопіль).
