= Honored Culture Worker of Ukraine =

Honorary title in Ukraine

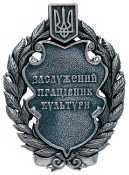
Badge of the Honored Culture Worker of Ukraine

Honored Culture Worker of Ukraine (Ukrainian: Заслужений працівник культури України, romanized: Zasluzhenyi pratsivnyk kultury Ukrainy) is an honorary title of Ukraine awarded by the president of Ukraine under the Ukrainian law "On state Awards of Ukraine." According to the regulations of the honorary rank of Ukraine on June 29, 2001, the title is assigned to:

працівникам культурно-освітніх закладів, театрально-концертних і циркових організацій, редакцій, видавництв, підприємств поліграфії, кінофікації, архівів, охорони пам'яток історії та культури, туристично-екскурсійних установ і організацій, активістам культурологічних громадських організацій і товариств, учасникам професійних та аматорських художніх колективів, іншим працівникам культури за вагомий внесок у розвиток духовної культури, популяризацію у світі культурно-мистецької спадщини України

Employees of cultural and educational institutions, theater and concert and circus organizations, editors, publishers, printing companies, cinematography, archives, historic preservation and cultural tourism and tour agencies and organizations, cultural activists, NGOs and associations members of professional and amateur art groups and other cultural practitioners for contribution to the development of spiritual culture, promotion of the world's cultural and artistic heritage of Ukraine

Persons presented the award should have graduated a higher education or professional technical school.

== Laureates ==
- Tetiana Yakovenko (born 1954), poet, literary critic, teacher
- Nadiia Nikitenko (born 1944), historian, museologist
- Ihor Likhovy (born 1957), diplomat, museologist, historian, culturologist, former Minister of Culture and Tourism
- Maria Kryvko (born 1946), musician, conductor, teacher

== See also ==
- Honorary titles of Ukraine
- List of European art awards
