= Verbivka, Ternopil Oblast =

Verbivka Вербівка
- Village
- Location within Ternopil Oblast Location within Ukraine
- Coordinates: 48°45′16″N 26°14′00″E
- Country: Ukraine
- Oblast: Ternopil Oblast
- District: Borshchiv

Population
  - Total: 187
- Time zone: UTC+2 (EET)
  - Summer (DST): UTC+3 (EEST)
- Postal code: 48726
- Area code: +380 3541

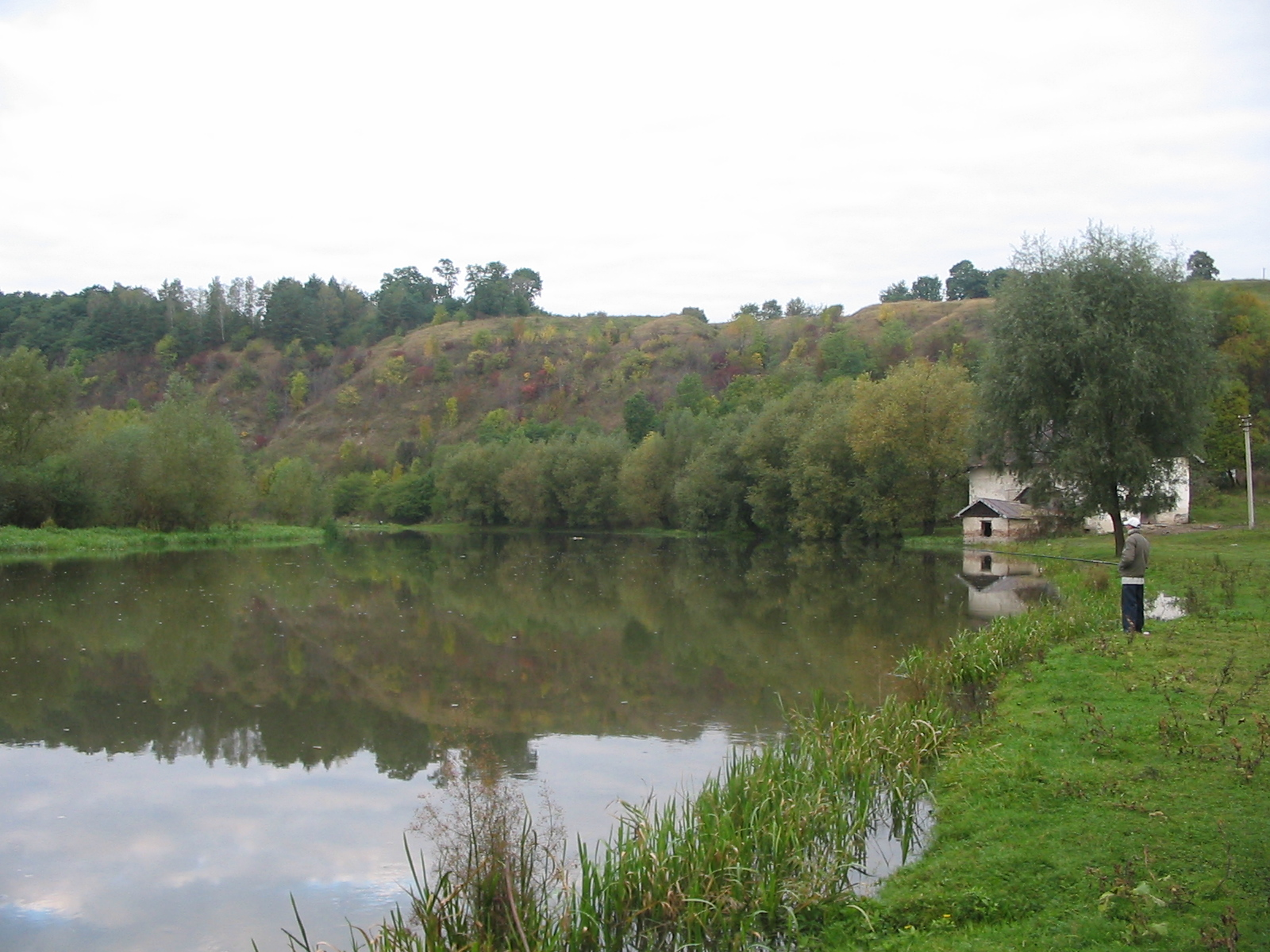
left tributary of the Dniester River. right bank of the Zbruch River near the mill in the village of Verbivtsi, Borshchiv district, Ternopil region.

Verbivka (Ukrainian: Вербівка), is a village located in Chortkiv Raion of Ternopil Oblast in western Ukraine. It belongs to Skala-Podilska settlement hromada, one of the hromadas of Ukraine.

Until 18 July 2020, Verbivka belonged to Borshchiv Raion. The raion was abolished in July 2020 as part of the administrative reform of Ukraine, which reduced the number of raions of Ternopil Oblast to three. The area of Borshchiv Raion was merged into Chortkiv Raion.

== Notable people ==
- Maria Kryvko (born 1946), a musician, composer and teacher
