= Allan Evans (music producer) =

American musicologist and record producer (1956–2020)

Allan Evans (April 4, 1956 – June 6, 2020) was an American musicologist and music producer.

== Biography ==
In 1996, Evans founded the Arbiter Recording Company, which was reformed in 2002 as a non-commercial organization Arbiter of Cultural Traditions, Inc. By 2012, he had produced over 200 recordings about forgotten artists. Evans taught at Mannes College, The New School for Music, New York, and was co-director of the Scuola Italiana del Greenwich Village. He was author of the book Ignaz Friedman: Romantic Master Pianist, and editor of the book Moriz Rosenthal in Word and Music: a Legacy of the Nineteenth Century. Evans also co-authored La Cucina Picena with his wife Beatrice Muzi.

Evans is survived by his widow and their son Stefan.
