= Raoul Koczalski =

Polish pianist and composer

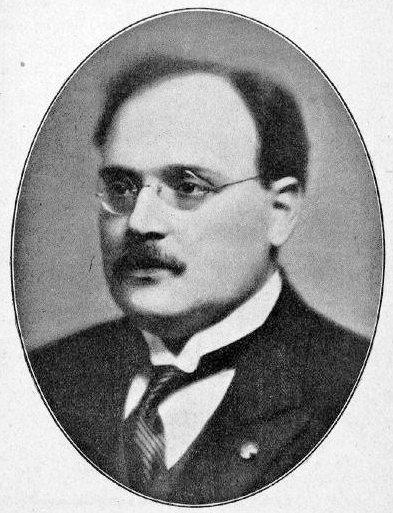
Raoul Koczalski

Raoul Armand Jerzy (von) Koczalski (3 January 1884 – 24 November 1948) was a Polish pianist and composer. He also used the pseudonym Georg Armand(o) Koczalski.

== Biography ==
=== Early years ===
Born in Warsaw, Koczalski was taught first by his mother, then by Julian Gadomski (1888–1890). Having made his first public appearance in 1888 (aged 4), his parents took him to play for Anton Rubinstein, who foresaw the possibility of a performing career. He never studied at a conservatory but had further private lessons on the piano and in composition with Ludwig Marek (1891–1892), Karol Mikuli (1821–1897) (Chopin's favorite Polish student and composer) and instrumentation with Henryk Jarecki (1893–1894). At the age of 7 he gave concerts, and at 9 he was playing in major European cities as a virtuoso. His thousandth concert was given in Leipzig in 1896, and by the age of 12 he had received awards such as the Order of the Lion and Sun (from the Shah of Persia), the title of Court Pianist (from the King of Spain), and a medal from the Turkish Sultan. Already as a child he had a very extensive repertoire. During World War I he was interned in Bad Nauheim, Germany.

Iranian king Naser al-Din Shah Qajar described him as "very mischievous and clever, but played the piano beautifully—it was something extraordinary." The Shah noted that Kouzalski's mother claimed he was "crazy about the piano and played continuously until bedtime." Impressed by his performance, Naser al-Din Shah awarded him a medal and granted him permission to call himself the Shah's pianist.

=== Composer and writer ===
As a composer, Koczalski created numerous works for solo piano, instrumental concertos for various solo instruments with orchestra, works for orchestra, music-dramatic works for the stage, chamber music in various instrumentations, as well as many songs with piano accompaniment. Most of the compositions were published abroad (Germany, Russia, France). Koczalski's compositions are largely forgotten today. Stylistically, they belong to the late romantic period. The great upheavals in the field of contemporary music (atonality, twelve-tone music) that took place during Koczalski's creative period had no influence on his style.

In a book devoted to Chopin, published in 1936, he clearly takes a stand against contemporary music. He considers the experiments of the last 25 years, which sought new paths on a "cerebral, mathematical basis," to have failed, and he calls the representatives of modern music, whom he calls "experimenters, modernists, tinkerers, subversives," "sad ghosts of an even sadder time."

Koczalski's remarks about the character and interpretation of Chopin's music remain valid, although the style of interpretation of many modern pianists no longer corresponds to the tradition of the great Chopin players of the past. Knowledge of Koczalski's planned edition of Chopin's piano works would have been very important for the performance practice of Chopin's piano works.

=== Performer ===
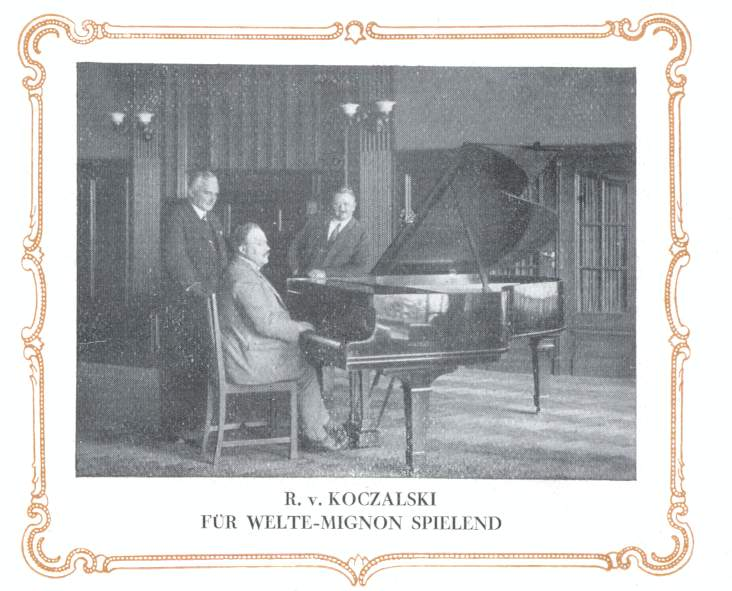
Raoul Koczalski recording for Welte-Mignon in 1925

Koczalski was highly esteemed as a performer of Chopin in Germany, where he lived during the 1920s and 1930s. During these years he also wrote many reviews, using his pseudonym, founded a music school that went bankrupt, and reestablished himself as a concert pianist by 1934. He toured in France, Italy and Poland, but (despite many invitations) not in the United States for reasons of health. During World War II he was again interned (in Berlin), and in 1945 he went to live in Poznań, accepting a post as professor in the State Higher School of Music.

As a performer, the complete works of Chopin and the complete Beethoven sonatas lay at the core of a very extensive repertoire from the classical and romantic genres. He was considered one of the greatest interpreters of Chopin's music and one of the greatest pianists of his time, with a very liquid technique, smooth balance and interpretations that did not take the liberties of many of his contemporaries, remaining closer to the written score. According to Seidle (2003), "(h)is playing avoids extremes, is clear, colourful, with flowing, subtle phrasing and broad dynamics". ("Sein Spiel meidet Extreme, ist klar, farbig, mit fließender, subtiler Phrasierung und breiter Dynamik.") His pupils included Detlef Kraus, Monique de La Bruchollerie, Hanna Rudnicka-Kruszewska, Wanda Losakiewicz and Irena Wyrzykowska-Mondelska.

Koczalski died in Poznań aged 64.

== Works (Selection) ==
=== Musical theatre ===
- Rymond. Opera in 3 Acts (6 tableaux). After a poem by Alexander Graf Fredro. Pabst, Leipzig 1902. (UA: 14. Oct. 1902 in Elberfeld)
- Mazeppa. Musical drama in 3 Acts, Op. 59. Leipzig, Pabst 1905
- Ante lucem (avant l'aube). Opéra en trois actes d'après le poème de A. Fredro (père). Janin, Lyon ca. 1905
- Die Sühne (Atonement). Tragedy in one act, Op. 61. Pabst, Leipzig 1910. (UA: 1909 in Mühlhausen)
- Jacqueline. Musikkomödie in 2 Acts, Op. 73 (1914)
- Mecz miłosny. Operette (1930)
- Semrud: a fairy tale from the Orient, in 5 tableaux and an overturel; (Text based on a fairy tale from A Thousand and One Nights, a dramatic sketch by Benno Ziegler and the comic opera Der betrogene Kadi by Ch. W. Gluck).,, Op. 118. Tischer & Jagenberg, Köln 1936.
- The Extinguished Light. Musical legend in 3 Acts, Op. 150 (1946)

=== Ballet ===
- Renata. Ballet in 3 Acts, Op. 81 (1915)

=== Orchestral ===
- Prelude to the opera Hagar, Op. 48 (1892)
- Symphonic Legend of King Boleslaus the Bold and Bishop Stanislaus the Saint for orchestra, Op. 53. Pabst, Leipzig 1894
- Évocations. Symphonie fantastique pour orchestre, Op. 78 (1915).
- Symphony for large orchestra in F minor, Op. 93 (1920-29)
- Semrud. Suite for large orchestra, Op. 118a (1937)

=== Concertante ===
- Concerto for Piano and Orchestra No. 1 in B minor, Op. 79
- Concerto for Piano and Orchestra No. 2 in G major, Op. 83 (1914)
- Concerto for Violin and Orchestra in A major, Op. 84 (1915)
- Concerto for Cello and Orchestra in B minor, Op. 85 (1915)
- Concerto for Piano and Orchestra No. 3 in C major, Op. 125
- Concerto for Piano and Orchestra No. 4 in B♭ major, Op. 130
- Concerto for Piano and Orchestra No. 5 in D minor, Op. 140 (1942)
- Concerto for Piano and Orchestra No. 6 in E major, Op. 145 (1944)
- Concertino for oboe (or violin) and string orchestra (?. published 1952)

=== Voice and Orchestra ===
- Of Love. Seven Poems by Rilke. Version for baritone and orchestra, Op. 99 (1921)

=== Chamber music ===
- Sonata for Violin and Piano No. 1 in C minor, Op. 74 (1914)
- Trio for Violin, Violoncello and Piano No. 1 in D major, Op. 76 (1914)
- Sonata for Violoncello and Piano No. 1 in B♭ minor, Op. 80
- Pieces for violin and piano, Op. 86-87 (1915)
- Trio for Violin, Violoncello and Piano No. 2 in G minor, Op. 88 (1916)
- Sonata for violin and piano in F♯ minor, Op. 89 (1915)
- Sonata for Violoncello and Piano No. 2 in A major, Op. 90
- Sonata for Piano No. 2 in F♯ minor, Op. 91 (1916)
- Sonata for Violoncello and Piano No. 3 in B major, Op. 92
- Sonata for Piano No. 3 in G major, Op. 95 (1919)
- Sonata for Violin and Piano No. 3 in A major, Op. 96
- Sonata for Piano No. 4 in G♯ minor, Op. 97
- Romantic Suite for Violoncello and Piano in B♭ major, Op. 98 (1921-25)
- Sonata for Violin and Piano No. 4 in E major, Op. 113 (c. 1937)

=== Voice & Piano ===
- Songs for High Voice and Piano, Op. 63 -, Op. 64
- 2 Songs for High Voice and Piano, Op. 72 (1914)
- Songbooks I-IV for high voice and piano, Op. 66 -, Op. 69. Pabst, Leipzig (1909-1913)
- Six mélodies for high voice and piano, Op. 77 (1914)
- 7 Oriental Songs for high voice and piano, Op. 94 (c. 1920)
- Of Love. Seven poems by Rilke. Version for low voice and piano, Op. 99 (1921)
- Songs for high and low voice with piano, Op. 101-107
- Extrême - Orient. 3 Poems by Samain for voice and piano, Op. 108
- 2 Romances (from the Russian) for high voice and piano, Op. 109* Quattro Liriche. 4 ital. Lieder für hohe Stimme und Klavier, Op. 110
- Aus Holland. 3 Poems by Ernst Krauss for high voices, Op. 112
- Rilke-Hefte II–V, Op. 114–117 for high voice and piano
- Trois Mélodies for High Voice and Piano, Op. 119
- Psalm No. 121 for low voice and piano, Op. 120
- From the West-Eastern Divan by Goethe. 21 Songs and Duets for Soprano and Baritone, Op. 121 (1937)
- 8 Hebbel-Lieder for low voice and piano, Op. 122
- Lurlei-Lieder. 5 Songs by Julius Wolff for High Voice and Piano, Op. 123
- 5 Songs for High Voice and Piano, Op. 126
- 3 Mirza Schaffy. Songs for High Voice and Piano, Op. 129
- Trois Poèmes de E. Verhaeren for High Voice and Piano, Op. 135
- Sonata for Piano No. 7 in E major, Op. 136
- 6 Songs (from the Russian) for High Voice and Piano, Op. 137
- 4 Songs for High Voice and Piano, Op. 138
- 8 Songs (from the Russian) for High Voice and Piano, Op. 141

=== Piano ===
- Mazurka for Piano in B♭ major, Op. 6 (1891)
- Raoul. Valse for Piano in G Major, Op. 18 (1889)
- Halina. Valse for Piano, Op. 19 (1890)
- Piano Pieces, Op. 40 -, Op. 47 (1891)
- Piano Pieces, Op. 49 -, Op. 52 (1893)
- Piano Pieces, Op. 54 -, Op. 57 (1895)
- Mazur for piano in C minor, Op. 60 (1895)
- Images fuyantes. 3 impressions musicales for piano, Op. 62
- 24 Préludes pour le piano, Op. 65 (1910)
- Piano Pieces, Op. 70 -, Op. 71 (1912)
- 12 Impressions for piano, Op. 75 (1914)
- Sonata for Piano No. 1 in E♭ major, Op. 82 (1914)
- Sonata for Piano No. 5 in D♭ major, Op. 100
- La Gavotta dei Bambini for piano in B♭ major, Op. 111 (1920)
- Impromptu. 5 sketches on an own theme for piano A major, Op. 124 (1938)
- Legend for Piano No. 1 in C major, Op. 127. Koczalski, Berlin-Grunewald (ca. 1940)
- Jadis et Naguère. Suite for piano, Op. 131 (1935-40).
- Śmiełów. Suite for piano, Op. 132 (1938-41).
- Czerminek. Suite for Piano, Op. 133 (1938-41).
- Sonata for Piano No. 6 in F minor, Op. 134
- Lyrical Suite for Piano, Op. 139
- Romance for Violin and Piano in A Major, Op. 142
- Sonata for Piano No. 8 in F♯ Major, Op. 143 (1943)
- Legend for Piano No. 2 in E minor, Op. 144 (1943-45)
- Little Sonata for Piano for 2 Hands in C major, Op. 146. Koczalski, Berlin-Grunewald (ca. 1942)
- 3 Nocturnes for piano, Op. 147. Koczalski, Berlin-Grunewald (ca. 1942)
- Legend for Piano No. 3 in G minor, Op. 148 (1944)
- Legend for Piano No. 4 in D minor, Op. 149 (1945)

Source: This list, originally available on the German Wikipedia page dedicated to Koczalski, was compiled with the used of the catalogue of the Staatsbibliothek zu Berlin, and after Stanisław Dybowski: Wykaz kompozycji Raula Koczalskiego, in: Teresa Brodniewicz u. a.: Raul Koczalski. Akademia Muzyczna im. I. J. Paderewskiego w Poznaniu, Poznań 2001.

== Writings ==
In addition to his books, Koczalski wrote several press articles.

- Raoul Koczalski: Zum hundertsten Geburtstag Frédéric Chopins: Chopin-Zyklus; vier Klaviervorträge nebst einer biographischen Skizze: F. Chopin, sowie den Aufsätzen: Chopin als Komponist und Chopin als Pianist, und einer eingehenden Analyse aller zum Vortrag bestimmten Werke (Leipzig: Pabst, 1909).
- Raoul Koczalski: Frédéric Chopin: Betrachtungen, Skizzen, Analysen (Cologne: Tischer & Jagenberg, 1936).
- Raoul Koczalski: Betrachtungen eines "lebenslänglichen" Künstlers (Berlin, 1937).

== Discography of Koczalski as pianist ==
- 1948 - Frederic Chopin - Nocturne in B major, op. 32 no. 1. K 57887 "MEWA records".
- 1948 - Frédéric Chopin - Nocturne in E-flat major, op. 9 no. 2. K 57886 "MEWA records".
- 1948 - Frédéric Chopin - Waltz in C sharp minor, op. 64 no. 2, Prelude in A major, op. 27 no. 7. K 51593 "MEWA records"
- 1948 - Frédéric Chopin - Barceuse in D flat major, op. 57 "lullaby" K 51592 "MEWA records".

== Discography ==
- 2017 – Chamber Works vol. 1 – Acte Préalable AP0383.
- 2020 – Chamber Works vol. 2 – Acte Préalable AP0476.
- 2022 – Chamber Works vol. 3 – Acte Préalable AP0510.
- 2022 – Chamber Works vol. 4 – Acte Préalable AP0520.
- 2017 – Piano Concertos vol. 1 – Acte Préalable AP0501.
- 2018 – Piano Concertos vol. 2 – Acte Préalable AP0502.
- 2019 – Piano Concertos vol. 3 – Acte Préalable AP0503.
- 2018 – String Concertos – Acte Préalable AP0504.
- 2023 - Symphonic Works vol. 1 - Raul Koczalski (1885-1948), Symphonic Works vol. 1
- 2019 – Complete Songs vol. 1 – Acte Préalable AP0601.
- 2021 – Songs to the poetry of Kazimierz Przerwa-Tetmajer – Acte Préalable AP0522.

== Encounter with Naser al-Din Shah of Persia ==
During his third tour of Europe in 1889, Naser al-Din Shah Qajar of Persia met the young Koczalski in Belgium. The Shah, a keen diarist, recorded the encounter, expressing his astonishment at the child prodigy's talent. In his travelogue, he wrote of the seven-year-old pianist:

After lunch, they mentioned a small boy from Warsaw who plays the piano well; he had been at the Paris Exposition. He came into our presence, he was about seven years old. Very mischievous and sharp, but he played the piano so beautifully, it was an extraordinary thing. His mother said he is devoted to the piano; he plays continuously until bedtime. We also gave him a medal, which made him happy, and he asked for permission to call himself our pianist. We gave him permission. His name was Raoul Kouzalski.

The original Persian text from the Shah's diary reads:

بعد از نهار یک پسر کوچکی از اهل ورشو گفتند پیانو خوب می‌زند، در اکسپوزیسیون پاریس بوده است، به حضور ما آمد، قریب هفت سال داشت، خیلی بدذات و زرنگ اما خیلی قشنگ پیانو می‌زد، چیز غریبی بود. مادرش می‌گفت واله پیانو است، تا وقت خوابیدن متصل می‌زند. ما هم یک مدال به او دادیم، خوشحال شد و اجازه خواست که خود را پیانوزنِ ما بنامد، اجازه دادیم. اسمش Raoul Kouzalski بود.

== Sources ==
- Bernhard Vogel: Raoul Koczalski. Skizze (Leipzig: Pabst, 1896).
- Marja Paruszewska: Szkic biograficzny i artystyczna karjera Raula Koczalskiego (Poznań, 1936).
- Stanisław Dybowski: Raul Koczalski. Chopinista i kompozytor (Warszawa: Selene, 1998), ISBN 83-910515-0-1.
- Stanisław Dybowski: Słownik pianistów polskich (Warszawa: Selene, 2003).
- Teresa Brodniewicz, H.Kostrzewskiej, J. Tatarskiej: Raul Koczalski (Poznań: Akademia Muzyczna im. Ignacego Jana Paderewskiego w Poznaniu, 2001), ISBN 83-88392-25-5.
- Mała encyklopedia muzyki, praca zbiorowa (Warszawa: PWN, 1981).
- Mała Encyklopedia muzyki, pod red. Józefa Władysława Reissa (Warszawa: PWN, 1960).
