= Stanislav Lyudkevych =

Soviet Ukrainian composer (1879–1979)

People's Artist (USSR, Ukrainian SSR) Stanislav Lyudkevych
- Станіслав Людкевич
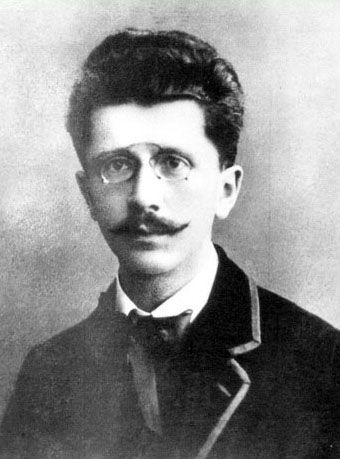
- Lyudkevych in the 1920s
- Born: 24 January 1879; Jarosław, Kingdom of Galicia and Lodomeria, Austria-Hungary
- Died: 10 September 1979 (aged 100); Lviv, Ukrainian SSR, Soviet Union
- Occupations: Composer; music theorist; teacher

Stanislav Pylypovych Lyudkevych (Ukrainian: Станіслав Пилипович Людкевич, Polish: Stanisław Ludkiewicz, Russian: Станислав Филиппович Людкевич, romanized: Stanislav Filippovich Lyudkevich; 24 January 1879 – 10 September 1979) was a Ukrainian and Soviet composer, theorist, teacher and musical activist. He was a People's Artist of the USSR (1969) and Hero of Socialist Labour (1979).

== Biography ==
Lyudkevych was born in 1879 in Jarosław, Austria-Hungary (now Poland). Before going to university he initially learned music theory privately from his mother, who was a pianist. He is a former student of the Lviv Academic Gymnasium. From 1897 to 1901 Lyudkevych studied philosophy at Lviv University. During this time he also studied on his own at the Conservatory of Galician Music Society in Lviv under Mieczysław Sołtys. Starting in 1901, Lyudkevych worked as a teacher in Lviv and Przemyśl. He earned a Doctor of Philosophy in musicology in Vienna in 1908, learning from O. Tsemlinsky and H. Hredener.

From 1905 to 1907, Lyudkevych was an editor of the magazine Artistic Bulletin. He was one of the organizers of the higher musical institute in Lviv named after Mykola Lysenko, from 1910 until 1915 he was its director, and from 1919, teacher of theoretical disciplines and inspector of legal entities. He worked with the choirs Boyan, Bandurist, Surma. In 1936, Lyudkevych became head of the musicological commission of the Shevchenko Scientific Society. From 1939 until 1972, he was a professor in the institute named after Mykola Lysenko.

He died on September 10, 1979, in Lviv, aged 100.

== Works ==
- Opera – Dovbush (1955)
- Monumental cantatas including the symphony-cantatas Caucasus (1905–13) and Zapovit (Will, 1934, 2nd edition 1955) based on words by Taras Shevchenko both for which he won the Republican Prize in the name of Taras Shevchenko in 1964
- Symphonic works – symphonic poems, sinfoniettas, chamber and other instrumental pieces
- Choral works
- Romances
- Songs
- He systematized folk songs

He was the author of numerous musicological works, was a publicist, and originator and editor of musical publications.

== Style ==
The participation of Lyudkevych in the revolutionary-democratic movement of Western Ukraine lead to the ideological orientation of his activities and works.

== Honors ==
- 1946 – Honored Art Worker of the Ukrainian SSR
- 1949 – Order of the Red Banner of Labour
- 1951 – Order of the Badge of Honour
- 1954 – People's Artist of the Ukrainian SSR
- 1964 – Shevchenko National Prize for his Symphony-Canata "Caucasus" and his vocal-symphonic cantata "Zapovit" based on words by Taras Shevchenko
- 1969 – People's Artist of the USSR
- 1974 – Order of Friendship of Peoples
- 1979 – Order of Lenin
- 1979 – Hero of Socialist Labour
- Featured on a Ukrainian stamp.
- Lviv Art College is named after S. Ludkevych as well as streets in Lviv, Stryi, Pustomyty and also Jarosław (Poland), where Lyudkevych was born.

== See also ==
- List of Ukrainian composers
- List of centenarians (musicians, composers and music patrons)
