= Karol Mikuli =

Polish pianist, composer and conductor (1821–1897)

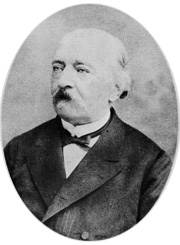
- Portrait of Karol Mikuli

Background information
- Born: 22 October 1821; Czernowitz, Kingdom of Galicia and Lodomeria, Austrian Empire
- Origin: Armenian, Romanian
- Died: 21 May 1897 (aged 77) Lemberg, Kingdom of Galicia and Lodomeria, Austria-Hungary
- Occupations: pianist, composer, conductor and teacher

Karol Mikuli, also known as Charles Mikuli (Armenian: Կարոլ Միկուլի or Կարոլ Պստիկյան; 22 October 1821 – 21 May 1897), was a Polish pianist, composer, conductor and teacher. His students included Moriz Rosenthal, Raoul Koczalski, Aleksander Michałowski, Ciprian Porumbescu, Jaroslaw Zieliński, Kornelia Parnas and Heinrich Schenker.

== Biographical notes ==
Mikuli (birth surname Bsdikian) was born on October 22, 1821, in Czernowitz, then part of the Austrian Empire (today Chernivtsi, Ukraine) to a Romanianized Moldavian-Armenian family. He studied under Frédéric Chopin for piano (later becoming his teaching assistant) and Anton Reicha for composition. He toured widely as a concert pianist, becoming Director of the Lviv Conservatory in 1858. He founded his own school there in 1888. He died in Lemberg, then part of Austrian Galicia (today Lviv, Ukraine) and is buried in Lychakiv Cemetery in Lviv.

== Editions ==
Mikuli is most well known as an editor of works by Chopin. Dover Publications publishes reprints of his 1879 editions of Chopin's piano music, originally published by F. Kistner (Leipzig). He used several verified sources, most of which were written or corrected by Chopin himself. His editions of Chopin's works were first published in America in 1895.

Mikuli also took detailed notes of Chopin's comments made in lessons and interviewed witnesses of Chopin's performances. For many years he was regarded as the primary authority on Chopin and his remarks about Chopin's playing were often quoted by biographers.

== Compositions ==
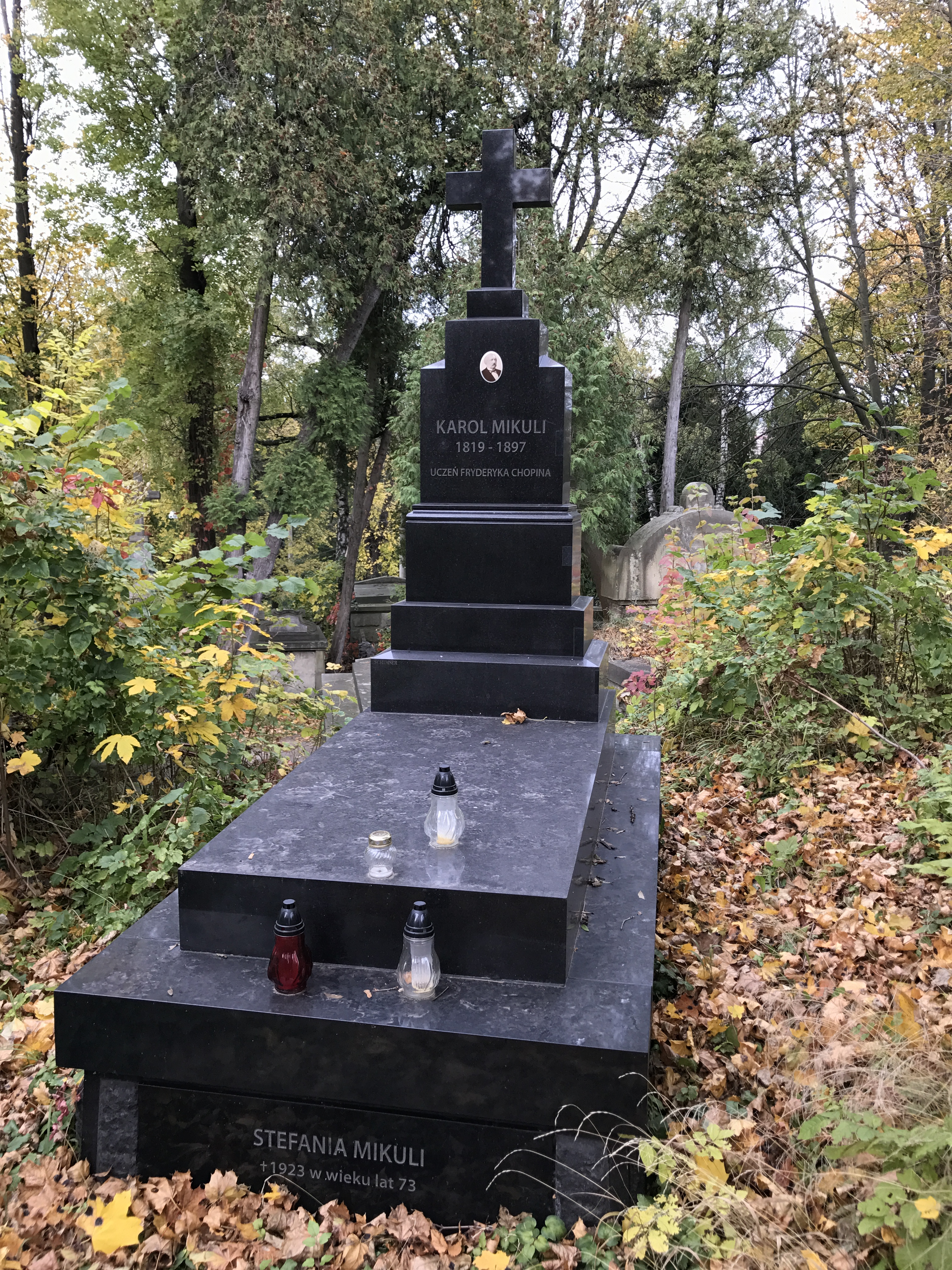
Mikuli's grave in Lychakiv cemetery, Lviv, Ukraine.

Orchestral

- 48 Airs nationaux roumains for orchestra, also arr. piano.

Chamber music

- Polonaise for 3 violins, Op. 7 (published 1862)
- Serenade in A♭ major for clarinet and piano, Op. 22 (1880) (Romanian: Serenadă pentru clarinet și pian, Op. 22)
- Scherzino in C minor for 3 violins, Op. 25 (1880)
- Grand duo in A major for violin and piano, Op. 26

Piano

- Prélude et presto agitato, Op. 1 (published 1859)
- 4 Mazurkas, Op. 2 (1860)
- Mazurka in F minor, Op. 4 (1860)
- 2 Polonaises, Op. 8 (1862)
- 48 Airs nationaux roumains (Ballades, chants des bergers, airs de danse, etc.) in 4 volumes (1863)
- 6 Pièces, Op. 9 (published 1866 by Spina in Vienna)
- Mazurka, Op. 10 (1866)
- Mazurka in B minor, Op. 11 (1866)
- Étude in B major for piano with harmonium, Op. 12 (1867)
- 6 Danses allemandes, Op. 13 (1867)
- Méditation, Op. 14 (1867)
- Andante con Variazioni for piano 4-hands, Op. 15 (1867)
- 6 Valses, Op. 18 (1869)
- 2 Nocturnes, Op. 19 (1869)
- Valse in A major, Op. 20 (1869)
- Ballade in B♭ major, Op. 21 (1871)
- 12 Variantes (Variations) harmoniques sur la gamme d'Ut majeure for piano 4-hands, Op. 23 (1880); published by Kistner (Leipzig)
- 10 Pièces, Op. 24 (1880)

Vocal

- 6 Lieder for voice and piano, Op. 16 (1867)
- 6 Lieder for voice and piano, Op. 17 (1867)
- 7 Lieder for voice and piano, Op. 27 (1880)
- 2 Duette for soprano, tenor and piano, Op. 28 (1880)
- Die Reue: „Die Nacht war schwarz“ for baritone and string orchestra, Op. 30 (1880)

Choral

- 7 Lieder for soprano, alto, tenor and bass, Op. 17 (1880)
- Paraphrase sur un ancien Chant de Noël polonais for 4 voices (solo and chorus), strings and organ (or piano 4-hands), Op. 31 (1881)
- 2 Spiritual Songs for male chorus and soli, Op. 32
- Veni creator for mixed chorus and organ, Op. 33

== Recordings ==
- Şahan Arzruni: An Anthology of Armenian Piano Music, Vol I, Musical Heritage Society - MHS 4080.
